= Douglas S. Coppinger =

U.S. Air Force general

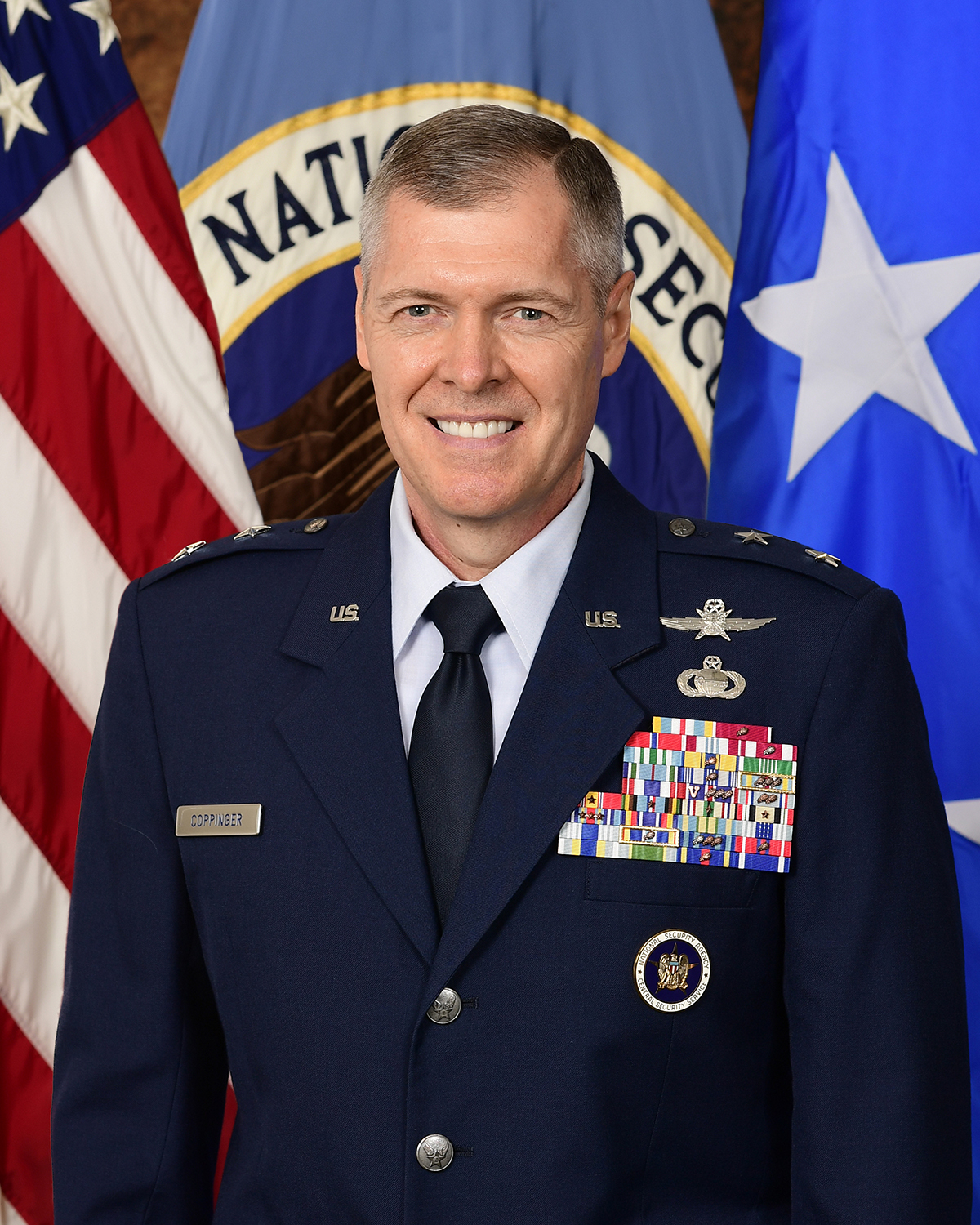
- Military career
- Allegiance: United States
- Branch: United States Air Force
- Service years: 1983–2023
- Rank: Major General
- Commands: 91st Cyberspace Operations Squadron; 313th Training Squadron
- Awards: Defense Superior Service Medal (3); Legion of Merit (2)

Douglas S. Coppinger is a retired United States Air Force major general who served as the deputy chief of the Central Security Service. Prior to that, he was the director for intelligence of the U.S. Cyber Command.

Military offices
Preceded by Timothy D. Haugh	Director for Intelligence of the United States Cyber Command; 2018–2020	Succeeded by Matteo Martemucci
Preceded by Daniel J. MacDonnell	Deputy Chief of the Central Security Service; 2020–2023	Succeeded by Matteo Martemucci
