= Paul Nakasone =

United States Army general (retired)

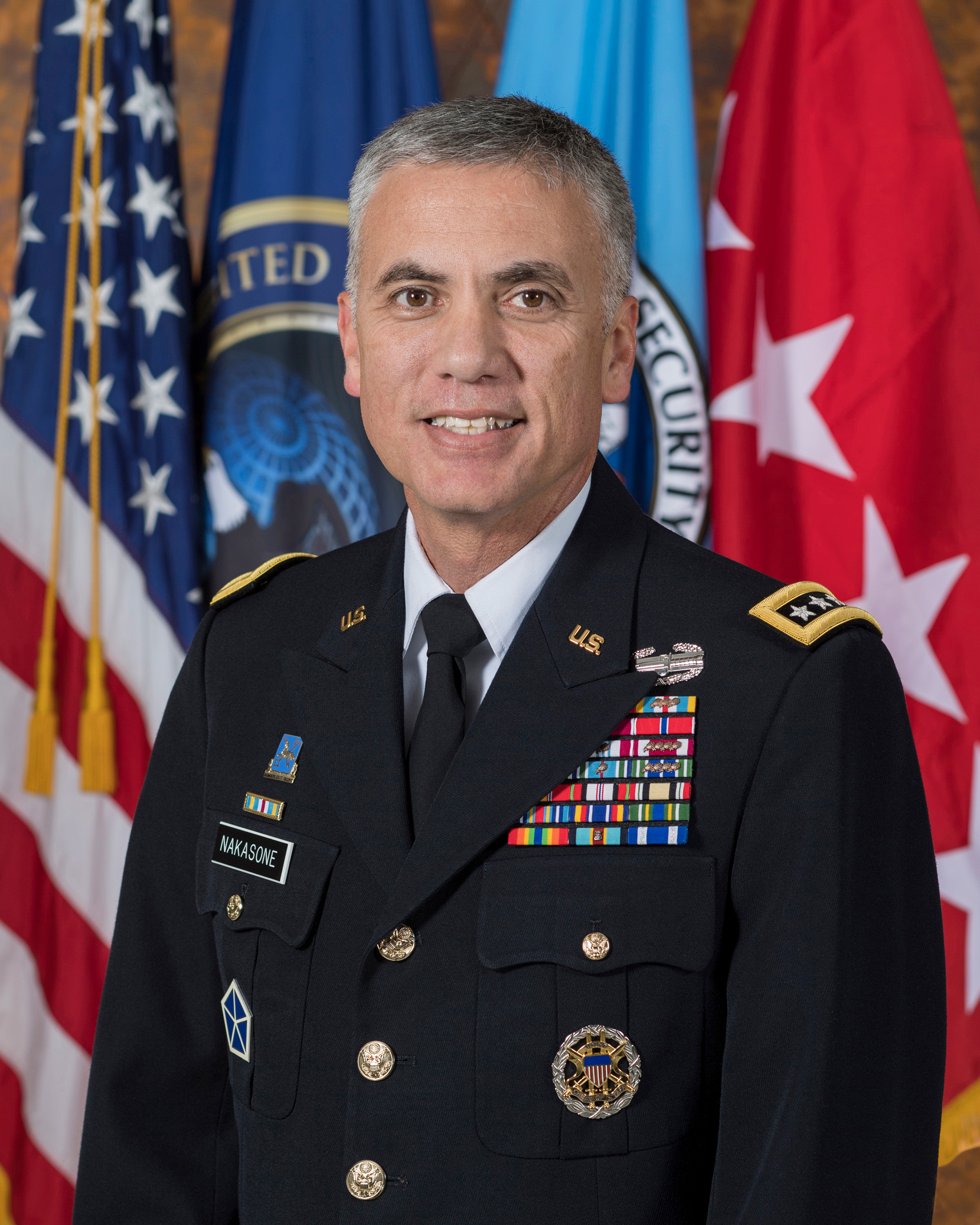

3rd Commander of United States Cyber Command
- In office 4 May 2018 – 2 February 2024
- President: Donald Trump; Joe Biden
- Preceded by: Michael S. Rogers
- Succeeded by: Timothy D. Haugh

18th Director of the National Security Agency
- In office 4 May 2018 – 2 February 2024
- President: Donald Trump; Joe Biden
- Deputy: George Barnes; Wendy Noble
- Preceded by: Michael S. Rogers
- Succeeded by: Timothy D. Haugh

Personal details
- Born: Paul Miki Nakasone; 19 November 1963 (age 62) White Bear Lake, Minnesota, U.S.
- Spouse: Susan Nakasone
- Children: 4
- Education: Saint John's University (BA); University of Southern California (MA); National Intelligence University (MA); United States Army War College (MA)

Military service
- Allegiance: United States
- Branch/service: United States Army
- Years of service: 1986–2024
- Rank: General
- Commands: United States Army Cyber Command; Second United States Army; Director of Intelligence, J2; International Security Assistance Force
- Battles/wars: War in Afghanistan; Iraq War
- Awards: Defense Distinguished Service Medal; Army Distinguished Service Medal (2); Defense Superior Service Medal (4); Legion of Merit; Bronze Star; George Washington Spymaster Award
- Paul M. Nakasone's voice Nakasone's opening statement at his confirmation hearing to be director of the National Security Agency; Recorded 15 March 2018

Paul Miki Nakasone (Japanese: 仲宗根 幹, born 19 November 1963) is a retired four-star general in the United States Army who served as the commander of United States Cyber Command. He concurrently served as the director of the National Security Agency and as chief of the Central Security Service. Nakasone took command of the United States Second Army and Army Cyber Command in October 2016, until the Second Army's inactivation in March 2017. In May 2018, he became head of the National Security Agency, the Central Security Service, and the United States Cyber Command.

He is on the board of directors of WitnessAI and OpenAI.

== Early life and education ==
Born in White Bear Lake, Minnesota. He is the son of Edwin M. Nakasone, a second-generation Japanese American and a retired United States Army colonel who served in the Military Intelligence Service during World War II, and Mary Anne Nakasone (née Costello). His paternal grandparents came from Misato village in the Nakagami District, Okinawa.

Nakasone grew up in White Bear Lake, Minnesota, and attended White Bear High School. He is married to Susan S. (née Sternberg), and has four (4) children. Nakasone attended St. John's University, where he received a commission as military intelligence officer in 1986 through the Army Reserve Officers' Training Corps program. Nakasone also attended the University of Southern California earning a M.S. in Systems Management, the National Defense Intelligence College, and the United States Army War College, earning master's degrees from those institutions as well. He also is a graduate of the United States Army Command and General Staff College.

== Military career ==
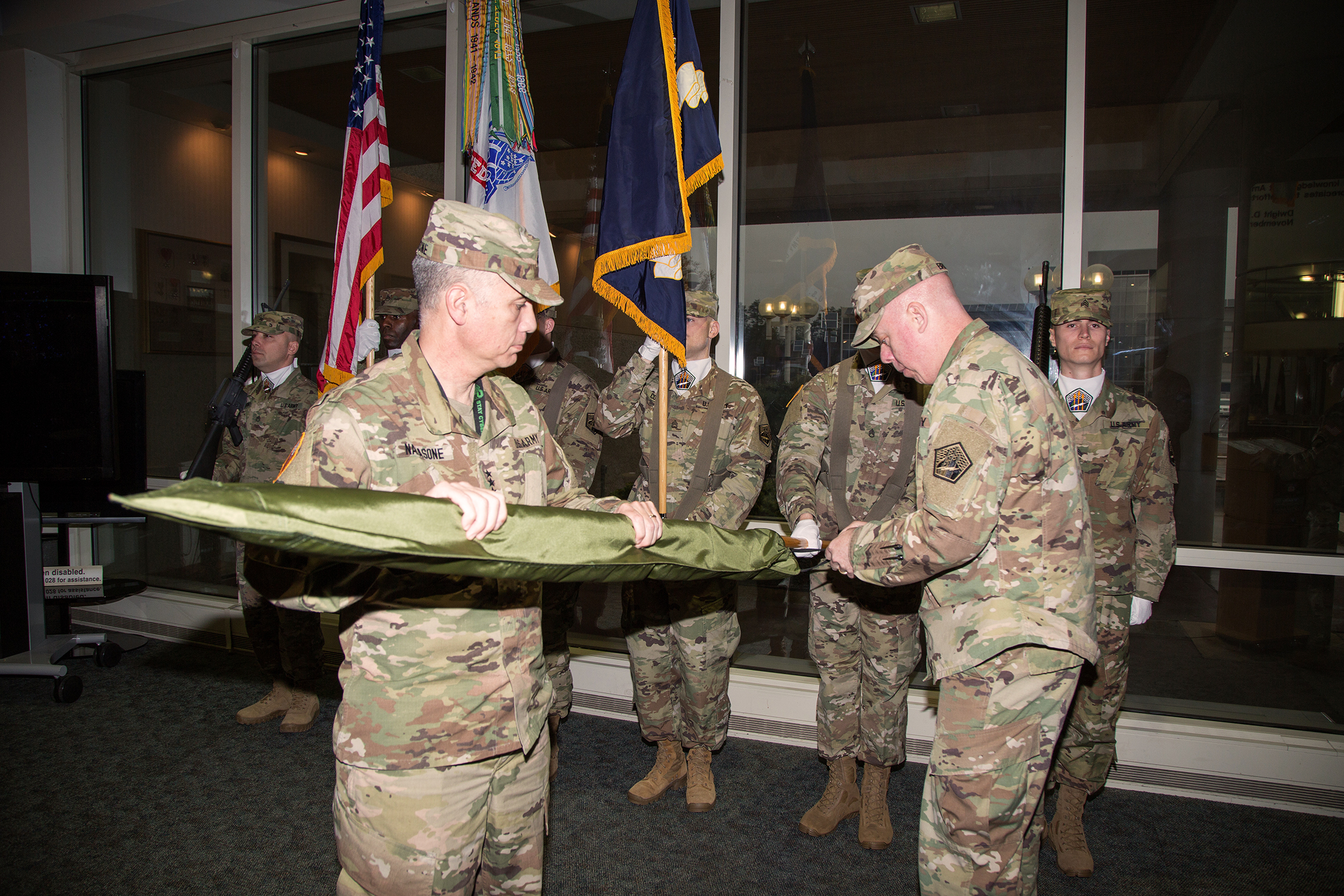
Nakasone casing the Second Army's colors in 2017 at its inactivation ceremony

Nakasone has commanded at the company, battalion, and brigade levels. He also served in foreign assignments in Iraq, Afghanistan and Korea, and has served as a senior intelligence officer at the battalion, division, and corps levels. Nakasone served on the Joint Chiefs of Staff as deputy director for trans-regional policy in 2012 when he was promoted to the rank of brigadier general and previously served as a staff officer for General Keith B. Alexander.

Prior to promotion to lieutenant general in 2016, Nakasone was the deputy commanding general of United States Army Cyber Command and later commander of the Cyber National Mission Force at Cyber Command. Nakasone has twice served as a staff officer for the Joint Chiefs of Staff and was the director of intelligence, J2, for the International Security Assistance Force in Afghanistan. On 14 October 2016, he took command of the United States Second Army and United States Army Cyber Command. Nakasone was also given control of United States Cyber Command's Joint Task Force-ARES, a task-force designed to coordinate electronic counter-terrorist activities against the Islamic State. He served as commander of the Second Army until it was inactivated for the fourth time in its history on 31 March 2017, and continued to serve as commander of United States Army Cyber Command.

In January 2018, it was reported that Nakasone was on the list of potential replacements for outgoing NSA Director Michael S. Rogers. In February 2018, he was nominated for promotion to general. In April 2018, Nakasone was unanimously confirmed by the United States Senate as director of the National Security Agency and head of the United States Cyber Command. He was also promoted to the rank of general. In May 2022, Nakasone was asked to remain as the head of U.S. Cyber Command and the National Security Agency until 2023. In those roles, he has attracted attention for disclosing that the U.S. government took unspecified cyber offensive action against ransomware gangs operating outside the United States that targeted American infrastructure, as well as against Russian targets associated with the invasion of Ukraine.

== Retirement and later life ==
Nakasone retired from the military on 1 February 2024. General Timothy D. Haugh succeeded him as Director of the NSA and head of Cyber Command.

On 14 February 2024, Nakasone published an opinion article in the Washington Post, arguing for Congress to re-approve the Foreign Intelligence Surveillance Act, which was due to expire in spring 2024. Congress reauthorized the bill on 20 April, hours before it would have expired.

In May 2024, Nakasone was named Founding Director of Vanderbilt University's new Institute of National Security. Nakasone will also hold a Research Professorship within Vanderbilt's School of Engineering, as well as serving as special advisor to the chancellor. Also in May 2024, Nakasone was elected to the board of trustees of Saint John's University, his alma mater. Nakasone was awarded an honorary Doctor of Laws degree from Dartmouth College on 9 June 2024.

Nakasone joined the board of OpenAI in June 2024.

In June 2025, Nakasone spoke at the WORLD.MINDS meeting in Washington DC about China, AI and the transatlantic relationship.

== Awards and decorations ==
Left Side

Badge	Combat Action Badge		
1st row	Defense Distinguished Service Medal		
2nd row	Army Distinguished Service Medal with oak leaf cluster	Defense Superior Service Medal with three oak leaf clusters	Legion of Merit
3rd row	Bronze Star Medal	Defense Meritorious Service Medal with oak leaf cluster	Meritorious Service Medal with four oak leaf clusters
4th row	Army Commendation Medal	Joint Service Achievement Medal with oak leaf cluster	Army Achievement Medal with four oak leaf clusters
5th row	National Defense Service Medal with service star	Afghanistan Campaign Medal	Iraq Campaign Medal
6th row	Global War on Terrorism Expeditionary; Medal	Global War on Terrorism Service Medal	Korea Defense Service Medal
7th row	Army Service Ribbon	Army Overseas Service Ribbon with award numeral 5	NATO Medal for service with ISAF
8th row	Order of the Rising Sun with grand cordon	Legion of Honour; Officer	
Badge	Joint Chiefs of Staff Identification Badge		

Right Side

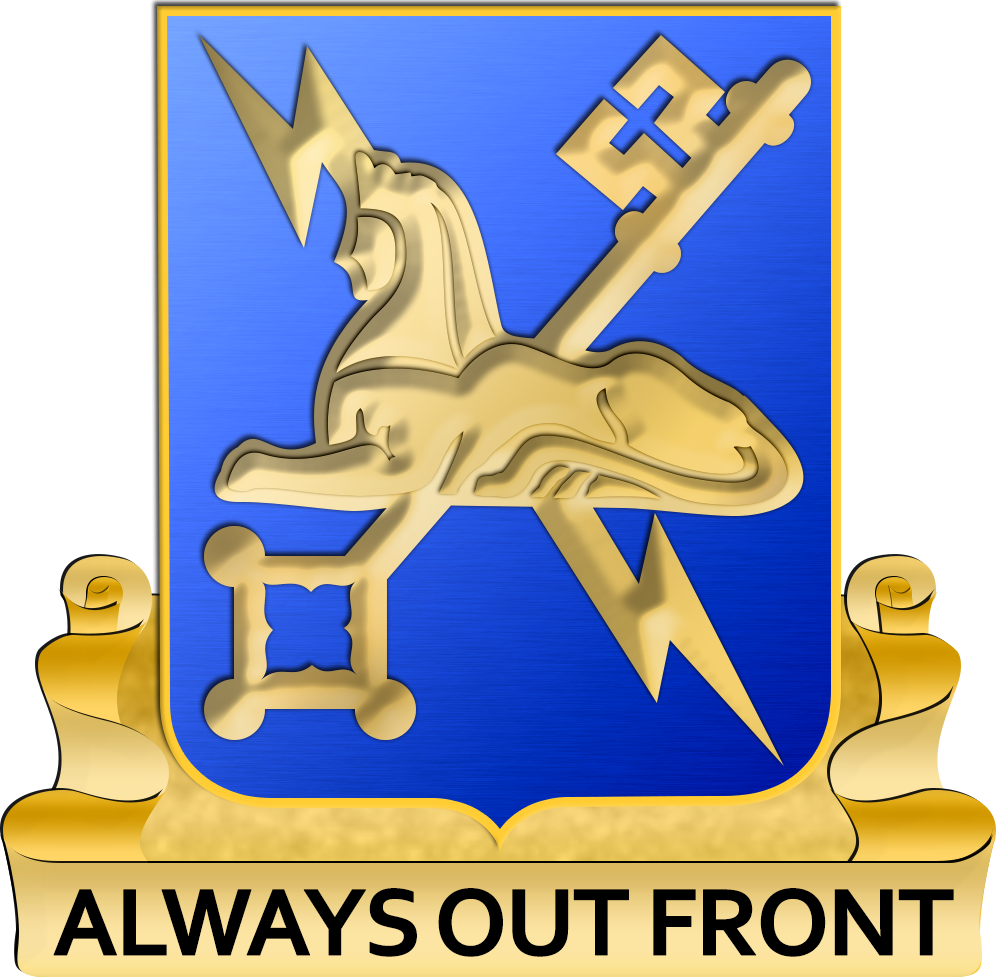

Army Military Intelligence Corps Distinctive Unit Insignia
Joint Meritorious Unit Award
V Corps Combat Service Identification Badge

Other awards

Overseas Service Bar (x4)

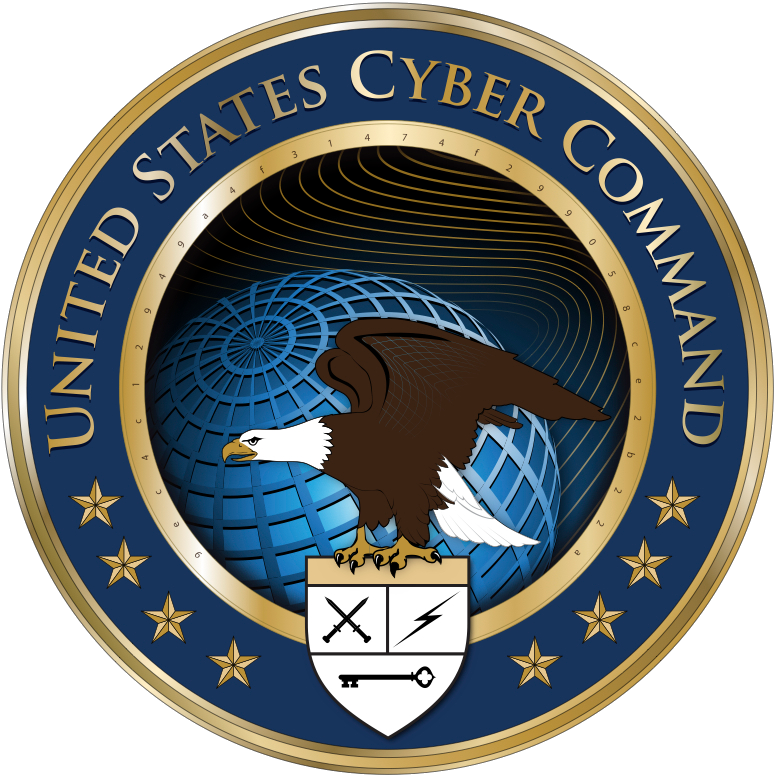
National Security Agency Badge
United States Cyber Command Badge

Military offices
New unit	Commander of the Cyber National Mission Force; 2014–2016	Succeeded by Timothy J. White
Preceded by Edward C. Cardon	Commanding General of the Second United States Army; 2016–2017	Position abolished
Preceded by Edward C. Cardon	Commanding General of the United States Army Cyber Command; 2016–2018	Succeeded by Stephen G. Fogarty
Preceded by Michael S. Rogers	Commander of the United States Cyber Command, Director of the National Security Agency, and Chief of the Central Security Service; 2018–2024	Succeeded by Timothy D. Haugh
