= Timothy D. Haugh =

U.S. Air Force general

Timothy Haugh
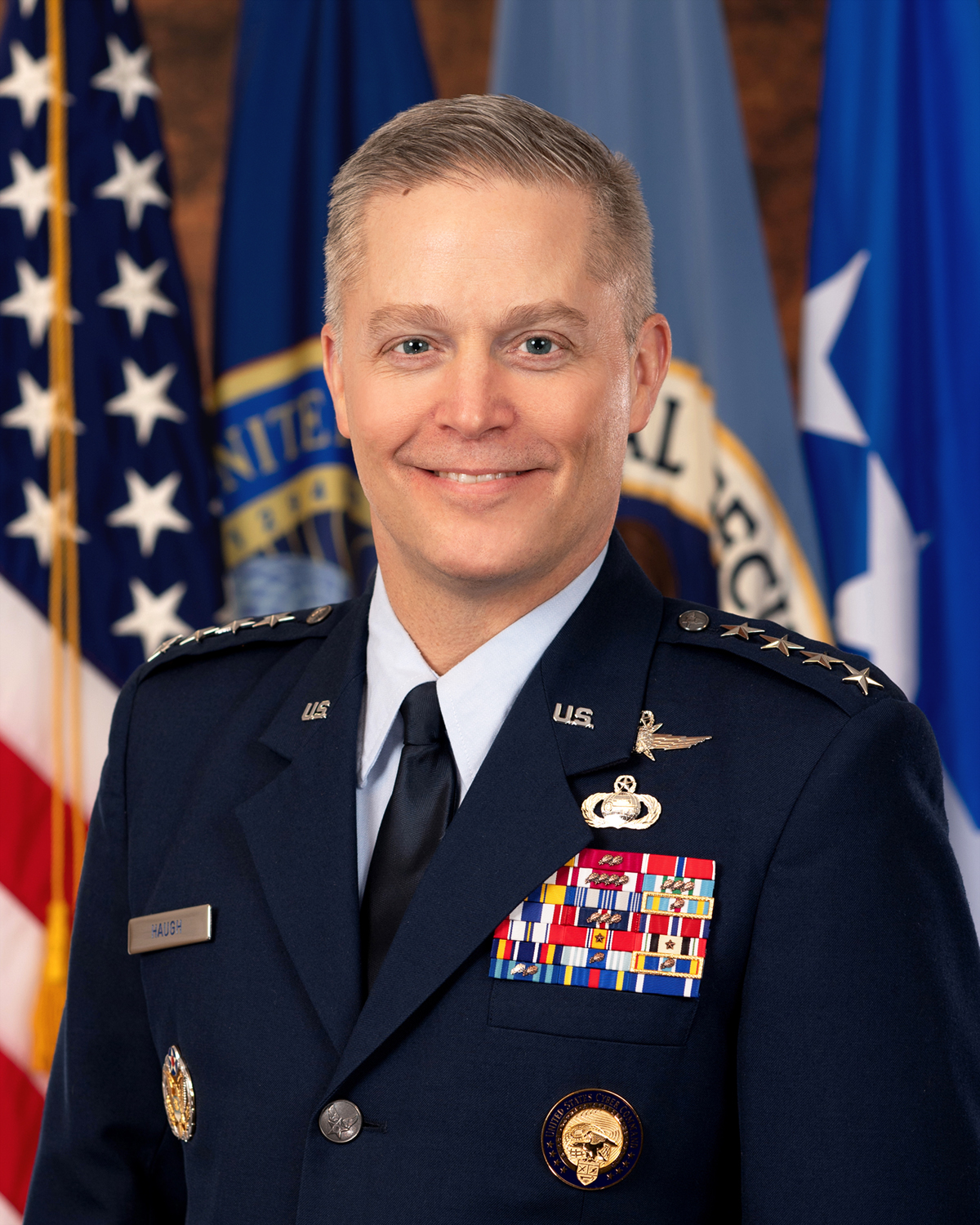

4th Commander of United States Cyber Command
- In office 2 February 2024 – 3 April 2025
- President: Donald Trump
- Preceded by: Paul Nakasone
- Succeeded by: Joshua Rudd

19th Director of the National Security Agency
- In office 2 February 2024 – 3 April 2025
- President: Donald Trump
- Deputy: Wendy Noble
- Preceded by: Paul Nakasone
- Succeeded by: Joshua Rudd

Personal details
- Born: Timothy Dean Haugh; 11 January 1969 (age 57)
- Education: Lehigh University (BA); Southern Methodist University (MS); Naval Postgraduate School (MS); National Defense University (MS)
- Awards: Defense Superior Service Medal; Legion of Merit (3); Bronze Star

Military service
- Allegiance: United States
- Branch: United States Air Force
- Years of service: 1991–2025
- Rank: General
- Commands: United States Cyber Command; National Security Agency; Central Security Service; Sixteenth Air Force; Twenty-Fifth Air Force; Cyber National Mission Force; 480th Intelligence, Surveillance and Reconnaissance Wing; 318th Information Operations Group; 315th Network Warfare Squadron
- Battles/wars: Iraq War
- Timothy D. Haugh's voice Haugh's opening statement at his confirmation hearing to be director of the National Security Agency; Recorded 12 July 2023

Timothy Dean Haugh (born 11 January 1969) is a retired United States Air Force general who served as the commander of the United States Cyber Command, director of the National Security Agency, and chief of the Central Security Service from 2024 to 2025. He previously served as the deputy commander of the United States Cyber Command.

== Biography ==
Born in 1969, Haugh is from Hughesville, Pennsylvania, and graduated from high school there in 1987. He was commissioned through AFROTC at Lehigh University. His father was an enlisted navigator in the United States Marine Corps. In May 2023, Haugh was nominated for promotion to general and appointment as commander of the United States Cyber Command, director of the National Security Agency, and chief of the Central Security Service. On 30 November, Sen. Ron Wyden pledged to block the vote confirming Haugh as director of the NSA and U.S. Cyber Command until the NSA releases information on the alleged purchase and use of data collected on American citizens. The U.S. Senate approved the nomination and his promotion to the rank of general on 19 December.

On 3 April 2025, Haugh was relieved of his positions. Julian Barnes in The New York Times reported the Department of Defense did not respond to requests for commentary and also wrote, based on an alleged anonymous source within the Trump administration, that Laura Loomer met with president Donald Trump the day prior and called for Haugh to be fired due to perceived "disloyalty" to the current president of the United States. Trump subsequently directed Secretary of Defense Pete Hegseth to dismiss Haugh.

== Effective dates of promotions ==
Rank	Date
Second Lieutenant	9 December 1991
First Lieutenant	9 December 1993
Captain	9 December 1995
Major	1 September 2002
Lieutenant Colonel	1 March 2006
Colonel	1 August 2011
Brigadier General	2 November 2016
Major General	30 August 2019
Lieutenant General	11 October 2019
General	2 February 2024

Military offices
Preceded by Jeffrey A. Kruse	Commander of the 480th Intelligence, Surveillance and Reconnaissance Wing; 2014–2016	Succeeded by Jason M. Brown
Preceded by Edward C. Cardon	Deputy Commander of Joint Task Force – Ares; 2016–2017	Succeeded by Jennifer G. Buckner
Preceded by Mary F. O'Brien	Director for Intelligence of the United States Cyber Command; 2017–2018	Succeeded by Douglas S. Coppinger
Preceded by Timothy J. White	Commander of the Cyber National Mission Force; 2018–2019	Succeeded by William J. Hartman
Preceded by Mary F. O'Brien	Commander of the Twenty-Fifth Air Force; 2019	Command inactivated
New office	Commander of the Sixteenth Air Force; 2019–2022	Succeeded by Kevin B. Kennedy Jr.
Preceded by Charles L. Moore	Deputy Commander of the United States Cyber Command; 2022–2024	Succeeded by William J. Hartman
Preceded by Paul M. Nakasone	Commander of the United States Cyber Command, Director of the National Security Agency, and Chief of the Central Security Service; 2024–2025	Succeeded by William J. Hartman
