= Leadership of the United States Pacific Command =

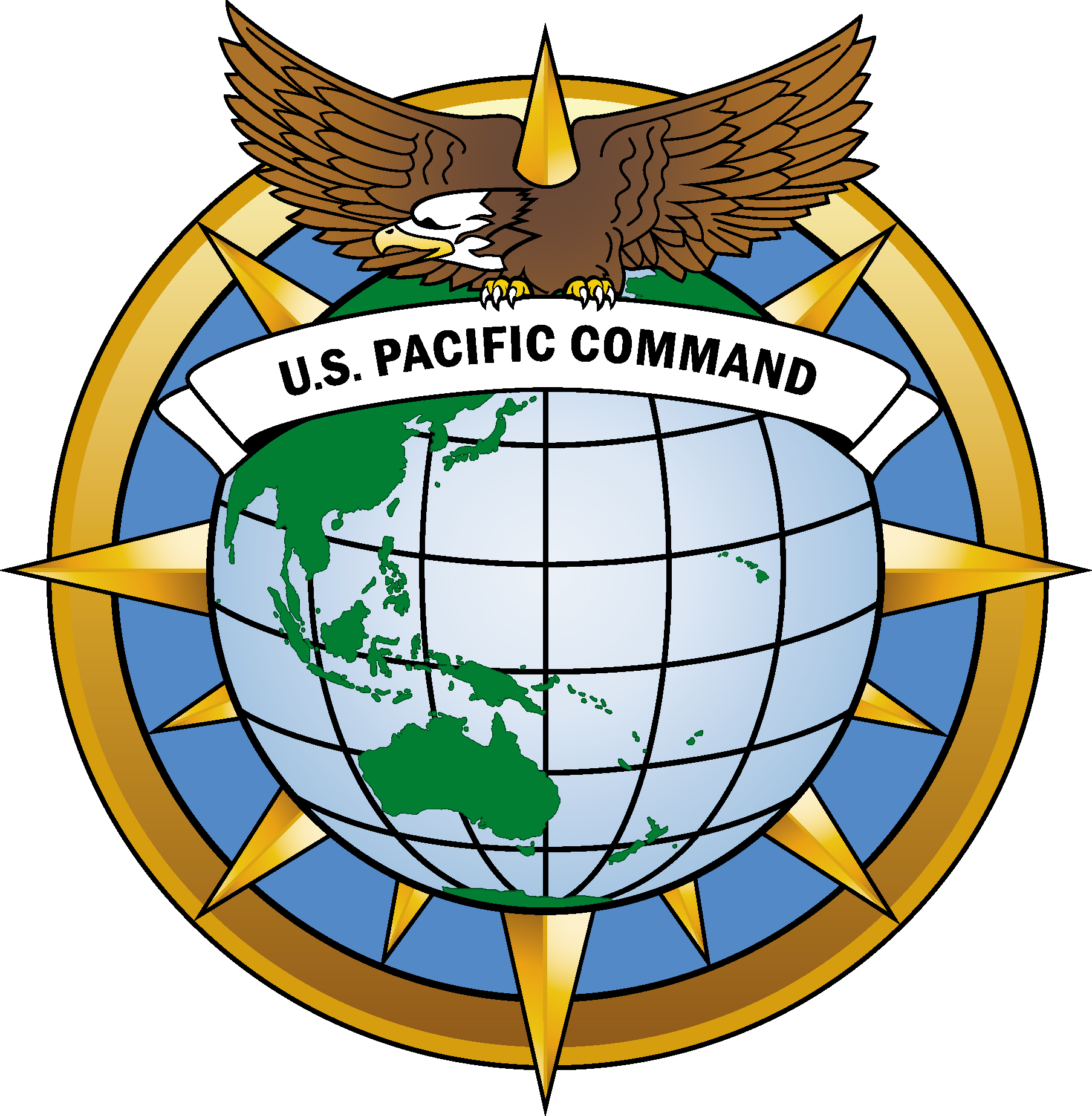
Emblem of the United States Pacific Command

This is a list of all commanders, deputy commanders, senior enlisted leaders, and chiefs of staff of the United States Pacific Command.

== Current headquarters staff ==
- Samuel Paparo, Commander
  - George B. Rowell, Deputy Commander
  - Eric D. Cook, Senior Enlisted Leader
    - Michael Drowley, Chief of Staff
      - Angenene L. Robertson, Director, Personnel (J1)
      - Thomas M. Henderschedt, Director, Intelligence (J2)
      - Patrick J. Hannifin, Director, Operations (J3)
        - Neil R. Richardson, Deputy Director, Operations (J3)
      - Martine S. Kidd, Director, Logistics and Engineering (J4)
      - Vacant, Director, Strategic Planning and Policy (J5)
      - Michael L. Smith, Director, Command, Control, Communications and Cyber (J6)
      - Richard A. Goodman, Director, Training and Exercises (J7)

== List of leaders of the United States Pacific Command ==
=== Commanders ===
Commander of the United States Pacific Command
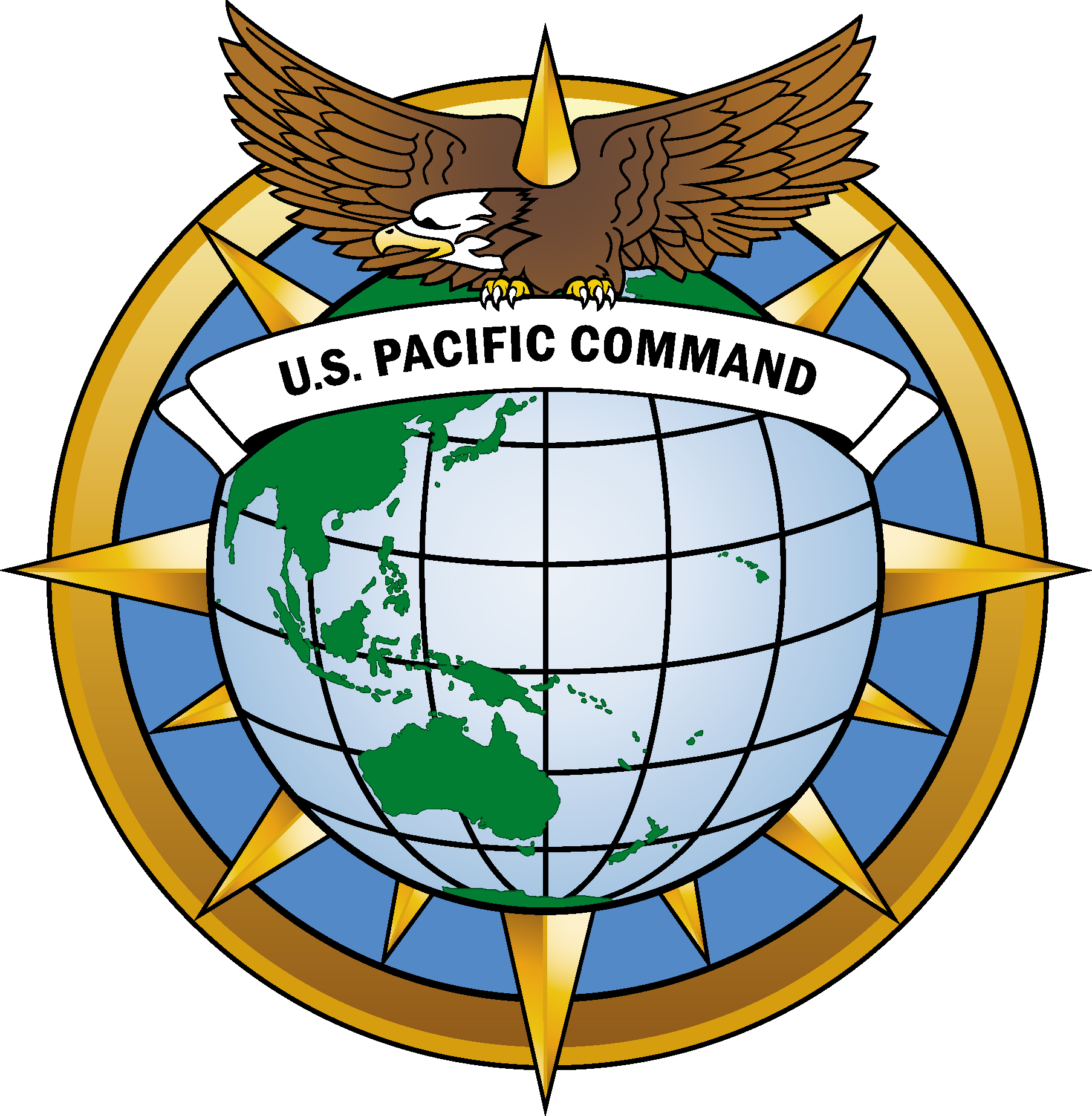
- Emblem of the United States Pacific Command

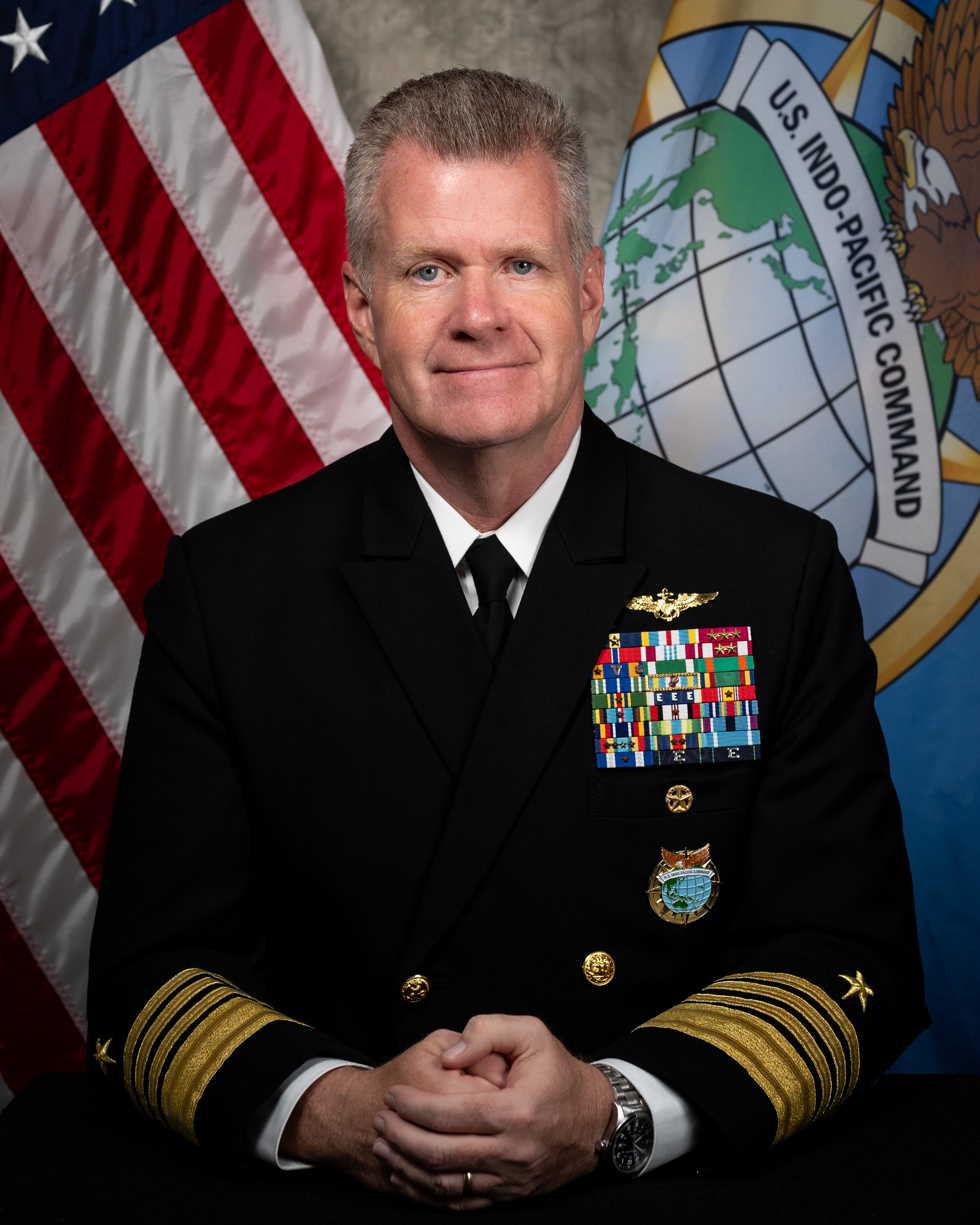
- Incumbent; Admiral Samuel Paparo, USN since 3 May 2024
- United States Department of Defense
- Type: Unified combatant commander
- Abbreviation: CDRUSINDOPACOM
- Reports to: President of the United States; Secretary of Defense
- Seat: Camp H. M. Smith, Hawaii, U.S.
- Nominator: Secretary of Defense
- Appointer: The president; with Senate advice and consent
- Term length: 2–3 years; (approx.)
- Constituting instrument: 10 U.S.C. § 164
- Precursor: Commander in Chief, Pacific Ocean Areas
- Inaugural holder: ADM John H. Towers
- Formation: 1 January 1947
- Deputy: Deputy Commander, U.S. Indo-Pacific Command

No.	Commander		Term			Service branch
No.	Portrait	Name	Took office	Left office	Term length	Service branch
Commander in Chief, Pacific Command / Commander in Chief, U.S. Pacific Fleet / Military Governor, Marshall, Caroline, and Mariana Islands (CINCPAC/CINCPACFLT)
1	John H. Towers	Admiral; John H. Towers (1885–1955)	1 January 1947	28 February 1947	58 days	U.S. Navy
2	Louis E. Denfeld	Admiral; Louis E. Denfeld (1891–1972)	28 February 1947	18 July 1947	140 days	U.S. Navy
Commander in Chief, Pacific Command / Commander in Chief, U.S. Pacific Fleet / High Commissioner, Trust Territory of the Pacific Islands (CINCPAC/CINCPACFLT)
2	Louis E. Denfeld	Admiral; Louis E. Denfeld (1891–1972)	18 July 1947	3 December 1947	138 days	U.S. Navy
3	DeWitt C. Ramsey	Admiral; DeWitt C. Ramsey (1888–1961)	12 January 1948	30 April 1949	1 year, 108 days	U.S. Navy
4	Arthur W. Radford	Admiral; Arthur W. Radford (1896–1973)	30 April 1949	6 January 1951	1 year, 251 days	U.S. Navy
Commander in Chief, Pacific Command / Commander in Chief, U.S. Pacific Fleet (CINCPAC/CINCPACFLT)
4	Arthur W. Radford	Admiral; Arthur W. Radford (1896–1973)	6 January 1951	10 July 1953	2 years, 185 days	U.S. Navy
5	Felix B. Stump	Admiral; Felix B. Stump (1894–1972)	10 July 1953	14 January 1958	4 years, 188 days	U.S. Navy
Commander in Chief, Pacific Command (CINCPAC)
5	Felix B. Stump	Admiral; Felix B. Stump (1894–1972)	14 January 1958	31 July 1958	198 days	U.S. Navy
6	Harry D. Felt	Admiral; Harry D. Felt (1902–1992)	31 July 1958	30 June 1964	5 years, 335 days	U.S. Navy
7	Ulysses S. Grant Sharp	Admiral; Ulysses S. Grant Sharp (1906–2001)	30 June 1964	31 July 1968	4 years, 31 days	U.S. Navy
8	John S. McCain Jr.	Admiral; John S. McCain Jr. (1911–1981)	31 July 1968	1 September 1972	4 years, 32 days	U.S. Navy
9	Noel A.M. Gayler	Admiral; Noel A.M. Gayler (1914–2011)	1 September 1972	30 August 1976	3 years, 364 days	U.S. Navy
10	Maurice F. Weisner	Admiral; Maurice F. Weisner (1917–2006)	30 August 1976	31 October 1979	3 years, 62 days	U.S. Navy
11	Robert L.J. Long	Admiral; Robert L.J. Long (1920–2002)	31 October 1979	1 July 1983	3 years, 243 days	U.S. Navy
12	William J. Crowe Jr.	Admiral; William J. Crowe Jr. (1925–2007)	1 July 1983	28 October 1983	119 days	U.S. Navy
Commander in Chief, U.S. Pacific Command (USCINCPAC)
12	William J. Crowe Jr.	Admiral; William J. Crowe Jr. (1925–2007)	28 October 1983	18 September 1985	1 year, 325 days	U.S. Navy
13	Ronald J. Hays	Admiral; Ronald J. Hays (1928–2021)	18 September 1985	30 September 1988	3 years, 12 days	U.S. Navy
14	Huntington Hardisty	Admiral; Huntington Hardisty (1929–2003)	30 September 1988	1 March 1991	2 years, 152 days	U.S. Navy
15	Charles R. Larson	Admiral; Charles R. Larson (1936–2014)	1 March 1991	11 July 1994	2 years, 152 days	U.S. Navy
16	Richard C. Macke	Admiral; Richard C. Macke (born 1938)	19 July 1994	31 January 1996	1 year, 196 days	U.S. Navy
17	Joseph W. Prueher	Admiral; Joseph W. Prueher (born 1942)	31 January 1996	20 February 1999	3 years, 20 days	U.S. Navy
18	Dennis C. Blair	Admiral; Dennis C. Blair (born 1947)	20 February 1999	2 May 2002	3 years, 71 days	U.S. Navy
19	Thomas B. Fargo	Admiral; Thomas B. Fargo (born 1948)	2 May 2002	24 October 2002	175 days	U.S. Navy
Commander, U.S. Pacific Command (CDRUSPACOM)
19	Thomas B. Fargo	Admiral; Thomas B. Fargo (born 1948)	24 October 2002	26 February 2005	2 years, 125 days	U.S. Navy
20	William J. Fallon	Admiral; William J. Fallon (born 1944)	26 February 2005	12 March 2007	2 years, 14 days	U.S. Navy
-	Daniel P. Leaf	Lieutenant General; Daniel P. Leaf (born 1952); Acting	12 March 2007	26 March 2007	14 days	U.S. Air Force
21	Timothy J. Keating	Admiral; Timothy J. Keating (born 1948)	26 March 2007	19 October 2009	2 years, 207 days	U.S. Navy
22	Robert F. Willard	Admiral; Robert F. Willard (born 1950)	19 October 2009	9 March 2012	2 years, 142 days	U.S. Navy
23	Samuel J. Locklear III	Admiral; Samuel J. Locklear III (born 1954)	9 March 2012	27 May 2015	3 years, 79 days	U.S. Navy
24	Harry B. Harris Jr.	Admiral; Harry B. Harris Jr. (born 1956)	27 May 2015	30 May 2018	3 years, 3 days	U.S. Navy
Commander, U.S. Indo-Pacific Command (CDRUSINDOPACOM)
25	Philip S. Davidson	Admiral; Philip S. Davidson (born 1960)	30 May 2018	30 April 2021	2 years, 335 days	U.S. Navy
26	John C. Aquilino	Admiral; John C. Aquilino (born 1962)	30 April 2021	3 May 2024	3 years, 3 days	U.S. Navy
27	Samuel Paparo	Admiral; Samuel Paparo (born 1964)	3 May 2024	16 June 2026	2 years, 44 days	U.S. Navy
Commander, U.S. Pacific Command (CDRUSPACOM)
27	Samuel Paparo	Admiral; Samuel Paparo (born 1964)	16 June 2026	Incumbent	123 days	U.S. Navy

=== Deputy commanders ===
No.	Deputy Commander		Term			Service branch
No.	Portrait	Name	Took office	Left office	Term length	Service branch
Deputy Commander in Chief, U.S. Pacific Command (DCINCPAC)
1	Robert W. Sennewald	Lieutenant General; Robert W. Sennewald (1929–2023)	26 October 1981	30 May 1982	216 days	U.S. Army
2	Joseph T. Palastra Jr.	Lieutenant General; Joseph T. Palastra Jr. (1931–2015)	1 July 1982	26 June 1984	1 year, 361 days	U.S. Army
3	William H. Schneider	Lieutenant General; William H. Schneider (1934–1994)	29 June 1984	18 May 1987	2 years, 323 days	U.S. Army
-	Richard T. Trundy	Major General; Richard T. Trundy (born 1932); Acting	18 May 1987	21 June 1987	34 days	U.S. Marine Corps
4	Michael P. C. Carns	Lieutenant General; Michael P. C. Carns (born 1937)	22 June 1987	12 September 1989	2 years, 82 days	U.S. Air Force
5	Jack B. Farris	Lieutenant General; Jack B. Farris (1935–2019)	12 September 1989	20 May 1991	1 year, 250 days	U.S. Army
-	Leo M. Childs	Major General; Leo M. Childs; Acting	20 May 1991	5 June 1991	16 days	U.S. Army
6	Harold T. Fields Jr.	Lieutenant General; Harold T. Fields Jr. (born 1938)	5 June 1991	11 July 1994	3 years, 36 days	U.S. Army
-	Ted Hopgood	Major General; Ted Hopgood (born 1943); Acting	19 July 1994	13 August 1994	25 days	U.S. Marine Corps
7	David A. Bramlett	Lieutenant General; David A. Bramlett (born 1941)	26 September 1994	28 June 1996	1 year, 276 days	U.S. Army
-	William J. McDaniel	Rear Admiral; William J. McDaniel (born 1943); Acting	28 June 1996	17 July 1996	19 days	U.S. Navy
8	Joseph E. DeFrancisco	Lieutenant General; Joseph E. DeFrancisco (born 1942)	17 July 1996	31 August 1998	2 years, 45 days	U.S. Army
9	Randolph W. House	Lieutenant General; Randolph W. House	30 September 1998	2 October 2000	2 years, 2 days	U.S. Army
10	Thomas R. Case	Lieutenant General; Thomas R. Case (born 1946)	2 October 2000	1 June 2002	1 year, 242 days	U.S. Air Force
-	Ronald L. Lowe	Major General; Ronald L. Lowe; Acting	1 June 2002	8 August 2002	68 days	U.S. Army
11	Robert R. Dierker	Lieutenant General; Robert R. Dierker (born 1950)	8 August 2002	24 October 2002	77 days	U.S. Air Force
Deputy Commander, U.S. Pacific Command (DCDRUSPACOM)
11	Robert R. Dierker	Lieutenant General; Robert R. Dierker (born 1950)	24 October 2002	October 2004	~1 year, 343 days	U.S. Air Force
12	Gary Roughead	Vice Admiral; Gary Roughead (born 1951)	October 2004	9 July 2005	~281 days	U.S. Navy
-	W. V. Alford Jr.	Rear Admiral; W. V. Alford Jr. (born 1951); Acting	9 July 2005	12 October 2005	95 days	U.S. Navy
13	Daniel P. Leaf	Lieutenant General; Daniel P. Leaf (born 1952)	12 October 2005	30 April 2008	2 years, 201 days	U.S. Air Force
14	Douglas M. Fraser	Lieutenant General; Douglas M. Fraser (born 1950)	30 April 2008	12 July 2009	1 year, 73 days	U.S. Air Force
15	Daniel J. Darnell	Lieutenant General; Daniel J. Darnell (born 1953)	12 July 2009	1 March 2012	2 years, 233 days	U.S. Air Force
16	Thomas L. Conant	Lieutenant General; Thomas L. Conant	1 March 2012	6 June 2014	2 years, 97 days	U.S. Marine Corps
17	Anthony G. Crutchfield	Lieutenant General; Anthony G. Crutchfield (born 1960)	6 June 2014	30 April 2017	2 years, 328 days	U.S. Army
18	Bryan P. Fenton	Lieutenant General; Bryan P. Fenton (born 1965)	1 May 2017	30 May 2018	1 year, 29 days	U.S. Army
Deputy Commander, U.S. Indo-Pacific Command (DCDRUSINDOPACOM)
18	Bryan P. Fenton	Lieutenant General; Bryan P. Fenton (born 1965)	30 May 2018	September 2019	~1 year, 94 days	U.S. Army
19	Michael A. Minihan	Lieutenant General; Michael A. Minihan (born 1967)	September 2019	15 August 2021	~1 year, 348 days	U.S. Air Force
20	Stephen D. Sklenka	Lieutenant General; Stephen D. Sklenka (born 1966)	16 August 2021	August 2024	~2 years, 351 days	U.S. Marine Corps
21	Joshua M. Rudd	Lieutenant General; Joshua M. Rudd (born c. 1971)	25 September 2024	20 March 2026	1 year, 176 days	U.S. Army
21	George B. Rowell	Lieutenant General; George B. Rowell (born c. 1970)	14 May 2026	16 June 2026	33 days	U.S. Marine Corps
Deputy Commander, U.S. Pacific Command (DCDRUSPACOM)
21	George B. Rowell	Lieutenant General; George B. Rowell (born c. 1970)	14 May 2026	Incumbent	123 days	U.S. Marine Corps

=== Senior enlisted leaders ===
No.	Senior Enlisted Leader		Term			Service branch
No.	Portrait	Name	Took office	Left office	Term length	Service branch
Senior Enlisted Leader, U.S. Pacific Command
1	William T. Kinney	Sergeant Major; William T. Kinney	June 2004	June 2007	~3 years, 0 days	U.S. Marine Corps
2	James A. Roy	Chief Master Sergeant; James A. Roy (born 1964)	June 2007	October 2009	~2 years, 122 days	U.S. Air Force
3	Iuniasolua T. Savusa	Command Sergeant Major; Iuniasolua T. Savusa	October 2009	December 2011	~2 years, 61 days	U.S. Army
-	James L. Davis	Sergeant Major; James L. Davis; Acting	December 2011	April 2012	~122 days	U.S. Army
4	Mark W. Rudes	Fleet Master Chief; Mark W. Rudes	April 2012	18 July 2016	~4 years, 108 days	U.S. Navy
5	Anthony A. Spadaro	Sergeant Major; Anthony A. Spadaro	18 July 2016	30 May 2018	1 year, 316 days	U.S. Marine Corps
Senior Enlisted Leader, U.S. Indo-Pacific Command
6	Anthony A. Spadaro	Sergeant Major; Anthony A. Spadaro	30 May 2018	January 2020	~1 year, 216 days	U.S. Marine Corps
7	Shane W. Shorter	Command Sergeant Major; Shane W. Shorter	January 2020	August 2021	~1 year, 212 days	U.S. Army
8	James Honea	Fleet Master Chief; James Honea	August 2021	30 June 2022	~333 days	U.S. Navy
9	David L. Isom	Fleet Master Chief; David L. Isom	30 June 2022	20 June 2025	2 years, 355 days	U.S. Navy
10	Eric D. Cook	Sergeant Major; Eric D. Cook	26 June 2025	16 June 2026	355 days	U.S. Marine Corps
Senior Enlisted Leader, U.S. Pacific Command
10	Eric D. Cook	Sergeant Major; Eric D. Cook	26 June 2025	Incumbent	123 days	U.S. Marine Corps

=== Chiefs of staff ===
No.	Chief of Staff		Term			Service branch
No.	Portrait	Name	Took office	Left office	Term length	Service branch
Chief of Staff, Pacific Command
1	George W. Anderson Jr.	Vice Admiral; George W. Anderson Jr. (1906–1992)	1 July 1957	January 1958	~184 days	U.S. Navy
2	Herbert D. Riley	Vice Admiral; Herbert D. Riley (1904–1973)	8 February 1958	16 May 1961	3 years, 97 days	U.S. Navy
3	Verdi B. Barnes	Lieutenant General; Verdi B. Barnes (1907–1980)	16 May 1961	30 April 1965	3 years, 349 days	U.S. Army
4	Paul S. Emrick	Lieutenant General; Paul S. Emrick (1915–1992)	1 May 1965	30 June 1967	2 years, 60 days	U.S. Air Force
5	Claire E. Hutchin Jr.	Lieutenant General; Claire E. Hutchin Jr. (1916–1980)	1 July 1967	30 August 1969	2 years, 60 days	U.S. Army
6	Michael S. Davison	Lieutenant General; Michael S. Davison (1917–2006)	30 August 1969	28 March 1970	210 days	U.S. Army
7	Charles A. Corcoran	Lieutenant General; Charles A. Corcoran (1914–2013)	28 March 1970	15 August 1973	3 years, 140 days	U.S. Army
-	John M. McNabb	Major General; John M. McNabb (born 1917); Acting	15 August 1973	30 September 1973	46 days	U.S. Air Force
8	William G. Moore Jr.	Lieutenant General; William G. Moore Jr. (1920–2012)	1 October 1973	12 October 1976	3 years, 11 days	U.S. Air Force
9	Leroy J. Manor	Lieutenant General; Leroy J. Manor (1921–2021)	12 October 1976	30 June 1978	1 year, 261 days	U.S. Air Force
10	Marion L. Boswell	Lieutenant General; Marion L. Boswell (1923–2002)	30 June 1978	1 June 1979	336 days	U.S. Air Force
11	Freddie L. Poston	Lieutenant General; Freddie L. Poston (1925–2016)	1 June 1979	8 July 1981	2 years, 37 days	U.S. Air Force
12	Robert W. Sennewald	Lieutenant General; Robert W. Sennewald (born 1929)	20 July 1981	26 October 1981	98 days	U.S. Army
Dual-hatted as deputy commander of U.S. Pacific Command (26 October 1981–8 August 2002)
Chief of Staff, U.S. Pacific Command
13	Ronald L. Lowe	Major General; Ronald L. Lowe	9 August 2002	31 July 2004	1 year, 357 days	U.S. Army
14	W. V. Alford Jr.	Rear Admiral; W. V. Alford Jr. (born 1951)	1 August 2004	23 August 2007	3 years, 22 days	U.S. Navy
15	Stephen D. Tom	Major General; Stephen D. Tom	24 August 2007	29 June 2010	2 years, 309 days	U.S. Army
16	Robin M. Watters	Rear Admiral; Robin M. Watters (born 1955)	30 June 2010	7 September 2012	2 years, 69 days	U.S. Navy
15	Anthony G. Crutchfield	Major General; Anthony G. Crutchfield (born 1960)	7 September 2012	May 2014	~1 year, 236 days	U.S. Army
16	John L. Dolan	Major General; John L. Dolan (born 1964)	May 2014	May 2015	~1 year, 0 days	U.S. Air Force
17	Eric P. Wendt	Major General; Eric P. Wendt	May 2015	July 2016	~1 year, 61 days	U.S. Army
18	Kevin B. Schneider	Major General; Kevin B. Schneider	July 2016	30 May 2018	~1 year, 333 days	U.S. Air Force
Chief of Staff, U.S. Indo-Pacific Command
18	Kevin B. Schneider	Major General; Kevin B. Schneider	30 May 2018	31 January 2019	246 days	U.S. Air Force
19	Michael A. Minihan	Major General; Michael A. Minihan (born 1967)	1 February 2019	September 2019	~212 days	U.S. Air Force
20	Ronald P. Clark	Major General; Ronald P. Clark	December 2019	30 July 2021	~1 year, 241 days	U.S. Army
21	James B. Jarrard	Major General; James B. Jarrard	30 July 2021	27 July 2022	362 days	U.S. Army
22	Joshua M. Rudd	Major General; Joshua M. Rudd	28 July 2022	5 September 2024	2 years, 39 days	U.S. Army
23	Joel Carey	Major General; Joel Carey	~5 September 2024	~25 February 2026	~1 year, 173 days	U.S. Air Force
23	Michael Drowley	Major General; Michael Drowley	~25 February 2026	16 June 2026	~111 days	U.S. Air Force
Chief of Staff, U.S. Pacific Command
23	Michael Drowley	Major General; Michael Drowley	16 June 2026	Incumbent	~123 days	U.S. Air Force

== See also ==
- Leadership of the United States Africa Command
- Leadership of the United States European Command
- Leadership of the United States Northern Command
- Leadership of the United States Space Command
- Leadership of the United States Cyber Command
- Leadership of the United States Strategic Command
- Leadership of the United States Transportation Command
