= William J. Hartman =

U.S. Army general

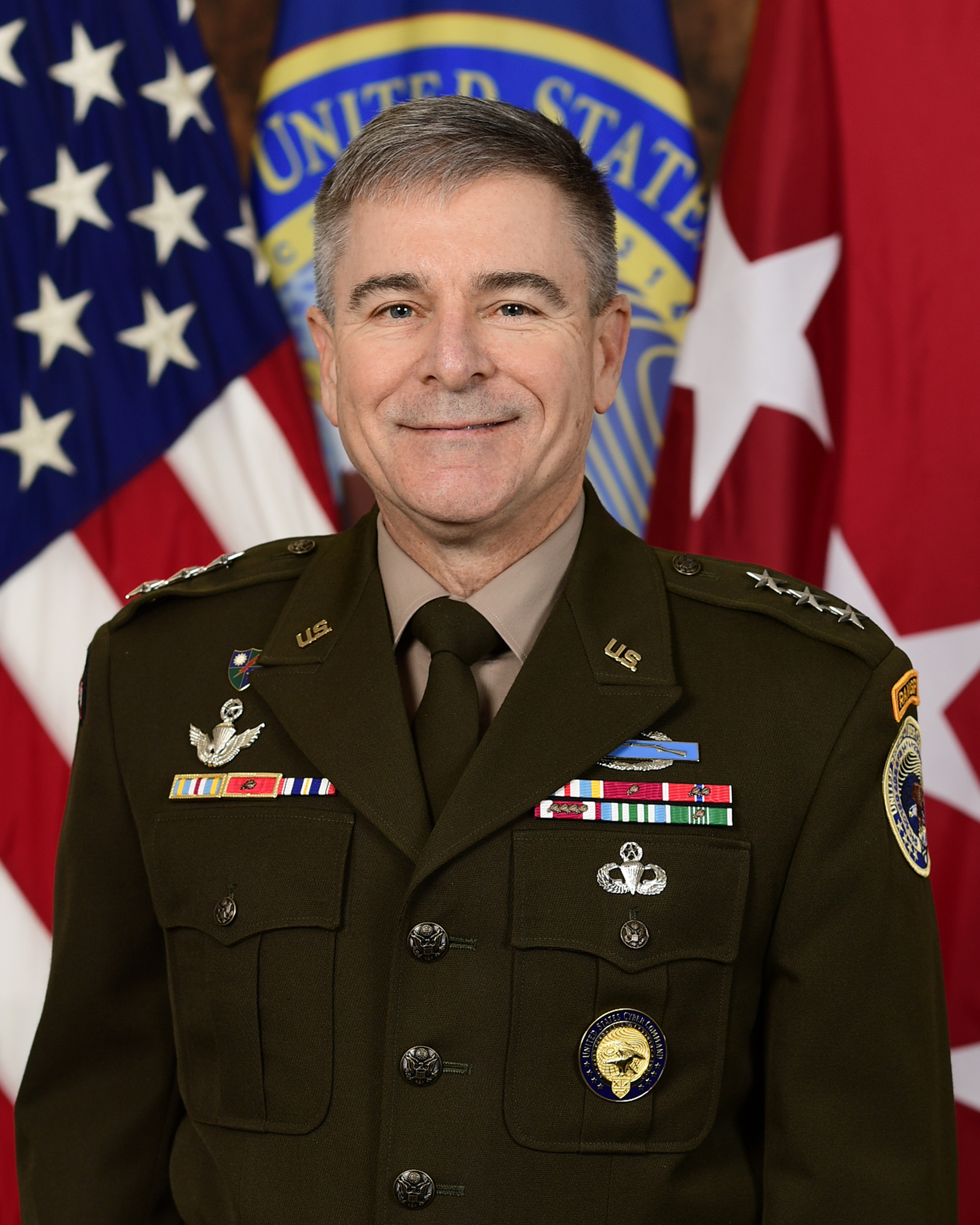
- Official portrait, 2024
- Born: Mobile, Alabama, U.S.
- Military career
- Allegiance: United States
- Branch: United States Army
- Service years: 1989–2026
- Rank: Lieutenant General
- Commands: Cyber National Mission Force; 780th Military Intelligence Brigade; 524nd Military Intelligence Battalion
- Conflicts: Syrian civil war Iraq War; War in Afghanistan
- Awards: Defense Superior Service Medal; Legion of Merit (2); Bronze Star Medal (3)

William J. Hartman is a retired American lieutenant general who served as the acting commander of United States Cyber Command, director of the National Security Agency and chief of the Central Security Service from 3 April 2025 to 16 March 2026, and as the deputy commander of the United States Cyber Command from 16 January 2024 to 16 March 2026. He previously served as the commander of the Cyber National Mission Force from August 2019 to January 2024.

Hartman was commissioned in the United States Army through the Army Reserve Officers' Training Corps at University of South Alabama, where he graduated.

In May 2023, Hartman was nominated for promotion to lieutenant general with assignment as the deputy commander of United States Cyber Command.

On 3 April 2025, Timothy D. Haugh, the director of the National Security Agency (NSA), was removed from his position. Hartman was named as acting director. On 4 September, Politico reported that president Donald Trump was expected to name Hartman as the commander of Cyber Command and the director of the NSA but was passed over. On 10 March 2026, Joshua Rudd was confirmed by the Senate to lead Cyber Command and the NSA.

Military offices
Preceded by Timothy D. Haugh	Commander of the Cyber National Mission Force; 2019–2024	Succeeded by Lorna M. Mahlock
Preceded by Timothy D. Haugh	Deputy Commander of the United States Cyber Command; 2024–2026	Succeeded by Lorna M. Mahlock
Preceded by Timothy D. Haugh	Commander of the United States Cyber Command, Director of the National Security Agency, and Chief of the Central Security Service; Acting; 2025–2026	Succeeded by Joshua M. Rudd
