= Leadership of the United States Cyber Command =

U.S. Cyber Command leadership

Emblem of the United States Cyber Command

This is a list of all commanders, deputy commanders, senior enlisted leaders, and chiefs of staff of the United States Cyber Command.

== Current headquarters staff ==
- Joshua M. Rudd, Commander
  - Lorna M. Mahlock, Deputy Commander
    - Kevin P. Lenox, Chief of Staff
      - Kayle M. Stevens, Director, Intelligence (J2)
      - Ronald A. Foy, Director, Operations (J3)
        - Unknown, Deputy Director, Current Operations (J3 DDCO)
        - Stephen J. Miko, Deputy Director, Future Operations (J3 DDFO)
      - Stephanie R. Ahern, Director, Plans and Policy (J5)
      - Unknown, Director, Exercises and Training (J7)
      - Unknown, Director, Capability and Resource Integration (J8)
    - Kenneth M. Bruce, Jr., Senior Enlisted Leader

== List of leaders of the United States Cyber Command ==
=== Commanders ===
Commander of the United States Cyber Command
- Emblem of the United States Cyber Command

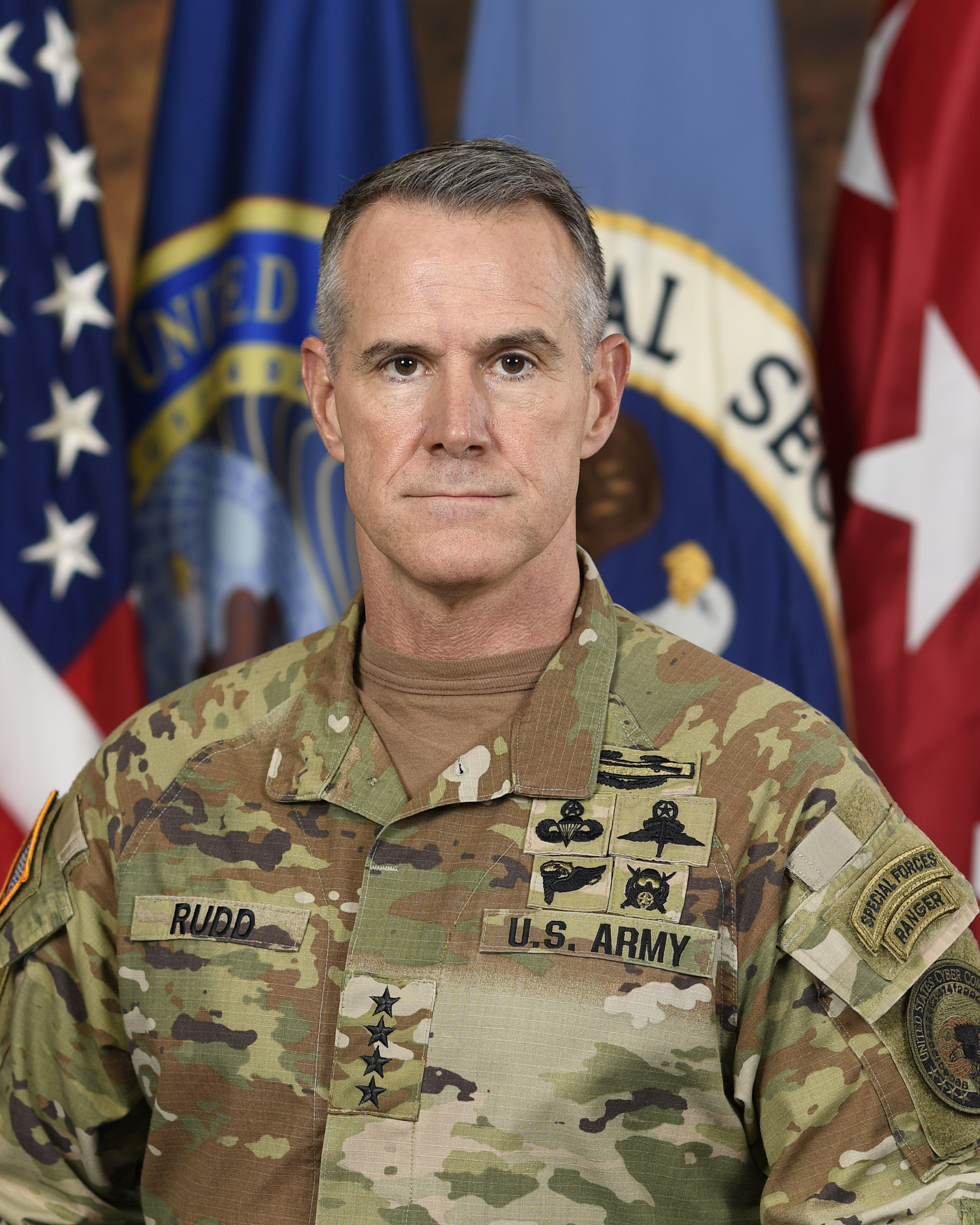
- Incumbent; General Joshua Rudd, USA since 16 March 2026
- United States Department of Defense
- Type: Unified combatant commander
- Abbreviation: CDRUSCYBERCOM
- Reports to: President of the United States; Secretary of Defense
- Nominator: Secretary of Defense
- Appointer: The president; with Senate advice and consent
- Term length: 2–3 years; (approx.)
- Constituting instrument: 10 U.S.C. § 167b
- Formation: 21 May 2010
- First holder: Keith B. Alexander
- Deputy: Deputy Commander, United States Cyber Command

No.	Commander		Term			Service branch
No.	Portrait	Name	Took office	Left office	Term length	Service branch
1	Keith B. Alexander	General; Keith B. Alexander (born 1951)	21 May 2010	28 March 2014	3 years, 311 days	U.S. Army
–	Jon M. Davis	Lieutenant General; Jon M. Davis; Acting	29 March 2014	2 April 2014	4 days	U.S. Marine Corps
2	Michael S. Rogers	Admiral; Michael S. Rogers (born 1959)	3 April 2014	4 May 2018	4 years, 31 days	U.S. Navy
3	Paul M. Nakasone	General; Paul M. Nakasone (born 1963)	4 May 2018	2 February 2024	5 years, 270 days	U.S. Army
4	Timothy D. Haugh	General; Timothy D. Haugh (born 1969)	2 February 2024	3 April 2025	1 year, 60 days	U.S. Air Force
–	William J. Hartman	Lieutenant General; William J. Hartman; Acting	3 April 2025	16 March 2026	347 days	U.S. Army
5	Joshua Rudd	General; Joshua Rudd (born c. 1971)	16 March 2026	Incumbent	249 days	U.S. Army

=== Deputy Commanders ===
No.	Deputy Commander		Term			Service branch
No.	Portrait	Name	Took office	Left office	Term length	Service branch
1	Robert E. Schmidle Jr.	Lieutenant General; Robert E. Schmidle Jr.	August 2010	May 2012	~1 year, 274 days	U.S. Marine Corps
2	Jon M. Davis	Lieutenant General; Jon M. Davis	May 2012	June 2014	~2 years, 31 days	U.S. Marine Corps
3	James K. McLaughlin	Lieutenant General; James K. McLaughlin	August 2014	~September 2017	~3 years, 31 days	U.S. Air Force
4	William C. Mayville Jr.	Lieutenant General; William C. Mayville Jr. (Note: Assignment not publicly announced by U.S. Department of Defense. Mayville's deputy position was concerned with the elevation of USCYBERCOM to a fully autonomous command separate from the National Security Agency. Mayville retired in 2018)	~July 2017	March 2018	~243 days	U.S. Army
5	Vincent Stewart	Lieutenant General; Vincent Stewart (Note: Assignment publicly announced by U.S. Department of Defense. Stewart's deputy position was concerned with day-to-day operations of USCYBERCOM.) (1958–2023)	~3 October 2017	~May 2019	~1 year, 210 days	U.S. Marine Corps
6	Ross A. Myers	Vice Admiral; Ross A. Myers	May 2019	~18 September 2020	~1 year, 140 days	U.S. Navy
7	Charles L. Moore	Lieutenant General; Charles L. Moore	~18 September 2020	26 July 2022	~1 year, 311 days	U.S. Air Force
8	Timothy D. Haugh	Lieutenant General; Timothy D. Haugh	26 July 2022	16 January 2024	1 year, 174 days	U.S. Air Force
9	William J. Hartman	Lieutenant General; William J. Hartman	16 January 2024	20 March 2026	2 years, 63 days	U.S. Army
10	Lorna Mahlock	Lieutenant General; Lorna Mahlock (born 1968/1969)	20 March 2026	Incumbent	245 days	U.S. Marine Corps

=== Senior Enlisted Leaders ===
No.	Senior Enlisted Leader		Term			Service branch
No.	Portrait	Name	Took office	Left office	Term length	Service branch
1	Kevin Slater	Chief Master Sergeant; Kevin Slater	April 2012	March 2015	2 years, 334 days	U.S. Air Force
2	David C. Redmond	Command Sergeant Major; David C. Redmond	March 2015	~16 March 2018	3 years, 15 days	U.S. Army
3	Scott H. Stalker	Master Gunnery Sergeant; Scott H. Stalker	16 March 2018	28 August 2020	2 years, 165 days	U.S. Marine Corps
-	Unknown	Unknown	28 August 2020	25 September 2020	28 days	Unknown
-	Sheryl D. Lyon	Command Sergeant Major; Sheryl D. Lyon	25 September 2020	8 September 2023	2 years, 348 days	U.S. Army
-	Kenneth M. Bruce	Chief Master Sergeant; Kenneth M. Bruce	8 September 2023	Incumbent	3 years, 73 days	U.S. Air Force

=== Chiefs of Staff ===
No.	Chief of Staff		Term			Service branch
No.	Portrait	Name	Took office	Left office	Term length	Service branch
1	Jim H. Keffer	Major General; Jim H. Keffer	September 2013	~1 November 2015	~2 years, 61 days	U.S. Air Force
2	Joseph A. Brendler	Major General; Joseph A. Brendler	~1 November 2015	~August 2016	~274 days	U.S. Army
3	Stephen Fogarty	Major General; Stephen Fogarty	August 2016	~11 May 2018	~1 year, 283 days	U.S. Army
4	Ross A. Myers	Rear Admiral; Ross A. Myers	~11 May 2018	~May 2019	~1 year	U.S. Navy
5	John B. Morrison	Major General; John B. Morrison	~6 June 2019	~15 July 2020	~1 year, 39 days	U.S. Army
6	David Isaacson	Major General; David Isaacson	15 July 2020	9 June 2022	1 year, 329 days	U.S. Army
7	Bradley L. Pyburn	Major General; Bradley L. Pyburn	9 June 2022	14 June 2024	2 years, 5 days	U.S. Air Force
8	Dennis Velez	Rear Admiral; Dennis Velez	14 June 2024	~1 July 2025	~1 year, 17 days	U.S. Navy
9	Kevin P. Lenox	Rear Admiral; Kevin P. Lenox	~July 2025	Incumbent	~1 year, 142 days	U.S. Navy

== See also ==
- United States Cyber Command
- Leadership of the United States Africa Command
- Leadership of the United States European Command
- Leadership of the United States Indo-Pacific Command
- Leadership of the United States Northern Command
- Leadership of the United States Space Command
- Leadership of the United States Strategic Command
- Leadership of the United States Transportation Command
