= Matteo Martemucci =

U.S. Air Force general

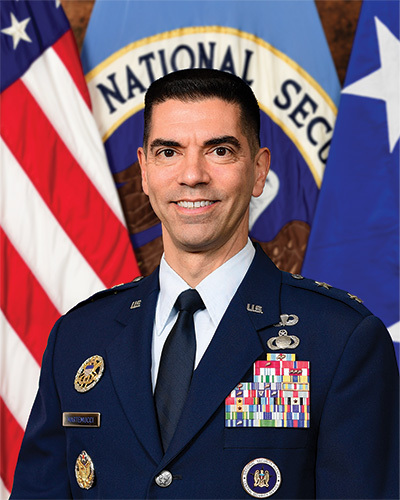
- Military career
- Allegiance: United States
- Branch: United States Air Force
- Rank: Major General
- Nickname: Mooch
- Commands: 70th Intelligence, Surveillance and Reconnaissance Wing; 318th Cyberspace Operations Group; 315th Cyberspace Operations Squadron
- Awards: Defense Superior Service Medal (2); Legion of Merit (3)

Matteo G. Martemucci is a United States Air Force major general who currently serves as the deputy chief of the Central Security Service since July 2023. He most recently served as the director for intelligence of the United States Cyber Command. Prior to that, he was the director for intelligence of the Combined Joint Task Force – Operation Inherent Resolve.

In March 2023, Martemucci was nominated for promotion to major general.

Military offices
Preceded by Thomas Hensley	Commander of the 70th Intelligence, Surveillance and Reconnaissance Wing; 2017–2019	Succeeded by Brian Tyler
Preceded by Thomas Hensley	Director of Intelligence of the Combined Joint Task Force – Operation Inherent Resolve; 2019–2020	Succeeded by ???
Preceded by Douglas S. Coppinger	Director of Intelligence of the United States Cyber Command; 2020–2023	Succeeded by Melissa A. Stone
Preceded by Douglas S. Coppinger	Deputy Chief of the Central Security Service; 2023–present	Incumbent
