= Joshua Rudd =

American general

Josh Rudd
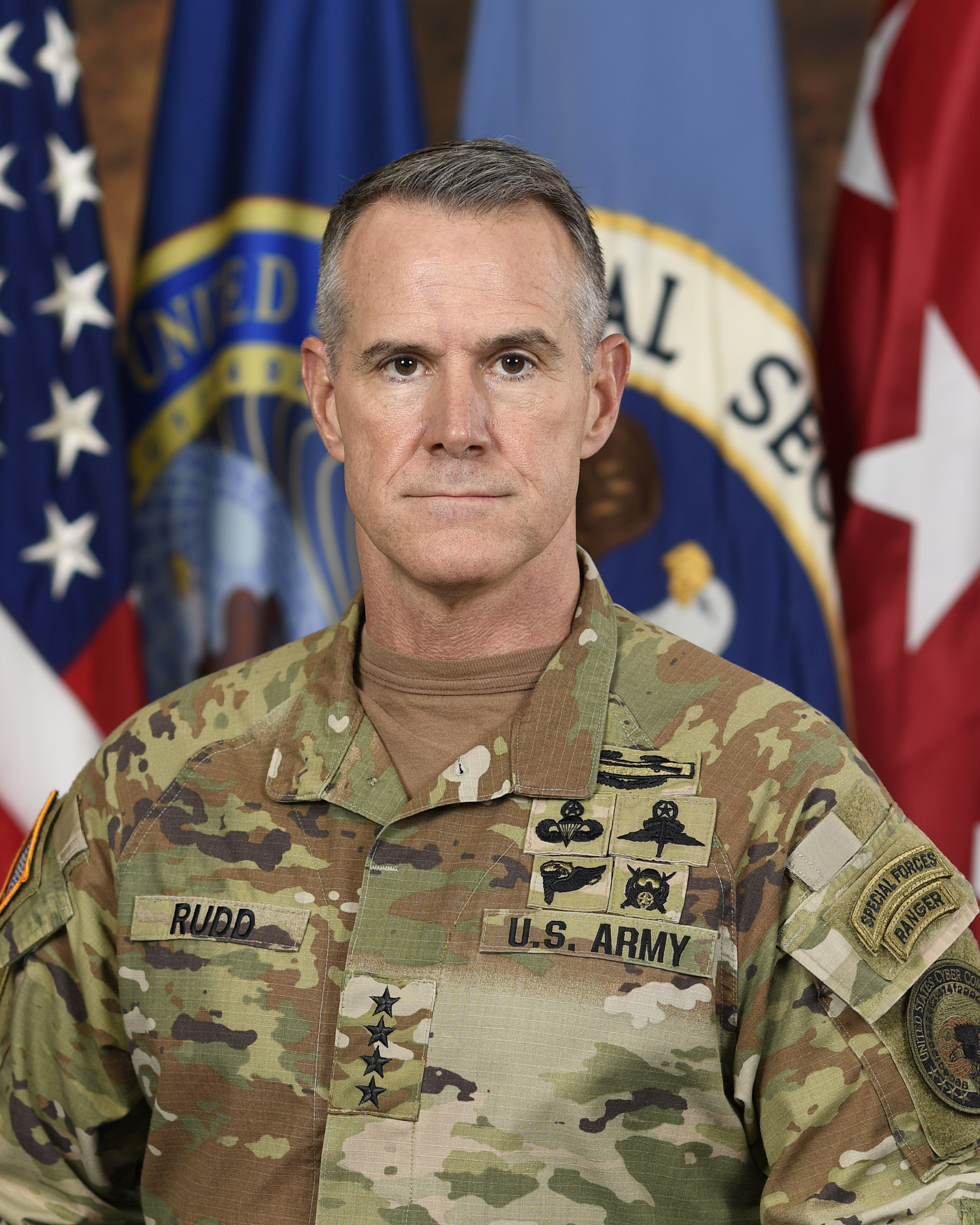
- Official portrait, 2026

5th Commander of United States Cyber Command
- Incumbent
- Assumed office 16 March 2026
- President: Donald Trump
- Preceded by: Timothy D. Haugh; William J. Hartman (acting)

20th Director of the National Security Agency
- Incumbent
- Assumed office 16 March 2026
- President: Donald Trump
- Deputy: Tim Kosiba
- Preceded by: Timothy D. Haugh; William J. Hartman (acting)

Personal details
- Born: Joshua Monroe Rudd c. 1971 (age 54–55) California, U.S.
- Education: Furman University (BA); Naval War College (MA)
- Awards: Defense Superior Service Medal (3); Legion of Merit (3); Bronze Star Medal (3)

Military service
- Allegiance: United States
- Branch: United States Army
- Years of service: 1993–present
- Rank: General
- Commands: United States Cyber Command; National Security Agency; Central Security Service; Special Operations Command Pacific; Joint Task Force National Capital Region; Delta Force
- Battles/wars: War in Afghanistan; Iraq War; War against the Islamic State

Joshua Monroe "Josh" Rudd (born c. 1971) is an American general who has served as the director of the National Security Agency and commander of United States Cyber Command since March 2026. He previously served as deputy commander of the United States Indo-Pacific Command from September 2024. Before that he served as the chief of staff of the United States Indo-Pacific Command from 2022 to 2024 and commander of Special Operations Command Pacific from 2020 to 2022.

== Early life ==
Rudd was born in Southern California and raised in South Carolina. His home town is Fort Mill, South Carolina.

== Military career ==
Rudd graduated from Furman University with a Bachelor of Arts in Political Science in 1993 and earned his commission as a second lieutenant through ROTC. Rudd successfully completed Special Forces Assessment and Selection and later graduated from the Special Forces Qualification Course in 1999. Rudd completed numerous specialized courses including Army Ranger Course at Fort Benning, Military Free Fall Jumpmaster course in Yuma, Arizona, and Combat Diver Qualification Course at the Special Forces Underwater Operations School in Key West, Florida. Rudd has deployed in support of multiple combat operations including Operation Enduring Freedom and Operation Iraqi Freedom.

Rudd had two tours in Afghanistan with JSOC and six tours in Iraq. He became the commander of Delta Force in the summer of 2015.

Rudd has served in various command and staff assignments including Chief Current Operations Joint Special Operations Command, J3 Forward Deployed Combined Joint Special Operations Task Force, Director Forward Deployed Operations Intelligence Fusion Cell, Commander JIATF-NCR, Commander of a Forward Deployed Combined Joint Special Operations Task Force, Deputy Commanding General 25th Infantry Division, Deputy Commanding General 1st Special Forces Command, Commander Special Operations Command Pacific, and Chief of Staff of the United States Indo-Pacific Command.

Rudd holds a Master of Arts degree in national security and strategic studies from the Naval War College. He is a graduate of the Naval Command and Staff College, Infantry Officer Advanced Course and United States Army War College.

In September 2024, Rudd was nominated for promotion to lieutenant general and assignment as the deputy commander of the United States Indo-Pacific Command.

In December 2025, Rudd was nominated for promotion to general and assignment as the commander of United States Cyber Command and the director of the National Security Agency. On March 10, 2026, he was confirmed for the positions in a 71–29 vote by the Senate.

== Awards and decorations ==
Rudd's awards and decorations include:

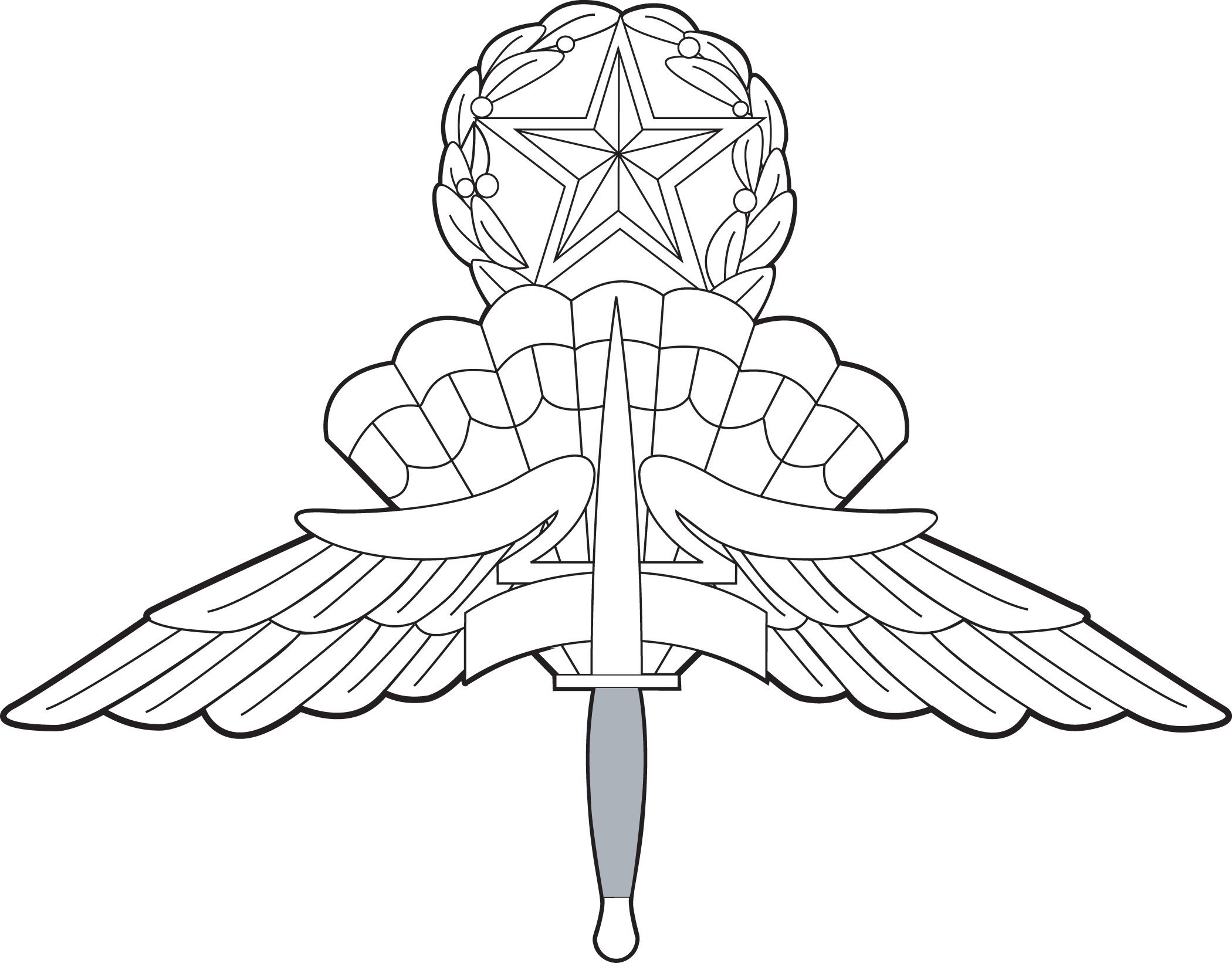
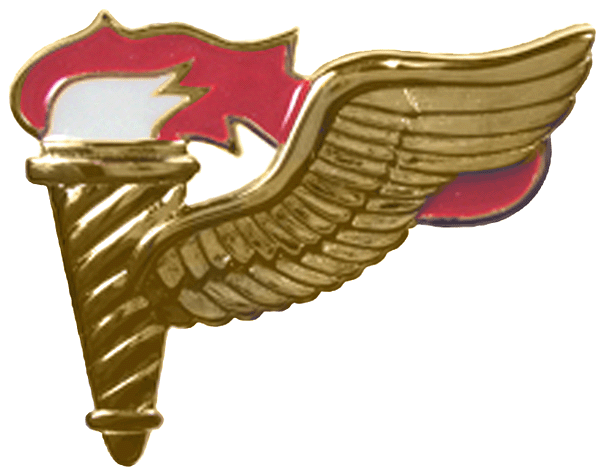
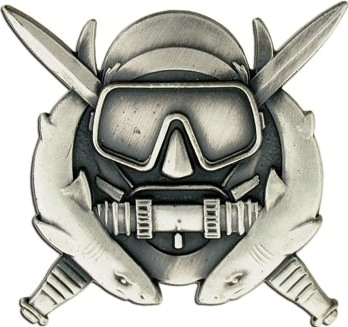

Combat Infantryman Badge
Defense Superior Service Medal with two oak leaf clusters		Legion of Merit with two oak leaf clusters
Bronze Star Medal with two oak leaf clusters	Defense Meritorious Service Medal with two oak leaf clusters	Meritorious Service Medal with oak leaf cluster
Army Commendation Medal	Joint Service Achievement Medal with oak leaf cluster	Army Achievement Medal with oak leaf cluster
National Defense Service Medal with star with Award numeral 3	Afghanistan Campaign Medal with two stars	Iraq Campaign Medal with four stars
Inherent Resolve Campaign Medal	Global War on Terrorism Expeditionary Medal	Global War on Terrorism Service Medal
Army Service Ribbon with star	Army Overseas Service with Award numeral "3"	NATO Medal; Non-Article 5
Joint Meritorious Unit Award	Valorous Unit Award	Meritorious Unit Award
Master Parachutist Badge
Master Military Freefall Parachutist Badge	Pathfinder Badge	Special Diver Badge
Special Forces Tab		Ranger Tab

== Dates of promotions ==
Rank	Branch	Date
Brigadier general	Army	2 July 2019
Major general	Army	3 February 2022
Lieutenant general	Army	25 September 2024
General	Army	20 March 2026

Military offices
Preceded by Jonathan P. Braga	Commander of Special Operations Command Pacific; 2020–2022	Succeeded by Jeromy B. Williams
Preceded by Stephen Sklenka	Deputy Commander of the United States Indo-Pacific Command; 2024–2026	Succeeded by
Preceded by William J. Hartman; Acting	Director of the National Security Agency and Commander of the United States Cyber Command; 2026–present	Incumbent
