= Lorna Mahlock =

United States Marine Corps general

Lorna M. Mahlock
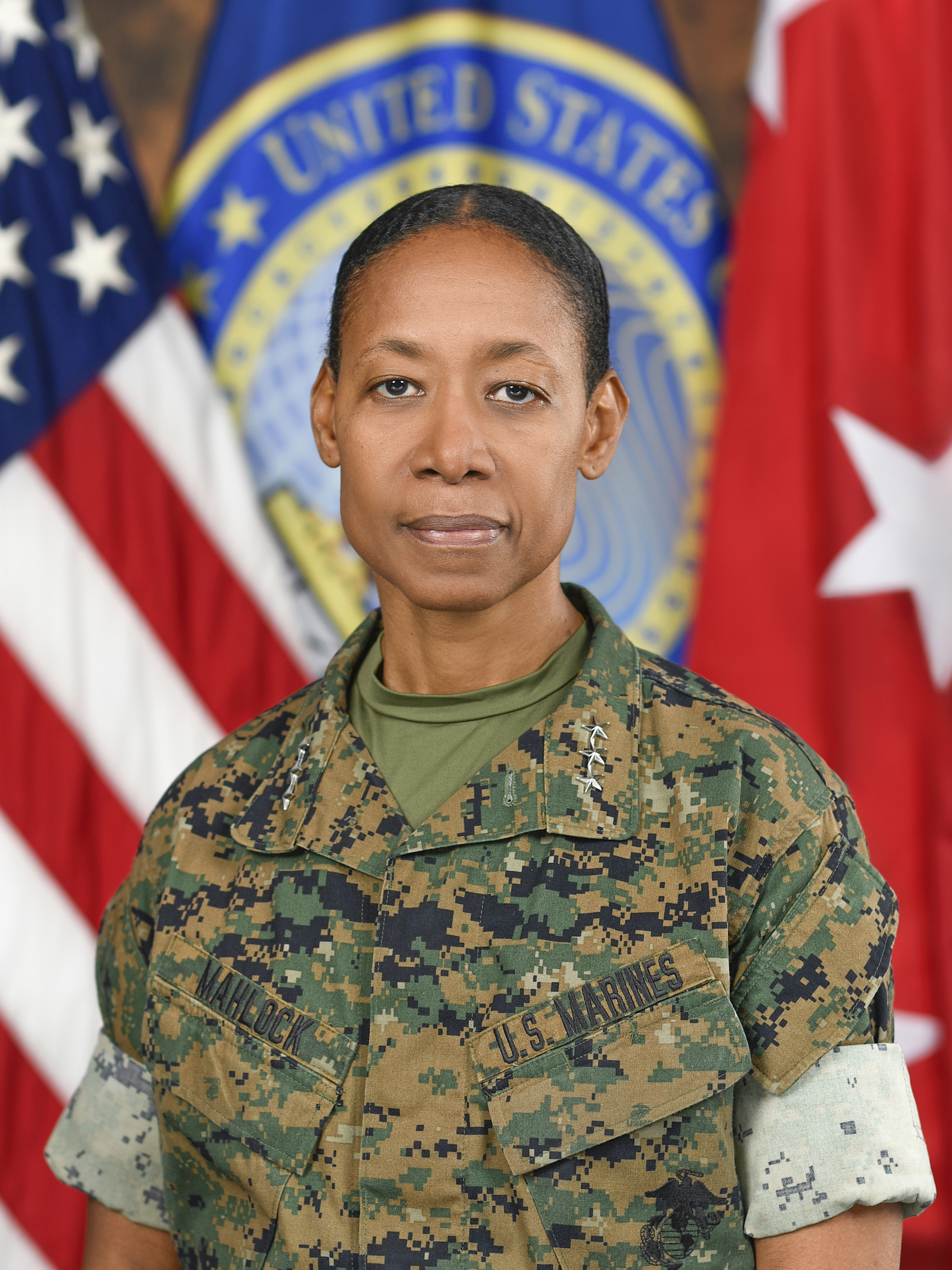
- Born: 1968 or 1969 (age 57–58); Kingston, Jamaica
- Military career
- Allegiance: United States
- Branch: United States Marine Corps
- Service years: 1985–present
- Rank: Lieutenant general
- Commands: Cyber National Mission Force; Marine Air Control Group 18; Marine Tactical Air Command Squadron 38
- Conflicts: Iraq War
- Awards: Legion of Merit (2); Defense Meritorious Service Medal; Meritorious Service Medal (4)

Lorna M. Mahlock (born 1968/1969) is a United States Marine Corps lieutenant general who has served as deputy commander of the United States Cyber Command since March 2026. She previously served as commander of the Cyber National Mission Force from January 5, 2024 to March 20, 2026. Nominated by President Trump In 2018, she became the first Black woman to be nominated for promotion to brigadier general in the United States Marine Corps. In December 2022, she became the first black female major general in the history of the Marine Corps.

== Early life and education ==
Born in Kingston, Jamaica, Mahlock immigrated to Brooklyn, New York and enlisted in the United States Marine Corps. She was selected for the Marine Corps Enlisted Commissioning Education Program, graduated from Marquette University and was commissioned in December 1991.

== Military career ==
Designated as an Air Traffic Control Officer, Mahlock earned certifications as a Federal Aviation Administration Tower Local Controller and a Marine Aviation Weapons and Tactics Instructor. She has commanded and led at various levels globally and in combat including but not limited to: Air Traffic Control Detachment Commander; Executive Officer 1st Stinger Battery; Director Marine Corps Instructional Management School; Air Control Officer G3 Future Operations 1st Marine Aircraft Wing; Company Commander Operation Southern Watch and Operation Iraqi Freedom 1; Operations and Executive Officer Operation Iraqi Freedom 2; Director Marine Air Command and Control System Experimental; Commanding Officer Iraqi Freedom 8; Information Management Officer; J3 Land Operations Lead and Division Executive Officer, Headquarters European Command; Marine Corps Office of Legislative Affairs and Assistant Chief of Staff G6.

In December 2022, she received her second star and became the first Black female Major General in the U.S. Marine Corps.

Mahlock holds a master's degree in Adult and Higher Education from the University of Oklahoma at Norman; a Master in National Security and Strategic Studies with distinction from the Naval War College, Newport, Rhode Island; a Master in Strategic Studies from the United States Army War College; and a Master Certificate in Information Operations from the Naval Postgraduate School. She is also a Higher Command and Staff Course graduate of the United Kingdom Joint Services Command and Staff College.

On December 15, 2025, she was nominated to be Deputy Commander of United States Cyber Command. Mahlock was confirmed by the Senate on January 30, 2026 as the first Black woman to be appointed as a lieutenant general in the United States Marine Corps.

== Awards ==
Her personal decorations include:

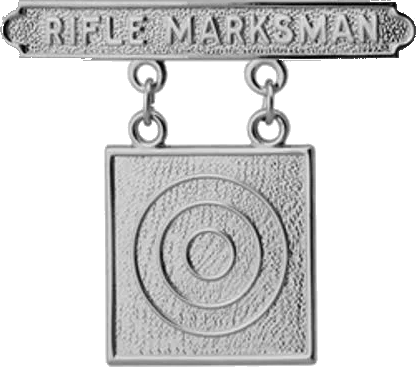

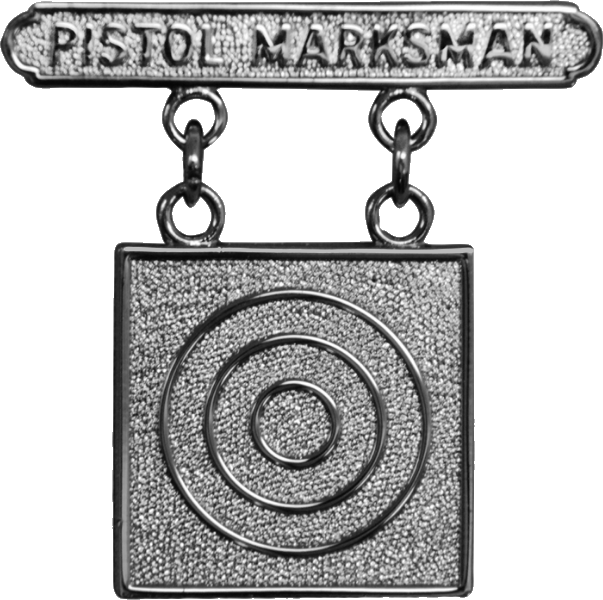

Legion of Merit with one gold award star	Defense Meritorious Service Medal	Meritorious Service Medal with three gold award stars	Joint Service Commendation Medal
Navy and Marine Corps Commendation Medal with two gold award stars	Joint Service Achievement Medal with one oak leaf cluster	Navy and Marine Corps Achievement Medal	United States Navy Presidential Unit Citation
Joint Meritorious Unit Award	Marine Corps Good Conduct Medal with one service star	National Defense Service Medal with one service star	Iraq Campaign Medal with one service star
Global War on Terrorism Expeditionary Medal	Global War on Terrorism Service Medal	Korea Defense Service Medal	Sea Service Deployment Ribbon with nine service stars
Marksman Rifle Badge		Marksman Pistol Badge	

Military offices
Preceded by Dennis Crall	Chief Information Officer of the United States Marine Corps; 2018–2021	Succeeded by Joseph Matos
New office	Deputy Director for Combat Support of the Cybersecurity Directorate of the National Security Agency; 2021–2024	Succeeded by Melvin G. Carter
Preceded by William J. Hartman	Commander of the Cyber National Mission Force; 2024–2026	Succeeded by Matthew J. Lennox
Preceded by William J. Hartman Acting	Deputy Commander of the United States Cyber Command; 2026–present	Incumbent
