= Thomas M. Henderschedt =

Thomas M. Henderschedt is a vice admiral in the United States Navy who is currently serving as the Director for Intelligence, Joint Staff.

== Early years and education ==
Thomas M. Henderschedt is a native of Allentown, Pennsylvania. He holds an International Affairs degree from George Washington University, and master's degrees from the Army Command and General Staff College and Johns Hopkins University School of Advanced International Studies (SAIS) (China Studies).

== Military career ==
While at SAIS, Vice Admiral Henderschedt was the Navy's 2012-2013 Samuel Eliot Morison Scholar. He examined the U.S.-PRC military to military relationship in the context of the Chinese political system.

Vice Admiral Henderschedt's initial tours were aboard USS Helena (SSN-725) and as an exchange officer in the Royal Navy assigned to Faslane, Scotland.

Following lateral transfer to special duty officer-intelligence, all follow-on tours were focused in the Indo-Pacific. Operational tours include Carrier Strike Group 3 and United States Seventh Fleet.

Ashore he served at the Joint Intelligence Center, United States Indo-Pacific Command; the Office of Naval Intelligence; and the Office of the Director of National Intelligence.

Overseas Vice Admiral Henderschedt served as the Navy liaison at the American Institute in Taiwan as well as three attaché tours in China: assistant naval attaché, naval attaché, and defense attaché in Beijing, People's Republic of China. Upon his final return from the PRC, Vice Admiral Henderschedt served as the Director of Intelligence (J2) U.S. Indo-Pacific Command followed by a tour at the Central Intelligence Agency, Washington, DC.

Henderschedt is currently serving as the Director for Intelligence, Joint Staff.

== Awards ==
Henderschedt is a recipient of the Rear Admiral Edwin Layton award for leadership in Naval Intelligence.
