= Central Security Service =

United States Department of Defense government agency

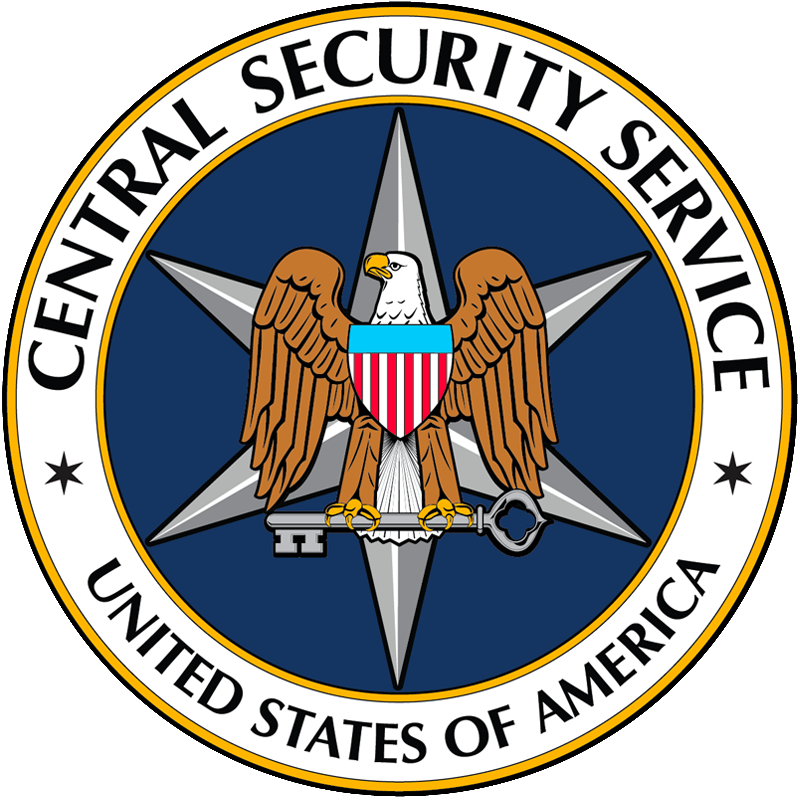
- Emblem of the Central Security Service

Agency overview
- Formed: 1972
- Headquarters: Fort Meade, Maryland, U.S.; 39°6′32″N 76°46′17″W
- Agency executives: GEN Joshua Rudd, USA, Chief, Central Security Service; Major General Matteo Martemucci, USAF, Deputy Chief, Central Security Service
- Website: Page on NSA.gov

The Central Security Service (CSS) is a combat support agency of the United States Department of Defense which was established in 1972 to integrate the National Security Agency (NSA) and the Service Cryptologic Components (SCC) of the United States Armed Forces in the field of signals intelligence, cryptology, and information assurance at the tactical level. In 2002, the CSS had approximately 25,000 uniformed members. It is part of the United States Intelligence Community.

== History ==
After World War II ended, the United States had two military organizations for the collection of signals intelligence (SIGINT): the Army Security Agency (ASA) and the Naval Communications Intelligence Organization (OP-20-G). The latter was deactivated and reorganized into the much smaller Communications Support Activities (CSA) in 1946, leaving ASA as the main SIGINT agency. Additionally, the United States Air Force established its own US Air Force Security Service (USAFSS) for the collection of communications intelligence in 1948.

On May 20, 1949, the secretary of defense created the Armed Forces Security Agency (AFSA), which became responsible for the direction and control of all US communications intelligence (COMINT) and communications security (COMSEC) activities. However, at the tactical level these tasks continued to be performed by the respective army, navy, and air force agencies, which were not willing to accept the authority of the newly created AFSA. In trying to get control over the military SIGINT elements, AFSA was replaced by the new and more powerful National Security Agency (NSA) on October 24, 1952.

Tactical military intelligence was traditionally collected by specialized soldiers, sailors, airmen, Marines, and coast guardsmen deployed around the world. For example, during the Vietnam War, each of the military services deployed its own cryptologic units, supported by the NSA, which set up a number of SIGINT Support Groups (SSGs) as merging points for signal intelligence. With increasing cryptologic requirements, the military SIGINT systems had to be updated and unified and therefore it was planned to integrate NSA and the Service Cryptologic Agencies (SCAs) into a new unified command, with NSA absorbing SCA functions.

According to James Bamford, NSA/CSS was initially conceived as a separate "fourth department" beside the three that make up the Department of Defense. The latter resisted this idea, and therefore the CSS was founded as an inter-service organization. The Central Security Service was established by presidential directive in February 1972 to promote full partnership between the NSA and the Service Cryptologic Elements (SCEs) of the armed forces.

The new NSA/CSS solution increased performance standards and training and was the foundation for further centralization of NSA and the various military cryptologic elements and capabilities.

== Structure ==
The chief of the Central Security Service (CH/CSS) is the director of the National Security Agency (DIRNSA), who also serves as Commander of the United States Cyber Command (USCYBERCOM), and is the highest-ranking military official of these organizations.

A function specific for the CSS is that of Deputy Chief CSS (DCH/CSS), who is the principal advisor on military cryptologic issues to the director of NSA in his role as Chief of CSS. The Deputy Chief oversees the military cryptology system and manages the partnerships between NSA/CSS and the Service Cryptologic Elements. He also ensures military capabilities to fulfill the National Cryptologic Strategy. The current Deputy Chief of the CSS is Brig. Gen. D. Scott George, USAF.

=== Current members ===
The Central Security Service comprises the following Service Cryptologic Components:

- U.S. Army Intelligence and Security Command (INSCOM, formerly U.S. Army Security Agency)
- Marine Cryptologic Support Battalion (MCSB)
- U.S. Fleet Cyber Command (formerly Naval Security Group)
- Sixteenth Air Force (formerly Twenty-Fifth Air Force, and Air Force Intelligence, Surveillance and Reconnaissance Agency)
- National Space Intelligence Center (NSIC)
- Coast Guard Intelligence (CGI)

These Service Cryptologic Components consist of a range of subordinate units for specific tasks, stationed both domestically and overseas. INSCOM has over 15 brigades, groups and centers with presence at over 180 locations worldwide; MCSB consists of seven companies, five of which are in the continental US, one in Hawaii and one in England; and AFISRA has five major wings and four supported ones with about 17,000 people at 65 locations worldwide.

== Tasks ==
For all SIGINT-related activities, these military intelligence and security organizations are part of the Central Security Service and therefore subordinate to the Director of NSA in his role as Chief of the CSS. For administrative matters and logistic support, these cryptologic organizations are part of their respective parent service of the United States Armed Forces. Other SIGINT-related units and resources from the military can be subordinated to the Chief of the CSS by the Secretary of Defense with the advice of the Joint Chiefs of Staff.

The day-to-day work of the CSS is to capture enemy signals (radar, telemetry, radio/satellite communications) using the means of the involved service. For example, the Navy has special submarines for tapping undersea cables; the Air Force operates aircraft with sophisticated antennas and processing gear to listen to enemy radar and radio; and on the ground, the Army operates similar eavesdropping equipment.

== Emblem ==
Pre-2022 Central Security Service seal

After its creation, the CSS had no emblem of its own for many years, so in 1996, a seal for the Central Security Service was created upon request of NSA Director Kenneth A. Minihan. The blue background of the CSS emblem represents "fidelity" and "steadfastness", with the symbols for the cryptologic service elements provided shown clockwise from top right as follows: Army Intelligence and Security Command, Marine Corps Intelligence, Naval Security Group, Coast Guard Intelligence and Air Force Intelligence, Surveillance and Reconnaissance Agency with the symbol of the NSA in the center.

The seal was updated in 2022 to display all six of the Service Cryptologic Components, which are the United States Fleet Cyber Command, the United States Marine Corps Director of Intelligence, the United States Army's Intelligence and Security Command, the 16th Air Force representing both United States Air Force and United States Space Force services, and the US Coast Guard Deputy Assistant Commandant for Intelligence. Each are equally balanced around a six point star on which is centered the symbol of NSA/CSS, who provides the funding, direction, and guidance to all of America's SIGINT activities.
