= Loretta Reynolds =

United States Marine Corps general

Loretta E. Reynolds
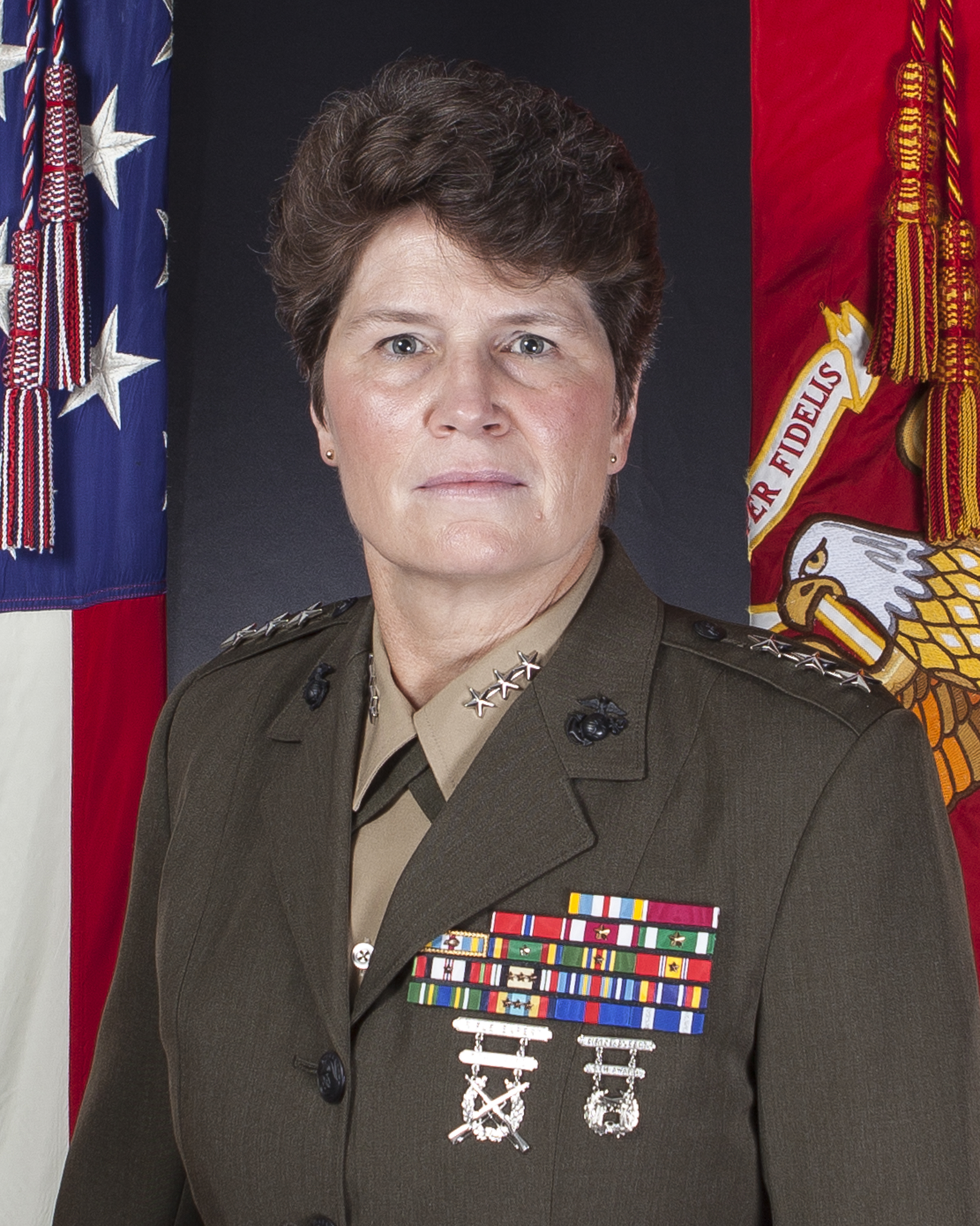
- Reynolds in July 2018
- Military career
- Allegiance: United States
- Branch: United States Marine Corps
- Service years: 1986–2021
- Rank: Lieutenant General
- Nickname: "Lori"
- Commands: Marine Corps Forces Strategic Command; Marine Corps Cyberspace Command; Marine Corps Recruit Depot Parris Island; 9th Communication Battalion
- Conflicts: Iraq War; War in Afghanistan
- Awards: Defense Superior Service Medal; Legion of Merit; Bronze Star Medal

Loretta Eleanor "Lori" Reynolds is a retired lieutenant general in the United States Marine Corps. She is the third woman to achieve that rank in the Marine Corps.

== Early life and education ==
Reynolds attended the Seton High School in Baltimore, Maryland, an all-girls Catholic school. She was commissioned into the United States Marine Corps in May 1986 as a recent graduate of the United States Naval Academy. She is a native of Baltimore, Maryland and now resides in Kentucky.

== Awards and decorations ==

Defense Superior Service Medal
| Legion of Merit | Bronze Star Medal | Meritorious Service Medal with one gold award star | Navy Commendation Medal with award star |
| Joint Meritorious Unit Award with one oak leaf cluster | U.S. Navy Unit Commendation with award star | Navy Meritorious Unit Commendation with award star | National Defense Service Medal with award star |
| Afghanistan Campaign Medal with three bronze service stars | Iraq Campaign Medal with one service star | Global War on Terrorism Service Medal | Global War on Terrorism Expeditionary Medal |
| Korea Defense Service Medal | Sea Service Deployment Ribbon with three service stars | Marine Corps Recruiting Service Ribbon | NATO Medal Non-Article 5 |
| Expert Rifle Badge | | Expert Pistol Badge | |

== Military career ==
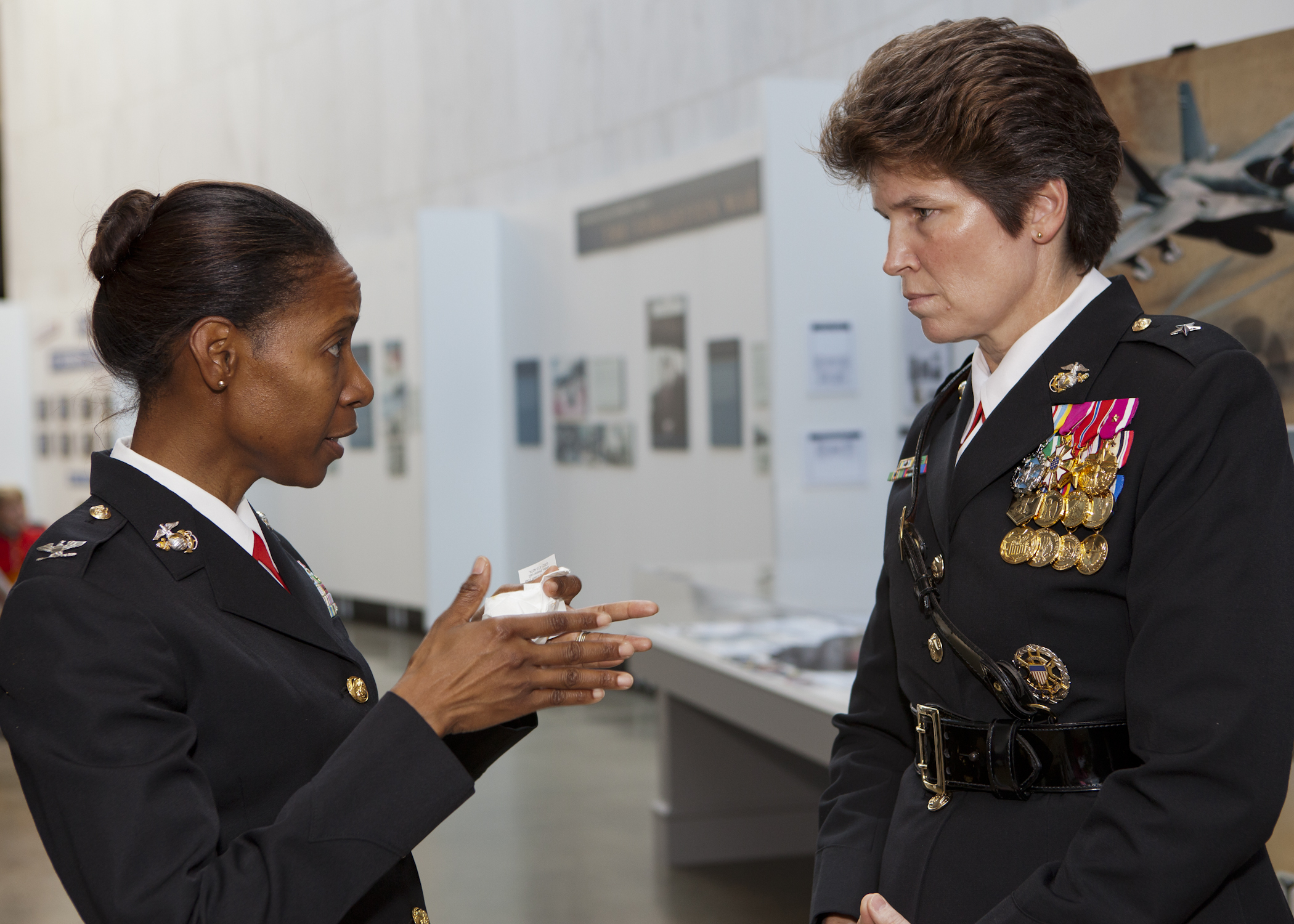
Reynolds talking to United States Marine Colonel Lorna Mahlock in June 2014.

=== 1990s ===
As a communications officer, Reynolds was initially assigned to Communications Company, Headquarters Battalion, 1st Marine Division, Camp Pendleton, California. She was later assigned to Marine Wing Communications Squadron 18, 1st Marine Aircraft Wing in Okinawa, Japan, where she was the Detachment Alpha Executive Officer and Commanding Officer. From September 1991 until June 1994, Reynolds was a Project Officer at the Marine Corps Systems Command.

From July 1994 to May 1995, Reynolds attended the Command and Control Systems Course at Marine Corps University and went on to serve as a Candidate Platoon Commander for Charlie Company, Officer Candidate School in Quantico. In September 1995, Reynolds returned to Camp Pendleton to serve with the Ninth Communication Battalion, 1st Surveillance, Reconnaissance, and Intelligence Group. While there, she served as Assistant Operations Officer and Commanding Officer, Bravo Company.

=== 2000s ===
From June 1997 to June 2000, Reynolds commanded the United States Marine Corps Recruiting Station in Harrisburg, Pennsylvania. From August 2000 until June 2001, she attended the Naval War College. Afterwards, Reynolds was assigned to Headquarters Marine Corps. There, she served as Action Officer and Deputy Division Head for Strategic Plans Division, Command, Control, Communications, and Computers Department from June 2001 to May 2003.

Reynolds assumed command of the 9th Communication Battalion on June 8, 2003. She deployed in support of Operation Iraqi Freedom to Fallujah, Iraq in February 2004 and returned to the United States in March 2005. During this deployment she was responsible for providing communications and IT support for I MEF. Reynolds later attended the United States Army War College and graduated in 2006. From 2006 to 2008 she served as a Desk Officer in Current Operations Division and as a Division Chief at the Joint Staff, J6 in Washington, D.C.

In March 2009, Reynolds assumed command of the I MEF Headquarters Group at Camp Pendleton. She deployed the Group to Camp Leatherneck in Afghanistan from March 2010 to March 2011, where the Group supported the efforts of I MEF FWD/Regional Command Southwest in Helmand Province.

=== 2010s ===
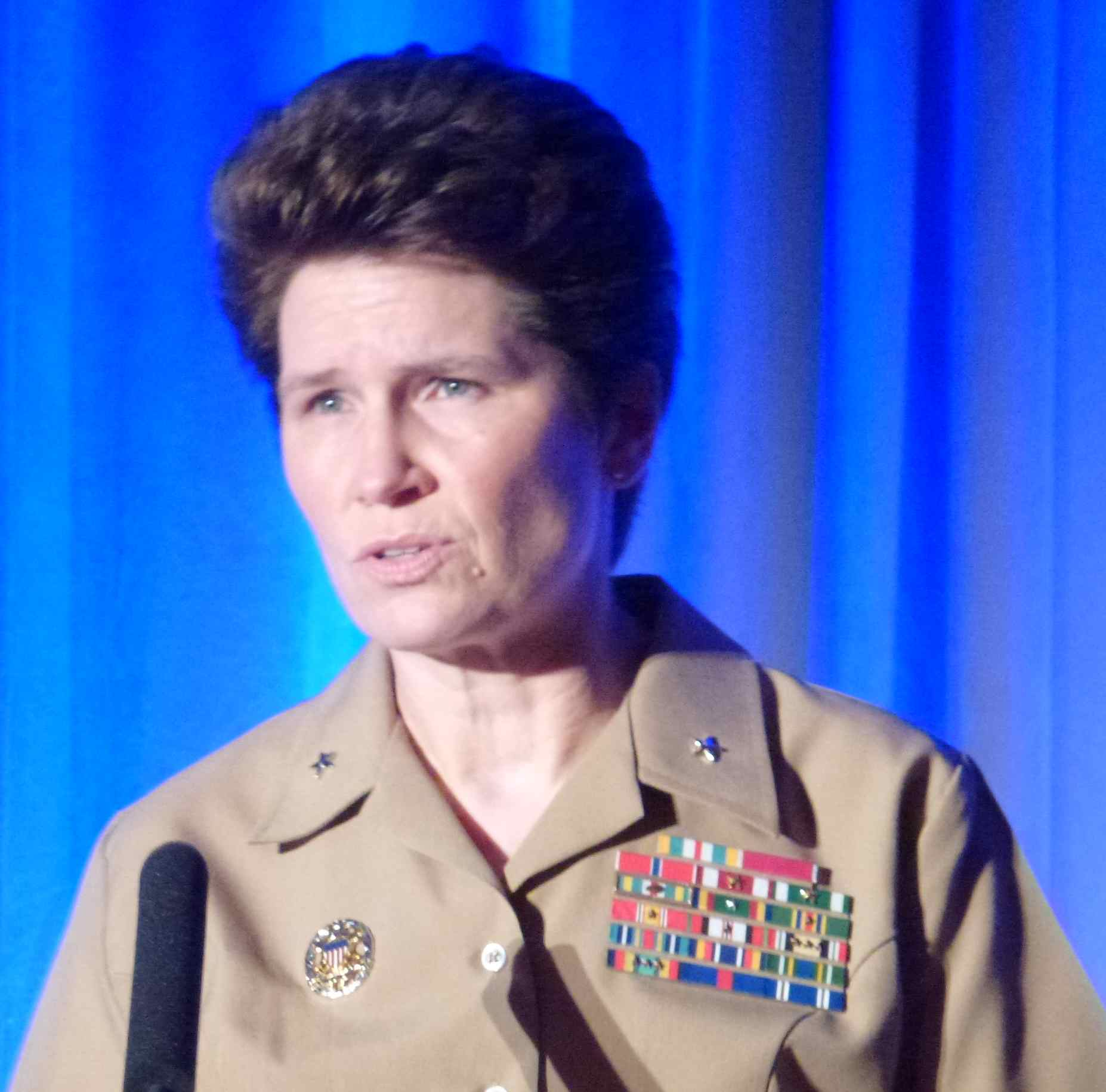
Reynolds orating before the Women's Basketball Coaches Association in April 2013

In 2011 Reynolds took charge of the Marine Corps Recruit Depot Parris Island. In September 2015, she assumed command of Marine Corps Cyberspace Command at Fort Meade, Maryland. In May 2018, Reynolds was nominated for promotion to lieutenant general, and assignment as deputy Marine Corps commandant for information and commander of Marine Corps Forces Strategic Command. She was promoted to lieutenant general by the Assistant Commandant of the Marine Corps in July 2018.

She handed the DCI/COMMARFORSTRAT mantle to Matthew Glavy in July 2021.

Military offices
| Preceded by Daniel J. O'Donohue | Commander of the Marine Corps Forces Cyberspace Command; 2015–2018 | Succeeded by Matthew Glavy |
| Preceded by Daniel J. O'Donohue | Deputy Commandant for Information of the United States Marine Corps; Commander of Marine Corps Forces Strategic Command; 2018–2021 | Succeeded by Matthew Glavy |
