= Joseph Matos =

U.S. Marine Corps general

Joseph A. Matos III
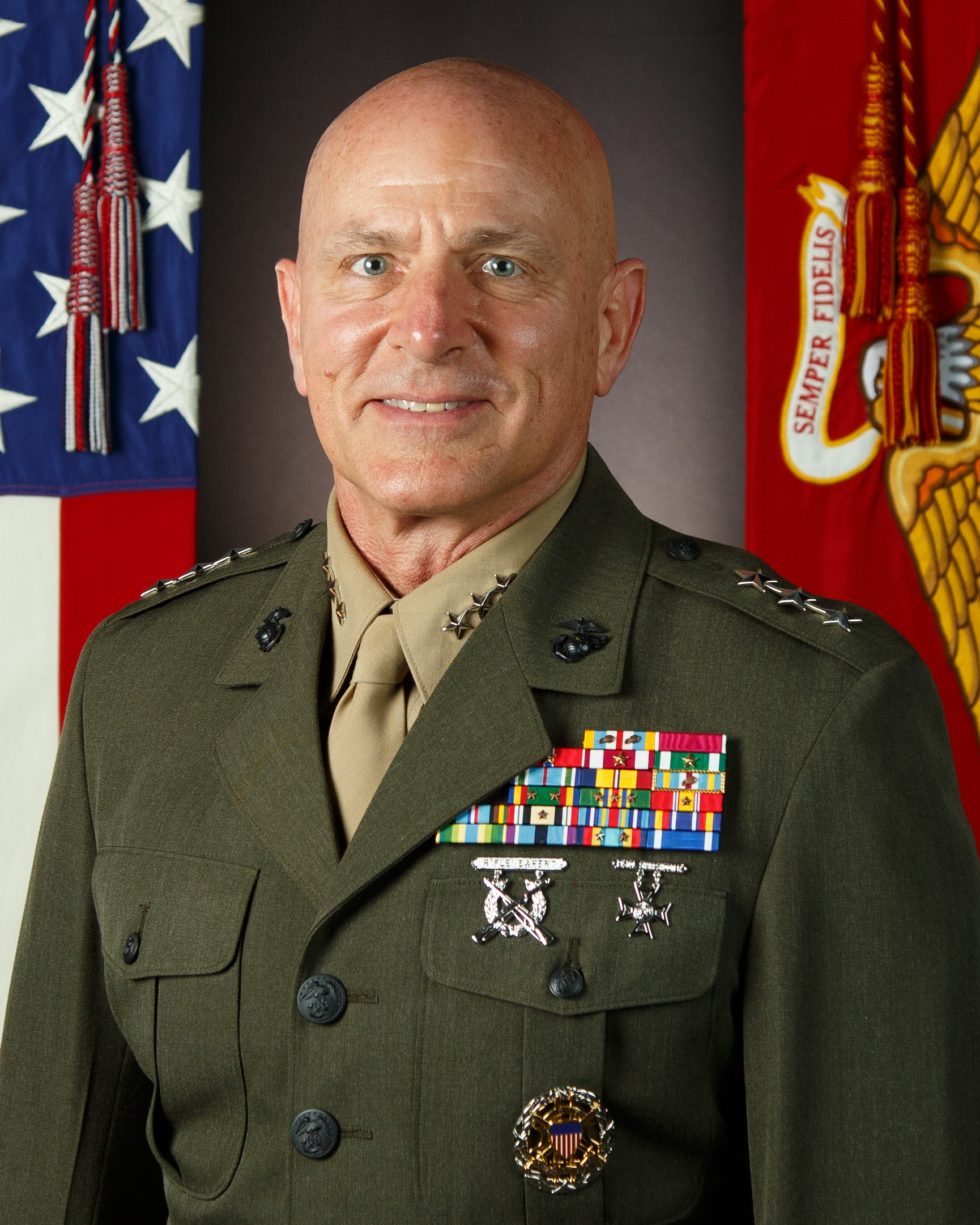
- Official portrait, 2026
- Born: Springfield, Virginia, U.S.
- Military career
- Allegiance: United States
- Branch: United States Marine Corps
- Rank: Lieutenant General
- Commands: Marine Corps Forces Strategic Command; Marine Corps Forces Cyberspace Command; Marine Corps Forces Space Command; Marine Corps Information Command; Defense Information Systems Agency Pacific

Joseph A. Matos III is a United States Marine Corps Lieutenant General who serves as the Deputy Commandant for Information of the USMC. He previously served as the Commander of Marine Corps Forces Cyberspace Command (MARFORCYBER), Marine Corps Forces Space Command, and Marine Corps Information Command, and as the Deputy Commander of MARFORCYBER and Joint Task Force-ARES.

Matos also served as the Director of Information, Command, Control, Communications, and Computers of the USMC and the Director of Command, Control Communications, Computers, and Cyber of the United States Space Command.

== Awards and decorations ==
His decorations and medals include:

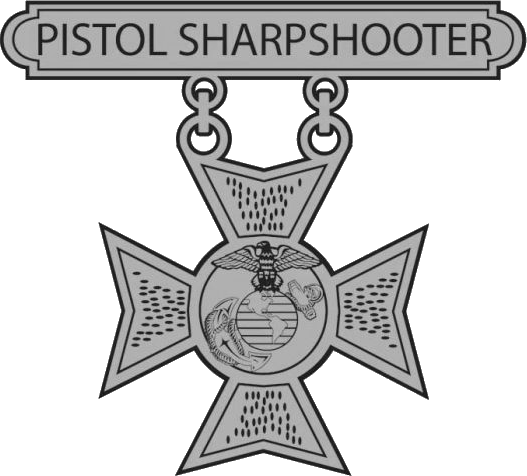

Defense Superior Service Medal with two bronze oak leaf clusters		Legion of Merit	Bronze Star medal with gold award star
Meritorious Service Medal with gold award star	Navy and Marine Corps Commendation Medal with gold award star	Joint Service Achievement Medal	Combat Action Ribbon
Joint Meritorious Unit Award with oak leaf cluster	U.S. Navy Unit Commendation with two bronze service stars	Navy Meritorious Unit Commendation with three service stars	National Defense Service Medal with service star
Armed Forces Expeditionary Medal	Global War on Terrorism Expeditionary Medal	Global War on Terrorism Service Medal	Iraq Campaign Medal with service star
Armed Forces Service Medal	Humanitarian Service Medal	Navy and Marine Corps Sea Service Deployment Ribbon with two service stars	NATO Medal for service with Yugoslavia
Rifle Expert Badge		Pistol Sharpshooter Badge	

Military offices
New office	Director of Command, Control Communications, Computers, and Cyber of the United States Space Command; 2019–2021	Succeeded by Richard Yu
Preceded by Lorna Mahlock	Director of Information, Command, Control, Communications, and Computers of the United States Marine Corps; 2021–2022	Succeeded by Matthew R. Simmons; Acting
Preceded by Ryan Heritage	Commander of Marine Corps Forces Cyberspace Command, Marine Corps Forces Space Command, and Marine Corps Information Command; 2024–present	Incumbent
