= Naval University System =

Higher education system of the U.S. Department of the Navy

- Abbreviation: NUS
- Formation: 2019
- Type: Military education
- Purpose: Higher Education
- Members: 8 institutions
- Parent organization: United States Department of the Navy

The Naval University System (NUS) is the higher education system of the United States Department of the Navy.

== History ==
In 2019, U.S. Navy secretary Richard V. Spencer signed a memorandum leading to the establishment of a Naval University System (NUS). NUS is the primary way that the United States Department of the Navy (DON) delivers education to its force, and it includes the DON's eight academic degree granting institutions. The NUS operates on a decentralized model to aimed at fostering greater agility, responsiveness, and innovation. In December 2019, acting secretary Thomas Modly signed a memorandum requesting funds for NUS.

=== Naval education task force ===
On February 24, 2022, Secretary Carlos Del Toro established the Naval Education task force to review the NUS. Its members include:

- Mark Hagerott, chancellor for the North Dakota University System (Task Force Chair)
- Walter E. Carter Jr., USN (Ret), president of Ohio State University
- Loretta Reynolds, USMC (Ret)
- Steffanie Easter, vice president of strategy and planning defense and civilian sector, Science Applications International Corporation
- Ronald L. Green, USMC (Ret)
- Lisette Nieves, president of the Fund for New York City
- Stefanie Sanford, chief of global policy and external relations, College Board

== Campuses ==
NUS campuses
Campus	Location	Established	Enrollment
Naval War College	Newport, Rhode Island	1884	599
Naval Postgraduate School	Monterey, California	1909	629
Marine Corps University	Quantico, Virginia	1989	491
United States Naval Academy	Annapolis, Maryland	1845	4,576
United States Naval Community College	Quantico, Virginia	2019	2,600
