= United States Marine Corps Forces Space Command =

- Active: 1 October 2020 – present
- Country: United States
- Branch: United States Marine Corps
- Part of: U.S. Space Command
- Garrison/HQ: Peterson Space Force Base, Colorado

Commanders
- Commander: BGen Ahmed T. Williamson

The U.S. Marine Corps Forces Space Command (abbreviated MARFORSPACE) is the Marine Corps service component of the United States Space Command. It is tasked with providing support to the Fleet Marine Force using space assets, including in communications, targeting, and navigation, to increase warfighter lethality.

== History ==
The command was activated on 1 October 2020. The commander of MARFORSPACE is dual-hatted as the commander of Marine Corps Forces Cyberspace Command, though the two organizations are separate commands with their own structure. Many members of MARFORSPACE were formerly part of Marine Corps Forces Strategic Command (MARFORSTRAT). The purpose of Marine Forces Space Command is to provide space operational support and capabilities to the Fleet Marine Force. The first Marine personnel of MARFORSPACE received training from the 1st Space Brigade of the United States Army Space and Missile Defense Command.

Although the Marine Corps does not operate any spacecraft, the Marines also use the capabilities of these systems, and previously relied on the Army's 1st Space Brigade for planning and coordinating space support capabilities during operations in Iraq. The Marine Corps had its own space operations officers that were part of Marine Corps Forces Strategic Command (MARFORSTRAT), who became part of MARFORSPACE upon its creation.

In October 2021, the headquarters of MARFORSPACE relocated from Offut Air Force Base in Nebraska to the Peterson Space Force Base in Colorado. The Marine Space Support Team also conducted its first deployments that year, in support of U.S. European Command and the 31st Marine Expeditionary Unit. In 2022, a new MOS, 1706 – Maritime Space Officer, was created, with specialized training for the space domain.

== List of commanders ==
No.	Commander		Term		
No.	Portrait	Name	Took office	Left office	Term length
1	Matthew Glavy	Major General; Matthew Glavy	1 October 2020	7 July 2021	279 days
2	Ryan P. Heritage	Major General; Ryan P. Heritage	7 July 2021	22 March 2024	2 years, 259 days
3	Joseph Matos	Major General; Joseph Matos	22 March 2024	18 June 2026	2 years, 88 days
4	Ahmed T. Williamson	Major General; Ahmed T. Williamson	18 June 2026	Incumbent	3 days
