= Matthew Glavy =

U.S. Marine Corps general

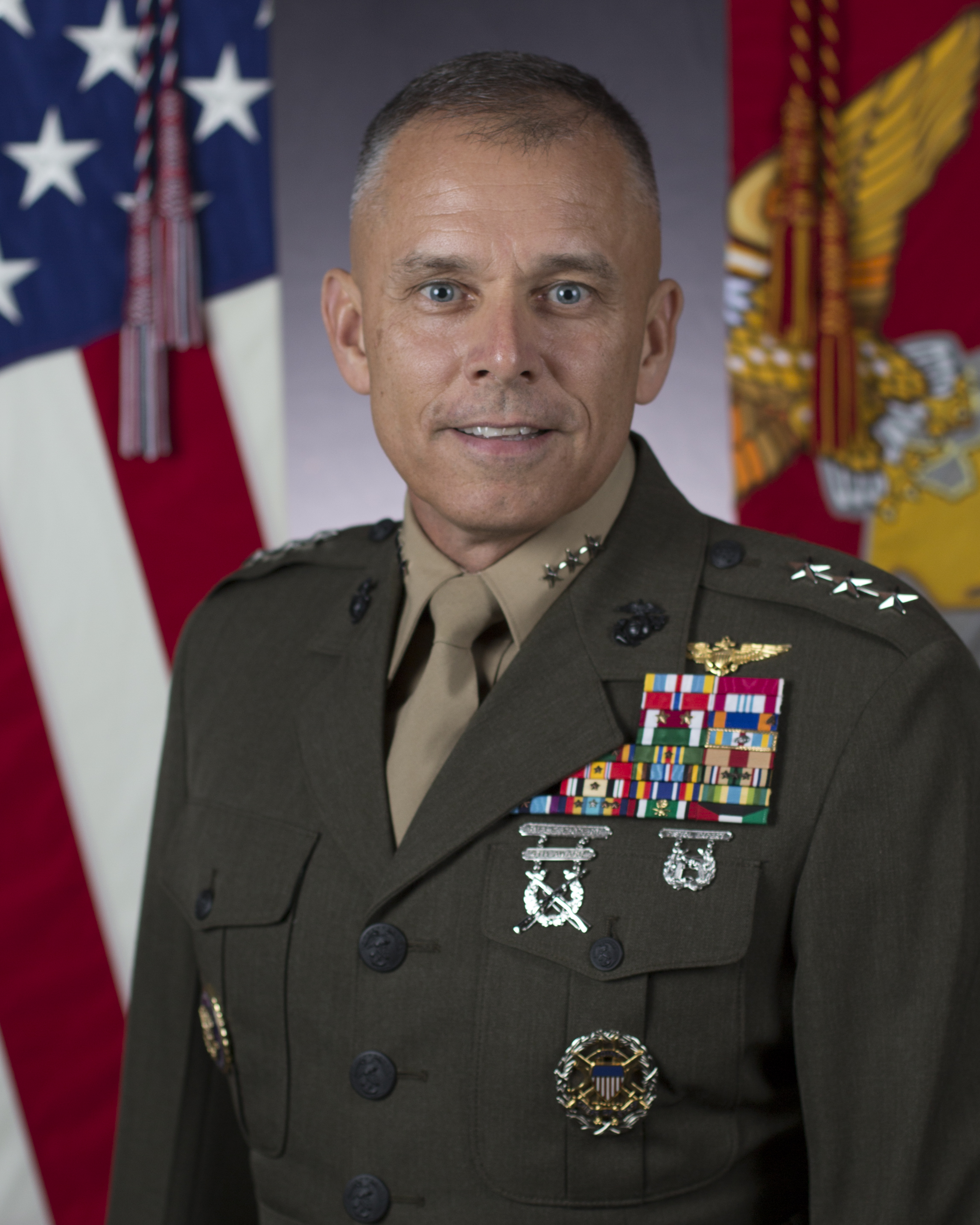
- Born: 1963 (age 62–63)
- Military career
- Allegiance: United States
- Branch: United States Marine Corps
- Service years: 1986–2024
- Rank: Lieutenant General
- Nickname: Skirt
- Commands: U.S. Marine Corps Forces Strategic Command; Marine Corps Forces Cyberspace Command; 2nd Marine Aircraft Wing; VMM-265

Matthew G. Glavy is a retired United States Marine Corps lieutenant general who last served as the Deputy Commandant for Information and commander of the Marine Corps Forces Strategic Command from 2021 to 2024. He assumed the additional duty of Director of Marine Corps Intelligence in June 2023. He previously served as commander of the Marine Corps Forces Cyberspace Command from 2018 to 2021 and the first commander of Marine Corps Forces Space Command from 2020 to 2021. Previously, he was the Commander of the 2nd Marine Aircraft Wing.

Military offices
Preceded by Gary L. Thomas	Commander of the 2nd Marine Aircraft Wing; 2016–2018	Succeeded by Karsten Heckl
Preceded by Loretta Reynolds	Commander of the Marine Corps Forces Cyberspace Command; 2018–2021	Succeeded by Ryan P. Heritage
New office	Commander of the Marine Corps Forces Space Command; 2020–2021	Succeeded by Ryan P. Heritage
Preceded by Loretta Reynolds	Deputy Commandant for Information of the United States Marine Corps; Commander of Marine Corps Forces Strategic Command; 2021–2024	Succeeded by Melvin G. Carter
