= Ryan Heritage =

U.S. Marine Corps general

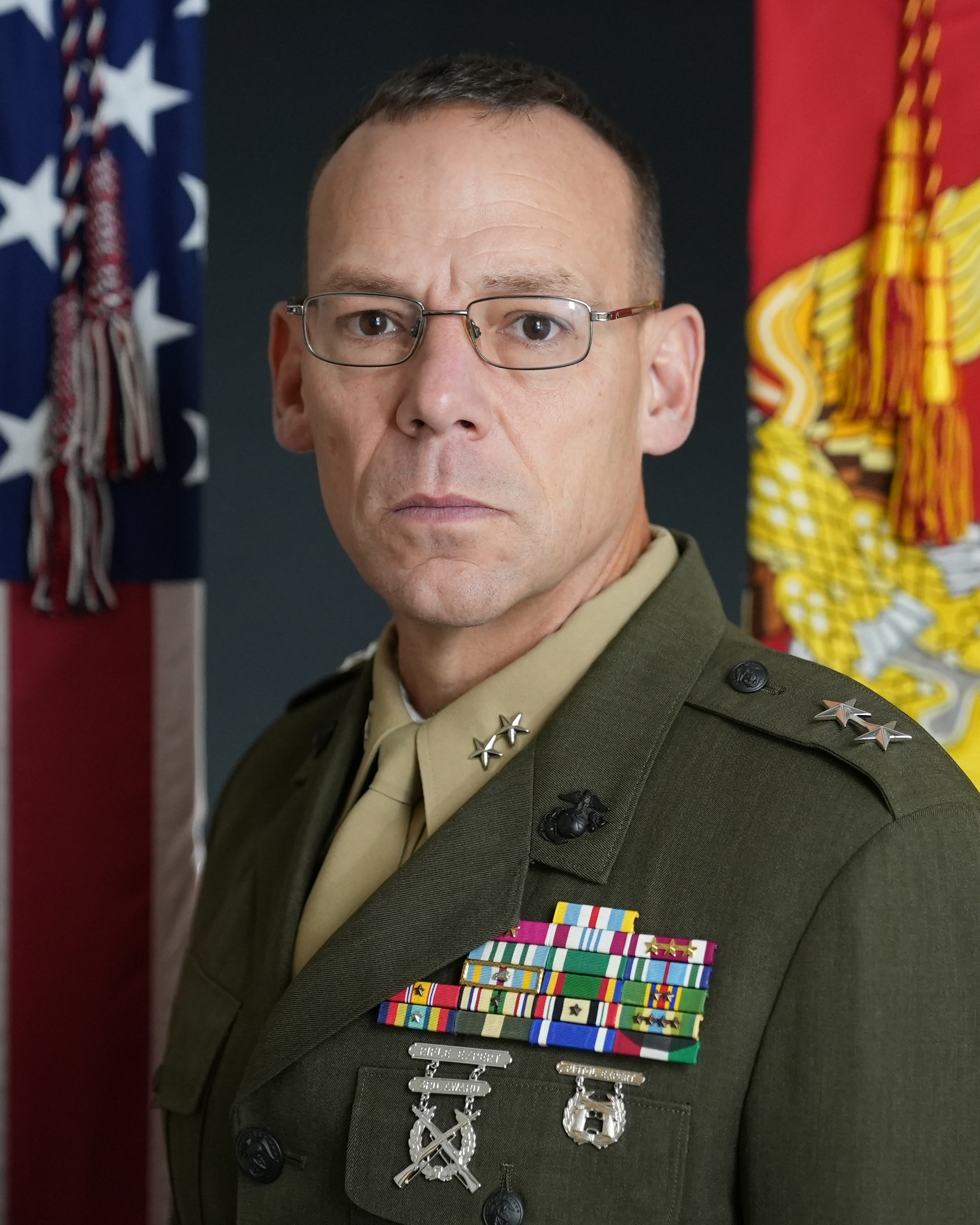
- Official portrait, 2021
- Military career
- Allegiance: United States
- Branch: United States Marine Corps
- Service years: 1990–2025
- Rank: Major General
- Commands: Marine Corps Forces Cyberspace Command; Marine Corps Forces Space Command; Marine Corps Information Command; Marine Corps Recruit Depot San Diego

Ryan P. Heritage is a retired United States Marine Corps major general who serves as the director of operations of the United States Cyber Command. He previously served as the commander of the Marine Corps Forces Cyberspace Command and Marine Corps Forces Space Command, and Marine Corps Information Command.

Heritage earned a bachelor's degree in international relations from George Washington University in 1990. He later received a master's degree in military studies from the Marine Corps Command and Staff College at Marine Corps University and a second master's degree in national security and strategic studies from the Army War College.

== Military career ==
Heritage served as the commander of Marine Corps Recruit Depot San Diego from 2018 to 2021.

In March 2023, Heritage was nominated for promotion to lieutenant general and assignment as deputy commandant for information of the Marine Corps. His nomination was confirmed on December 5, 2023, after being delayed by a hold by Senator Tommy Tuberville. After relinquishing command of Marine Corps Forces Cyberspace Command, Marine Corps Forces Space Command, and Marine Corps Information Command in 2024, he was assigned as director of operations of the United States Cyber Command. He would no longer serve as deputy commandant for information, an appointment he was already confirmed by the Senate.

Military offices
Preceded by William Jurney	Commanding General of Marine Corps Recruit Depot San Diego; 2018–2021	Succeeded by Jason L. Morris
Preceded by Matthew Glavy	Commander of the Marine Corps Forces Cyberspace Command and Marine Corps Forces Space Command; 2021–2024	Succeeded by Joseph Matos
New command	Commander of the Marine Corps Information Command; 2022–2024	Succeeded by Joseph Matos
Preceded by Ryan M. Janovic	Director of Operations of the United States Cyber Command; 2024–present	Incumbent
