= United States Naval Community College =

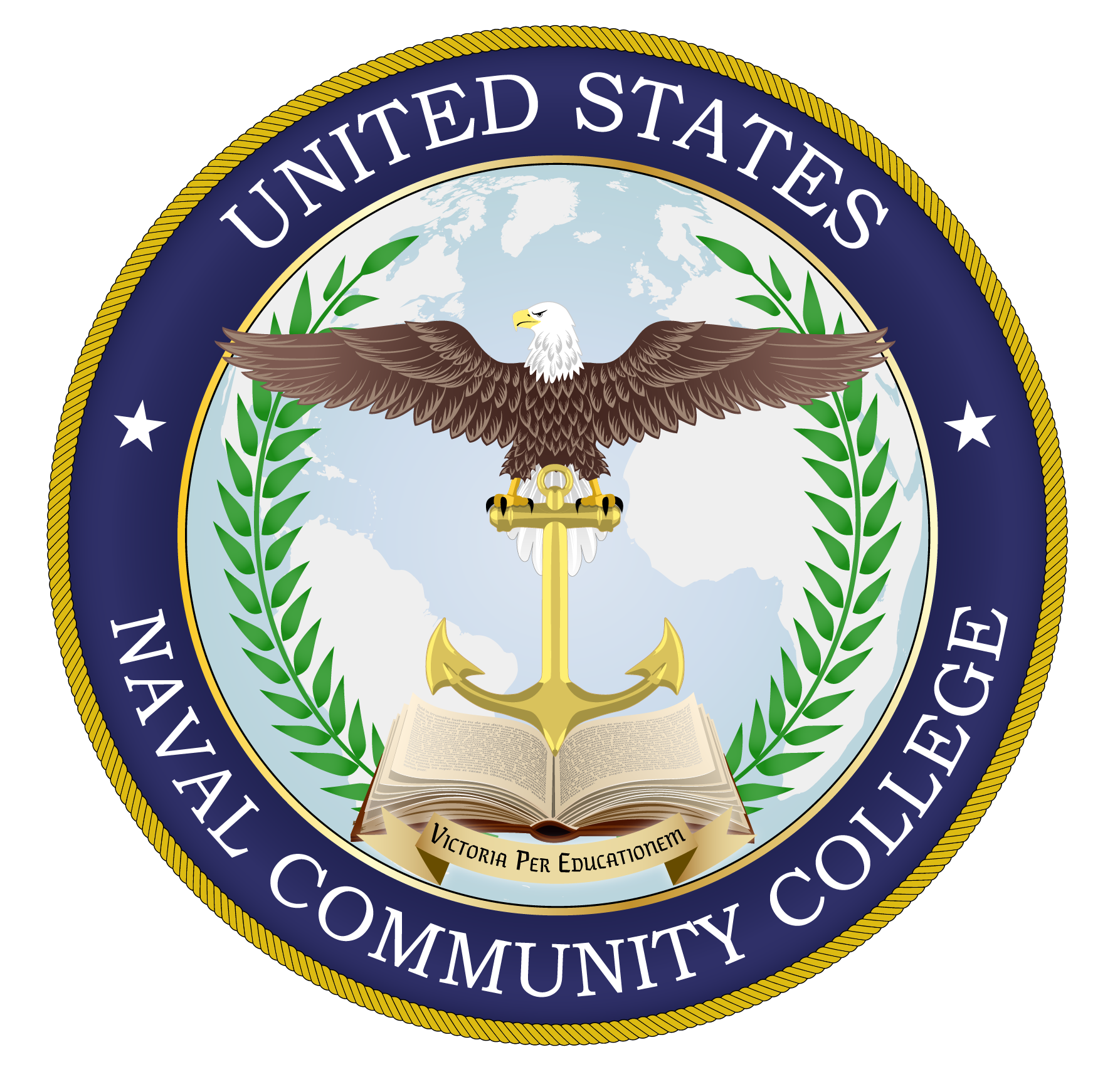
- Motto: Victoria per Educationem
- Type: Federal staff and community college
- Established: February 5, 2019
- Parent institution: Naval University System
- President: Randi Reich Cosentino
- Students: 3,000 (all undergraduate)(Fall 2023)
- Undergraduates: 3,000
- Location: Quantico, Virginia, United States
- Campus: Online
- Colors: Dark blue, Marine red, and gold
- Website: usncc.edu

The United States Naval Community College (USNCC) is a federal online staff and community college that grants two-year associate degrees and undergraduate professional diplomas and certificates to active-duty enlisted service members in the United States Navy and United States Marine Corps, and to active-duty and reserve enlisted members of the United States Coast Guard. It is the official community college of the U.S. Navy, Marine Corps, and Coast Guard.

It was founded in 2019 and began enrolling students in 2021. USNCC reached Initial Operating Capability (IOC) in 2023.

USNCC is pursuing accreditation candidate status through the Middle States Commission on Higher Education (MSCHE).

== History ==
The United States Community Naval Community College (USNCC) is the official community college for the Navy, Marine Corps, and Coast Guard. USNCC was formally founded on February 5, 2019, when the Secretary of the Navy (SECNAV), Richard V. Spencer, announced his intention (via a directive memorandum) to establish the USNCC as part of the broader Naval Education Enterprise and Naval University System. The SECNAV's directive stemmed from a broader set of recommendations featured in the 2018 Education for Seapower Study. A critical finding from this study highlighted how the character of warfare is changing rapidly, and the intellectual and cognitive development of naval leaders at all ranks is essential to preparedness for modern naval operations. An additional finding from this study highlighted how the largest portion of the naval workforce – enlisted service members – did not have education opportunities that are aligned to the needs of the Naval Services. Therefore, as a call to action, USNCC was established in May 2020 as a pilot program to offer naval-relevant education to enlisted service members.

In January 2021, USNCC began Pilot I, which was a series of two courses offered through five participating institutions. This initial Pilot was designed to provide an opportunity for the USNCC to collect data to evaluate and assess program design, institutional partnerships, student outcomes, and impact for service readiness. Approximately 550 hundred students enrolled during the initial pilot. In June 2021, USNCC offered continuing students the opportunity to “bridge” the gap between Pilot I and Pilot II (began in Fall 2021), until the USNCC reached its initial operating capability in 2023.

In December 2021, the U.S. Congress passed the National Defense Authorization Act for Fiscal Year 2022, which empowered USNCC with conditional degree-granting authority, the ability to directly hire staff and faculty in support of its educational mission, and to pursue candidacy status and accreditation through the United States Department of Education and Middle States Commission on Higher Education. In the fall of 2023, USNCC reached its IOC, with 2,600 students. In 2020, Randi Reich Cosentino was selected by acting secretary Thomas Modly as its first president. She reports to the Department of the Navy's chief learning officer. Robert Kozloski is her chief of staff.

== Academics ==
USNCC offer's associate degree in eight fields including cybersecurity and nuclear engineering. Coursework is delivered online and asynchronously. Each of its programs has a guaranteed two-plus-two pathway with four-year institutions including Arizona State University, University of Maryland Global Campus, Western Governors University, Alexandria Technical & Community College and Embry–Riddle Aeronautical University.

=== Degree Programs ===
Associate of Science in Aviation Maintenance (Embry-Riddle Aeronautical University)

Associate of Applied Science in Cybersecurity (Northern Virginia Community College)

Associate of Science in Cybersecurity and Information Assurance (Western Governors University)

Associate of Science in Data Analytics (Western Governors University)

Associate of Arts in General Studies with Computer Studies Specialization (University of Maryland Global Campus)

Associate of Science in Logistics (Maritime) (Arizona State University)

Associate of Arts in Military Studies (Arizona State University)

Associate of Science in Nuclear Engineering Technology (Alexandria Technical and Community College)

Associate of Science in General Engineering (Alexandria Technical & Community College)

Associate of Applied Science in General Engineering Technology (Alexandria Technical & Community College)

Associate of Arts in Organizational Leadership (Arizona State)

Associate of Applied Science in Technical Studies (Logistics) (Tidewater Community College)

Associate of Science in Uncrewed Systems (Embry-Riddle Aeronautical University)

=== Certificate and Diploma Programs ===
Fundamentals of Nuclear Engineering Undergraduate Diploma (Alexandria Technical and Community College)

Naval Studies Certificate

== Admissions ==
Prospective students must be:

- Active-duty enlisted service members in the United States Navy and United States Marine Corps, or active-duty and reserve enlisted members of the United States Coast Guard
- In good standing
- Not within 3 months of separation from service prior to their first academic term
