= Center for Advanced Operational Culture Learning =

The Center for Advanced Operational Culture Learning (CAOCL) was the Marine Corps' center of excellence for operational culture and language familiarization from 2006 to 2020. CAOCL was responsible for providing education, training, and learning resources for Marines across multiple learning domains including language, regional knowledge, culture specific knowledge, and culture general concepts and skills to improve their effectiveness across the full range of military operations. CAOCL also ensured the institutionalization of language, regional expertise, and culture (LREC) considerations in doctrine and policy. In addition to its LREC mission, CAOCL housed the Translational Research Group, a multidisciplinary team of social scientists who supported CAOCL's curriculum development, led its assessment platform, and conducted research on a wide range of issues related to Marines and Marine Corps organizations.

In June 2020, the Marine Corps closed CAOCL, some of its functions, including its career-length distance education program, transitioned to the Center for Regional and Security Studies at Marine Corps University.
