= Daniel J. O'Donohue =

U.S. Marine major general

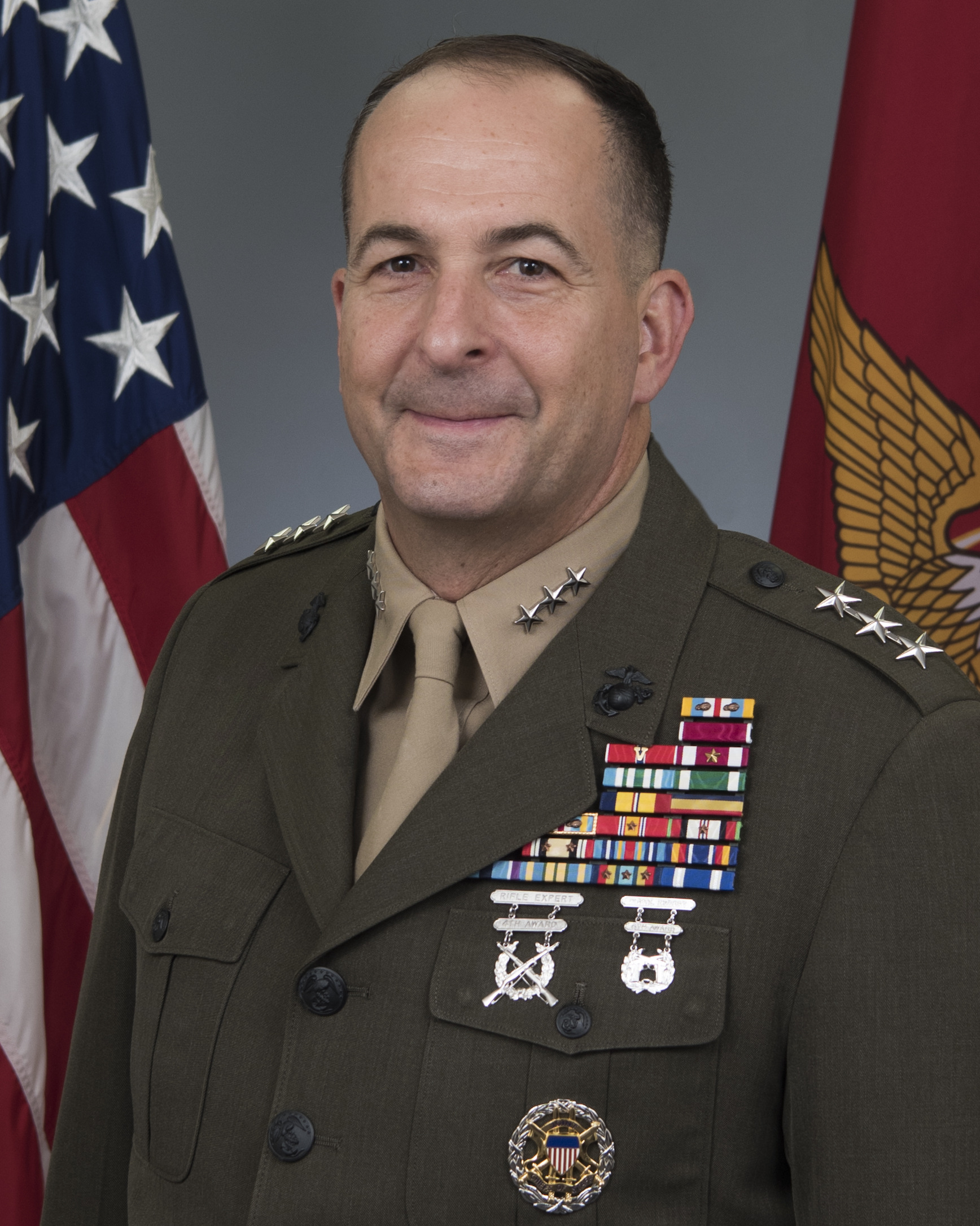
- O'Donohue in uniform, 2018
- Military career
- Allegiance: United States of America
- Branch: United States Marine Corps
- Service years: 1984-2020
- Rank: Lieutenant General
- Commands: 1st Marine Division; 1st Marine Regiment
- Awards: Defense Superior Service Medal (3); Legion of Merit

Daniel J. O'Donohue is a retired U.S. Marine lieutenant general. O'Donohue previously served as commanding general of 1st Marine Division and commanding officer of 1st Marine Regiment.

== Marine Corps career ==
O'Donohue graduated from the College of William and Mary and was commissioned in 1984 as a second lieutenant. He graduated from The Basic School at Marine Corps Base Quantico and served as platoon leader in the 1st Marine Division.

His staff and command assignments include:

- student, Amphibious Warfare School;
- student, Naval Postgraduate School, Ground Structure Planner, Headquarters Marine Corps (1988-1992);
- Company Commanding Officer with 1st Battalion, 2nd Marines (1993-1995);
- Operations Officer, 8th Marine Regiment (1995-1996);
- Operations Officer, Joint Task Force Assured Response and Special Purpose Marine Air-Ground Task Force Liberia (1996);
- Tactics Instructor and Program Director, Amphibious Warfare School (1997-2000);
- Operations Officer, 1st Marine Division (2001-2002);
- student, School of Advanced Warfighting;
- Commanding Officer, 2nd Battalion, 5th Marines (2002-2004);
- Assistant Chief of Staff G-7 / Division Combat Assessment Officer (2004);
- Deputy Branch Head, Secretary of the Defense's Office of Force Transformation (2005-2007);
- Branch Head, Ground Combat Element Branch, Plans, Policies and Operations, Headquarters Marine Corps (2007-2008);
- Assistant Chief of Staff G-3, 1st Marine Division (2008-2009);
- Commanding Officer, 1st Marine Regiment (2009-2010);
- student, National War College;
- Director, Capabilities Development Directorate, Headquarters Marine Corps (2010-2012);
- Deputy Director for Force Management, Joint Staff J-8 (2013), Deputy Chief of Staff for Operations, ISAF Joint Command (2014);
- Commanding General of Marine Corps Forces Cyberspace Command (2015);
- Commanding General, 1st Marine Division (2015-2017);
- Deputy Commandant, Information, Headquarters Marine Corps (2017-2018)
- and Director for Joint Force Development, Joint Staff J-7.

== Awards and decorations ==
U.S. military decorations
Defense Superior Service Medal with two bronze oak leaf clusters
Legion of Merit
Bronze Star Medal with Combat Distinguishing Device
Meritorious Service Medal with one gold award star
Joint Service Commendation Medal
Navy and Marine Corps Commendation Medal
Combat Action Ribbon
U.S. Unit Awards
Navy Presidential Unit Citation
Joint Meritorious Unit Award with two oak leaf clusters
U.S. Service (Campaign) Medals and Service and Training Ribbons
National Defense Service Medal with one bronze service star
Afghanistan Campaign Medal with service star
Iraq Campaign Medal with two service stars
Global War on Terrorism Expeditionary Medal
Global War on Terrorism Service Medal
Humanitarian Service Medal
Military Outstanding Volunteer Service Medal
Sea Service Deployment Ribbon with three service stars
NATO Medal for service with ISAF

U.S. badges, patches and tabs
Rifle Expert Badge
Pistol Expert Badge
Office of the Joint Chiefs of Staff Identification Badge

Military offices
Preceded by Thomas D. Waldhauser	Director for Joint Force Development of the Joint Staff; 2018–2020	Succeeded by Stuart B. Munsch
