= Marine Corps Forces Cyberspace Command =

Cyberwarfare and defense command of the U.S. Marine Corps

MARFORCYBER
- Emblem of MARFORCYBER
- Active: January 21, 2010 – present
- Country: United States of America
- Branch: United States Marine Corps
- Role: Cyber operations
- Part of: USCYBERCOM; U.S. Space Command
- Garrison/HQ: Fort Meade, Maryland, U.S.
- Nickname: "MARFORCYBER"
- Motto: Semper in proelio
- Website: www.marforcyber.marines.mil

Commanders
- Commander: BGen Ahmed T. Williamson
- Executive Director: SES Russell Meade
- Sergeant Major: SgtMaj Fort Taylor III
- Cyber Technology Officer: Shery S. Thomas
- Notable commanders: LtGen George J. Flynn; MajGen Loretta E. Reynolds

The U.S. Marine Corps Forces Cyberspace Command (MARFORCYBER) is a functional formation of the United States Marine Corps to protect critical infrastructure from cyberattack. MARFORCYBER is the Marine Corps' Service Cyber Component to United States Cyber Command (USCYBERCOM). It comprises a command element, the Marine Corps Cyber Operations Group, and the Marine Corps Cyber Warfare Group, a total of approximately 800 personnel. MARFORCYBER was established on January 21, 2010 under the command of Lieutenant General (LtGen) George J. Flynn,. As of 18 June 2026, Brigadier General Ahmed T. Williamson is in command. The headquarters of MARFORCYBER, which is located at Fort George G. Meade in Maryland, is named Lasswell Hall in honor of Colonel Alva B. Lasswell.

== Overview ==
The Secretary of Defense recognized the significance of the cyberspace domain to national security, and directed the establishment of USCYBERCOM as a sub-unified command under United States Strategic Command (USSTRATCOM). USCYBERCOM's primary objective is to integrate the cyberspace operations capabilities of the services and agencies in support of the National Strategy to Secure Cyberspace (NSSC).

In response, the USMC established MARFORCYBER in October 2009 (this was complemented by the standing up of the U.S. Fleet Cyber Command (FLTCYBER), U.S. Army Cyber Command (ARCYBER), and Air Forces Cyber (AFCYBER). MARFORCYBER's mission, in addition to its standard service component responsibilities, is to: plan, coordinate, integrate, synchronize, and direct the Corps' full spectrum of cyberspace operations. This includes Department of Defense (DoD) Information Network (DoDIN) operations, Defensive Cyber Operations (DCO), and planning and, when required, executing Offensive Cyberspace Operations (OCO). These operations support MAGTF, Joint and combined cyberspace requirements that enable freedom of action across all warfighting domains and deny the same to adversarial forces.

== Subordinate Units ==
=== Marine Corps Cyberspace Operations Group ===
MCCOG directs global Network Operations (NETOPS) and computer network defense of the Marine Corps Enterprise Network (MCEN) and to provide technical leadership in support of Marine and joint forces operating worldwide. The MCCOG is also responsible for intelligence gathering and analysis to develop future capabilities planning in accordance with DCO.

The MCCOG is the Computer Network Defense Service Provider (CNDSP) and serves as the Corps' Global Network Operations and Security Center (GNOSC). The MCCOG provides 24/7 NETOPS C2 through its Operations Center. Under the OPCON (operational command) of MARFORCYBER, the MCCOG executes Information NETOPS and DCO in support of operational requirements in order to enhance freedom of action across all warfighting domains, while denying the efforts of adversaries to degrade or disrupt this advantage through cyberspace.

Key MCCOG tasks include:

- operating and defending the MCEN
- collecting and sharing DoDIN Situational Awareness
- reporting and directing actions that proactively address threats and vulnerabilities
- responding to operational incidents
- providing technical leadership to ensure that our Corps and joint capabilities leverage new technologies to the advantage of the Marine warfighter

=== Marine Corps Cyber Warfare Group ===
MCCYWG is an administrative headquarters that organizes, trains, equips, provides administrative support, manages readiness of assigned forces, and recommends certification and presentation of Cyber Mission Force (CMF) Teams to USCYBERCOM.

Key MCCYWG tasks include:

- Conduct personnel management to organize and assign individuals to work roles and place them in work centers to ensure operational readiness of CMF Teams
- Ensure all personnel are trained in accordance with USCYBERCOM Joint Cyberspace Training and Certification Standards and equipped to perform all duties and tasks outlined in the MARFORCYBER Mission Essential Task List (METL)
- Advise COMMARFORCYBER on force employment considerations
- Provide subject matter expertise for operational planning requirements

=== Marine Corps Information Command ===
The Marine Corps Information Command (MARCOR INFOCOM) was established on 1 October 2022 to provide the Marine Corps with an operational command that was capable of unifying information-related capabilities and functions to support Fleet Marine Forces (FMF) in competition and crisis. Creation of MARFOR INFOCOM was directed by the Commandant of the Marine Corps in the May 2022 Annual Update to Force Design 2030. MARCOR INFOCOM is not “subordinate” to MARFOR CYBERCOM, but the Commander of MARFORCYBERCOM also serves as the Commanding General (CG) of MARCOR INFOCOM.

MARCOR INFOCOM comprises a headquarters staff and the following units:

- Marine Corps Information Operations Center (MCIOC)
- Marine Cryptologic Support Battalion (MCSB)
- Marine Cryptologic Office (MCO)
- Marine Lethality Office (MLO)

== List of commanders ==
No.	Commander		Term		
No.	Portrait	Name	Took office	Left office	Term length
1	George J. Flynn	Lieutenant General; George J. Flynn	21 January 2010	2013	~2 years, 346 days
2	Vincent R. Stewart	Major General; Vincent R. Stewart	2013	21 January 2015	~2 years, 20 days
3	Daniel J. O'Donohue	Major General; Daniel J. O'Donohue	21 January 2015	September 2015	~223 days
4	Loretta E. Reynolds	Major General; Loretta E. Reynolds	September 2015	2 July 2018	~2 years, 304 days
5	Matthew G. Glavy	Major General; Matthew G. Glavy	2 July 2018	7 July 2021	3 years, 5 days
6	Ryan P. Heritage	Major General; Ryan P. Heritage	7 July 2021	22 March 2024	2 years, 259 days
7	Joseph Matos	Major General; Joseph Matos	22 March 2024	18 June 2026	2 years, 88 days
8	Ahmed T. Williamson	Brigadier General; Ahmed T. Williamson	18 June 2026	Incumbent	122 days

== See also ==
- List of cyber warfare forces
