= 9th Communication Battalion =

- 9th Commmuications Battalion insignia
- Active: 1 June 1966 – present
- Country: United States of America
- Branch: United States Marine Corps
- Type: Communications
- Part of: I Marine Expeditionary Force Headquarters Group
- Nickname: 9th Comm
- Mottos: Professionalism, Reliability, Flexibility
- Engagements: Operation Desert Storm; Operation Restore Hope; Operation Iraqi Freedom

Commanders
- Current commander: LtCol Raymond N. Takor

9th Communication Battalion (9th Comm) is a communications battalion in the United States Marine Corps. It is part of the I Marine Expeditionary Force (I MEF) and is headquartered at Marine Corps Base Camp Pendleton, California.

== Subordinate units ==
- Headquarters Company
- Service Company
- Alpha Company
- Bravo Company
- Charlie Company
- Defensive Cyber Operations Internal Defensive Measures Company

== History ==
=== Early years ===
9th Communication Battalion was activated 1 June 1966 at the Marine Corps Air Ground Combat Center Twentynine Palms, California. They were assigned to Force Troops, Fleet Marine Force Pacific in July 1967. The unit was reduced to zero strength and deactivated 15 October 1974. The Communication Support Company was activated 16 October 1974 but was quickly deactivated on 30 November 1976. It was again activated on 1 December 1976 as Communication Support Company, (Reinforced), 9th Communication Battalion at 29 Palms and assigned to Force Troops, FMF, Pacific. On 15 February 1979, Force Troops was deactivated and the battalion was assigned to Marine Corps Air Ground Combat Center (MCAGCC), 29 Palms.

=== 1980s & 1990s ===
1 December 1982: Communication Company (Reinforced), 9th Communication Battalion redesignated at Camp Pendleton, California, as the 9th Communication Battalion, Fleet Marine Force
January 1984: Reassigned to I Marine Amphibious Force
5 February 1988: I Marine Amphibious Force redesignated as I Marine Expeditionary Force
July 1989: Reassigned to 1st Surveillance, Reconnaissance, and Intelligence Group, I Marine Expeditionary Force
August 1990-March 1991: Operation Desert Shield and Desert Storm, Southwest Asia
December 1992-April 1993: Operation Restore Hope, Somalia
Reassigned during June 1998 to I Marine Expeditionary Force Headquarters Group

=== Global war on terror ===
9th Comm has made four, year long deployments in support of Operation Iraqi Freedom OIF. They deployed to Kuwait in late 2002 and subsequently took part in the 2003 invasion of Iraq. After that they have spent year long deployments for OIF during 2004, 2006 and 2008.

9th Comm has also participated in multiple deployments in support of Operation Enduring Freedom OEF. Their cumulative deployments saw the installation, operation, and maintenance of the largest enterprise network ever established by a Marine Corps unit aboard Camp Leatherneck. During this time, Camp Leatherneck and surrounding areas saw significant upgrades in telecommunications infrastructure as well as an increase in the availability of commercialized network services to support all base personnel. 9th Comm's presence on Camp Leatherneck lasted until the end of operations in October 2014 when the camp was turned over to Afghan control.

== Unit awards ==
A unit citation or commendation is an award bestowed upon an organization for the action cited. Members of the unit who participated in said actions are allowed to wear on their uniforms the awarded unit citation. 9th Comm has been presented with the following awards:

Streamer	Award	Year(s)	Additional Info
	Presidential Unit Citation Streamer	2003, 2010	Iraq, Afghanistan
	Joint Meritorious Unit Award Streamer	1992–1993	Somalia
	Navy Unit Commendation Streamer with one Bronze Star		
	Meritorious Unit Commendation Streamer with one Bronze Star		
	National Defense Service Streamer with two Bronze Stars	1966–1974, 1990–1995, 2001–present	Vietnam War, Gulf War, war on terrorism
	Armed Forces Expeditionary Streamer	1992–1993	Somalia
	Southwest Asia Service Streamer with two Bronze Stars	September 1990 – February 1991	Desert Shield, Desert Storm
	Iraq Campaign Streamer		
	Global War on Terrorism Expeditionary Streamer	March – May 2003	Iraq
	Global War on Terrorism Service Streamer	2001–present	

== See also ==
- List of United States Marine Corps battalions
- Organization of the United States Marine Corps
