= United States Marine Corps Forces Strategic Command =

United States military unit

- Active: 1 October 2003 – present
- Country: United States
- Branch: United States Marine Corps
- Part of: U.S. Strategic Command
- Garrison/HQ: Offutt Air Force Base, Nebraska

Commanders
- Commander: Lt Gen Melvin G. Carter

United States Marine Corps Forces Strategic Command (abbreviated MARFORSTRAT) is the Marine Corps service component of U.S. Strategic Command. MARFORSTRAT is responsible for representing Marine Corps interests and advising the Commander, U.S. Strategic Command, on supporting Marine Forces, as well as assisting other Marine Corps commands with the usage and development of electronic warfare, and ensuring the integration of Strategic Command and the Marine Corps. It is based at the headquarters of Strategic Command at Offutt Air Force Base in Nebraska.

== History ==
U.S. Marine Corps Forces Strategic Command was established on 1 October 2003. MARFORSTRAT is responsible for representing Marine Corps interests to the Commander of Strategic Command, advising the Commander on supporting Marine Forces, and advising other Marine Corps Forces on electronic and space warfare. Its headquarters at Offut Air Force Base in Nebraska, the STRATCOM headquarters, includes four Marines and two civilian employees.

MARFORSTRAT was tasked with supporting the Marine Corps in the space warfare domain, with its staff including space operations officers. In 2020, this role was given to the newly established Marine Corps Forces Space Command, which became the Marine Corps component of the reestablished U.S. Space Command. Space operations officers from MARFORSTRAT became part of the new Marine Forces Space Command.

== Unit awards ==
The command received the following awards.

Streamer	Award	Year(s)	Additional Info
	Global War on Terrorism Service Streamer	2001–present	
	National Defense Service Streamer	2001–present	War on terrorism

== Commanders ==
The Deputy Commandant for Information is dual-hatted as Commander, Marine Corps Forces Strategic Command.
