= Marine Corps University =

University for the U.S. Marine Corps

Coordinates: 38°31′4″N 77°17′31″W

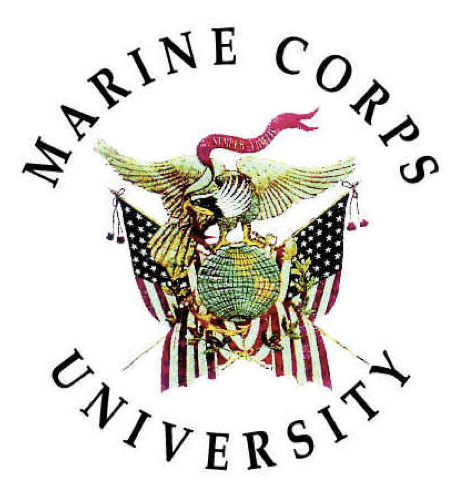
- Type: University system
- Established: August 1, 1989
- Parent institution: Naval University System; United States Marine Corps Training and Education Command
- President: Brigadier General Matthew W. Tracy
- Provost: Rebecca J. Johnson
- Location: Marine Corps Base Quantico, Virginia, United States
- Website: www.usmcu.edu

Marine Corps University is a military education university system of the United States Marine Corps. It is part of the Naval University System and accredited by the Commission on Colleges of the Southern Association of Colleges and Schools to award Master's Degrees.

== History ==
Marine Corps University (MCU) was founded on 1 August 1989 by order of the Commandant of the Marine Corps, General Alfred M. Gray. The university can trace its roots back to World War I and the birth of the modern Marine Corps. General Gray's decision to establish MCU was a logical extension of the historical legacy of many famous Marine leaders who valued the importance of education, as well as a natural extension of the contemporary shift of the Corps' warfighting doctrine to one of "maneuver warfare," with its concomitant demand for leaders who can think critically and act decisively in the face of ambiguity, fog, friction, and chance.

The Marine Corps University's history dates back to 1891 when 29 company officers attended the School of Application. This facility became the Officers Training School in 1909, and later relocated to Marine Corps Base Quantico. In 1919, Major General John A. Lejeune ordered the creation of the Marine Corps Officers Training School. Brigadier General Smedley D. Butler established the Field Officers Course in October 1920 and the Company Grade Officers Course in July 1921.

World War I was pivotal in Major General Lejeune's decision to ensure Marines of all ranks were educated in the art and science of war. Brigadier General Butler later built upon General Lejeune's concepts by developing two additional courses of instruction. The first, called the Field Officers School, welcomed its inaugural class in October 1920. The second, the Company Grade Officers School, convened its first class in July 1921. These two courses, along with the basic Marine Corps Officer Training School, soon renamed The Basic School, formed the foundation for what General Lejeune termed "Marine Corps Schools." It was this beginning that formed the basis of the Marine Corps University that exists today.

Between World War I and World War II, Marine Corps education began focusing on its future fight, specifically the study and development of amphibious warfare. In the late 1920s, comprehensive instruction in amphibious operations was developed and implemented in anticipation of the demanding requirements of this new mission. Acknowledging that not all Marine Corps officers would have the opportunity to attend resident courses, the Marine Corps began implementing correspondence courses to reach a wider breadth of potential students.

Beginning in 1930, Brigadier General James C. Breckinridge led a comprehensive redesign of the entire curriculum of all Marine Corps Schools, emphasizing amphibious warfare and close air support. Breckinridge required his officers to not only become specialists in this new "Marine Corps Science," he also demanded they become skilled instructors. He formed special groups from selected Field Officers School graduates and students to work on amphibious doctrine and requirements. In fact, General Breckinridge temporarily discontinued Field Officers School classes so that the staff and students could devote their full attention to developing the new doctrine.

Over the next several decades, Marine Corps education would consolidate and evolve. Brigadier General Breckinridge led efforts to re-designate company and field grade courses as "Amphibious Warfare" courses. In 1946, the Marine Corps revisited using its previous, three-tiered system, incorporating lessons learned from World War II. In the 1950s, the curricula began to reflect new technologies such as vertical envelopment. On 1 August 1964, the Amphibious Warfare Senior Course was re-designated as the Command and Staff College (CSC). At the same time, the Amphibious Warfare Junior Course became the Amphibious Warfare School (AWS).

Recognizing the need for enhanced enlisted education, on 16 February 1971, the Marine Corps convened the first course of the Staff Noncommissioned Officer Academy at Quantico, Virginia. This was the first of many additions to the Marine Corps professional military education continuum. Ten years later, in 1981, the Noncommissioned Officer Basic Course at 18 sites and a "Senior Course" for Staff Sergeants at Quantico, Virginia were also established. Finally, in 1982, an "Advanced Course" for First Sergeants and Master Sergeants was implemented at Quantico, Virginia.

On 6 March 1989, FMFM-1 (later, MCDP-1) Warfighting was published. This foundational document would cement the Marine Corps' commitment to maneuver warfare and initiate a modernization of the professional military education system. Thus, General Gray ordered the consolidation of five independent Marine Corps schools into a single Marine Corps University.

Now that Marine Corps University was a single entity, the institution underwent several growths in the 1990s. The Marine Corps War College (MCWAR) was established as the senior-level officer professional military education school, the Advanced Course was moved down to Gunnery Sergeants, and a new First Sergeants course was established. Additionally, a Commanders' Course for all Lieutenant Colonels and Colonels slated for command was instituted, along with annual E-8 Seminars and E-9 Symposiums. Lastly, in 1997, the College of Continuing Education was created to house all officer and enlisted distance education programs under one roof.

In 1999, MCU marked a major milestone in the maturation of its educational programs as the university was accredited by the prestigious Southern Association of Colleges and Schools Commission on Colleges (SACSCOC) to award a master's degree at the Command and Staff College. This was followed shortly thereafter by accreditation of the master's degrees of both the Marine Corps War College (2001) and the School of Advanced Warfighting (2003).

In 2002, the Amphibious Warfare School and the Command and Control Systems Course merged to become the Expeditionary Warfare School (EWS). The following year the Senior Leader Development Program (SLDP) was created to manage General Officer education. The SLDP later evolved to become the Executive Education Program (EEP) under the auspices of a new entity at MCU – the Lejeune Leadership Institute (LLI) – which is responsible for the development of leadership programs across the Marine Corps.

In 2005, the Southern Association of Colleges and Schools reaffirmed the regional accreditation of MCU's three graduate degrees. This was followed in 2010 by the successful submission of the university's Fifth Year Interim Report to the Commission. In December 2015 the Southern Association of Colleges and Schools once again reaffirmed the regional accreditation of MCU's three graduate degrees.

Recent changes at MCU include the establishment of the Brute Krulak Center for Innovation and Future Warfare, or the "Krulak Center" for short, and the re-designation of the Enlisted Professional Military Education (EPME) directorate as the College of Enlisted Military Education (CEME).

== Degree programs ==
- Marine Corps War College: On 1 August 1989, the 29th Commandant of the Marine Corps, General Alfred M. Gray, Jr., instituted the Art of War Studies program under the Marine Corps Command and Staff College. Today the mission of the Marine Corps War College is to develop, deliver, and evaluate professional military education and training through resident and nonresident programs to prepare leaders for the national security environment and to preserve, promote, and display the history and heritage of the Marine Corps. Its graduates are prepared for senior leadership positions of increasing complexity through the study of national military strategy, theater strategy and plans, and military support to those strategies within the context of national security policies and decision-making. Graduates receive a Master of Strategic Studies (MSS) degree.
- Marine Corps Command and Staff College: including the study of history, language and culture, CSC educates and trains its joint, multinational, and interagency professionals in order to produce skilled warfighting leaders for 21st Century security challenges. Command and Staff College offers students the option of completing the requirements for a Master of Military Studies (MMS) degree.
- School of Advanced Warfighting: The School of Advanced Warfighting provides a follow-on, graduate-level professional military education for selected field grade officers who have completed the Marine Corps or sister service command and staff college course. The course develops complex problem solving and decision making skills for the operational level of war. Graduates receive a Master of Operational Studies (MOS) degree.

== Schools, programs and courses ==
=== Expeditionary Warfare School ===
Formerly Amphibious Warfare School (AWS), the mission of the Expeditionary Warfare School (EWS) is to provide Marine captains career-level professional military education and oversee their professional military training in command and control, MAGTF operations ashore, and naval expeditionary operations. This is intended to enable them to command or serve as primary staff officers in their MOS, integrate the capabilities resident within their element of the MAGTF, integrate their element within the MAGTF, and understand the functions of the other elements of the MAGTF.

=== Marine Corps Command and Staff College (CSC) ===
The Marine Corps Command and Staff College provides graduate level education and training to develop critical thinkers, innovative problem solvers, and ethical leaders to serve as commanders and staff officers in service, joint, interagency, intergovernmental, and multinational organizations. The Command and Staff College is a ten-month program for majors, lieutenant commanders, allied foreign officers, and U.S. government civilian professionals that fulfills Joint Professional Military Education Phase I requirements. Students come from all branches of the US Armed Forces. Students have the option of completing the requirements for a Master of Military Studies (MMS) degree. MCU-CSC is also known for its civilian faculty members, many of whom conduct research into national security issues.

=== Marine Corps War College (MCWAR) ===
==== School of Advanced Warfighting ====
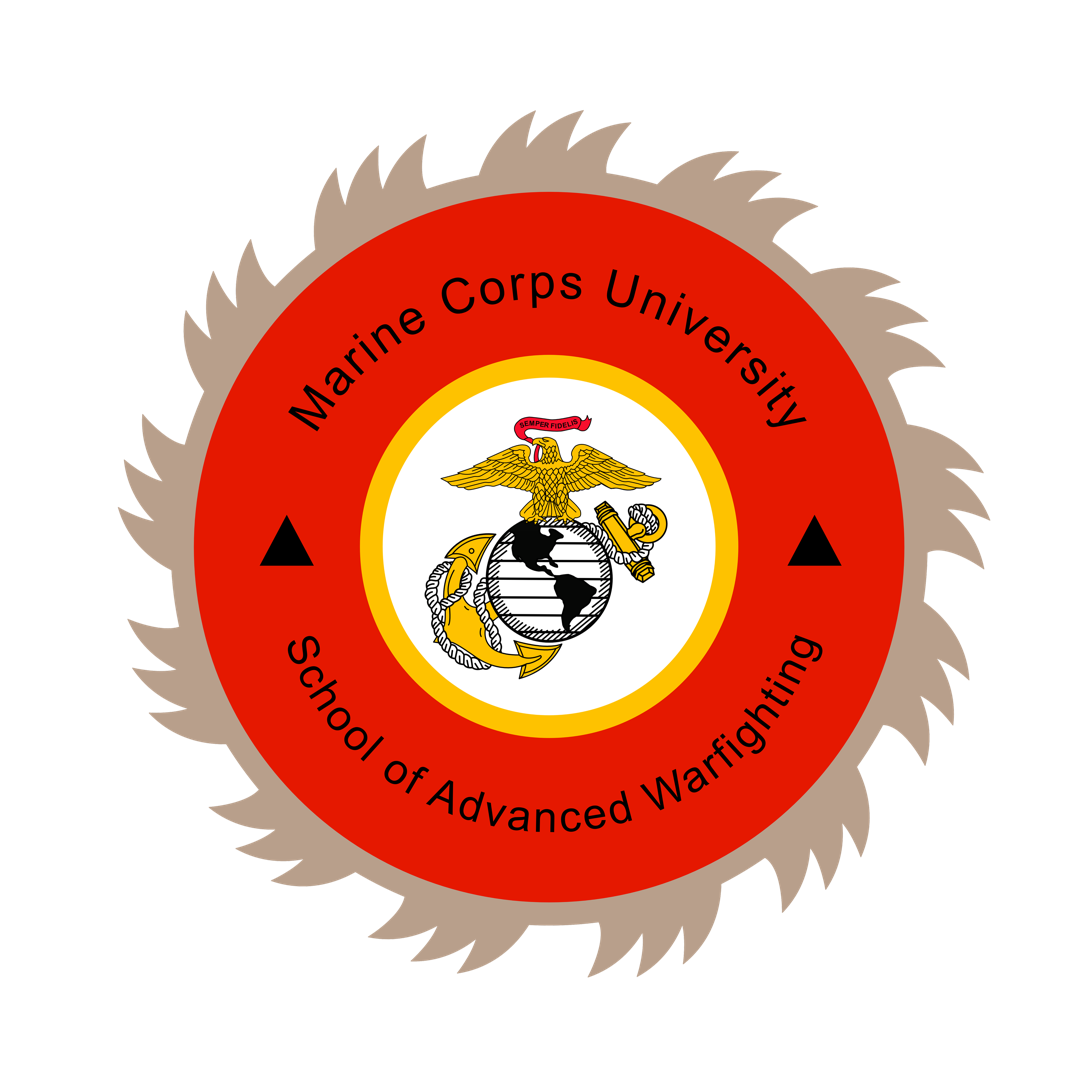
School of Advanced Warfighting

The mission of the School of Advanced Warfighting (SAW) is to develop lead planners and future commanders with the will and intellect to solve complex problems, employ operational art, and design and execute campaigns .

==== Enlisted Professional Military Education ====
The mission of the Enlisted Professional Military Education branch is to provide progressive educational opportunities to improve leadership, critical thinking capability and sound tactical skills for enlisted Marines.

==== School of MAGTF Logistics ====
The mission of the School of Marine Air-Ground Task Force (MAGTF) Logistics (SOML) is to provide the logistics education for the Marine Corps, and to manage the logistics education programs in order to increase the combat effectiveness of Marine Corps operating forces, Marine Forces Reserve, the supporting establishment, and Headquarters Marine Corps.

=== Other programs ===
- College of Distance Education and Training
- Professional Development Division includes the Commanders' Program, Professional Reading, and Senior Leader Development Program
- Staff Non-commissioned Officer Academy
- Center for Regional and Security Studies

== Marine Corps University Press ==
Marine Corps University Press is a university press affiliated with Marine Corps University. It is located in Quantico, Virginia. The press is currently a member of the Association of University Presses.

== See also ==
- Air University
- Army University
- Center for Advanced Operational Culture Learning
