= United States Space Command =

Unified command of the U.S. Department of Defense

- Seal of the United States Space Command
- Active: 23 September 1985 – 1 October 2002 (16 years, 10 months) (first incarnation) 29 August 2019 – present (6 years, 8 months) (second incarnation)
- Country: United States
- Type: Unified combatant command
- Role: Space command
- Part of: Department of Defense
- Headquarters: Peterson Space Force Base, Colorado, U.S.
- March: "Space Command March"
- Decorations: Joint Meritorious Unit Award
- Website: www.spacecom.mil

Commanders
- Commander: Gen Stephen Whiting, USSF
- Deputy Commander: LTG Richard Zellmann, USA
- Command Senior Enlisted Leader: CMSgt Jacob C. Simmons, USSF

Insignia
- Flag

The United States Space Command (USSPACECOM or SPACECOM) is a unified combatant command of the United States Department of Defense, responsible for military operations in outer space, specifically all operations 100 kilometers (62 miles) and greater above mean sea level. U.S. Space Command is responsible for the operational employment of space forces that are provided by the uniformed services of the Department of Defense.

Space Command was originally created in September 1985 to provide joint command and control for all military forces in outer space and coordinate with the other combatant commands. SPACECOM was disestablished in 2002, and its responsibilities and forces were merged into the United States Strategic Command. It was reestablished on 29 August 2019, with a reemphasized focus on space as a warfighting domain.

The U.S. Space Force is the military service responsible for organizing, training, and equipping the majority of forces for U.S. Space Command, which also includes a smaller number of forces from each of the other branches of the U.S. Armed Forces.

== Mission ==
U.S. Space Command, working with allies and partners, plans, executes, and integrates military spacepower into multi-domain global operations in order to deter aggression, defend national interests, and when necessary, defeat threats.

U.S. Space Command has four "space truths" that provide the foundation for its vision and operations:

- Space is a vital interest that is integral to the American way of life and national security.
- Space superiority enables the Joint Force to rapidly transition from competition to conflict and prevail in a global, all-domain fight.
- Space warfighters generate the combat power to win in space.
- Space provides the warfighter a combat advantage from the ultimate high ground to the last tactical mile.

== History ==
=== Early military space defense ===
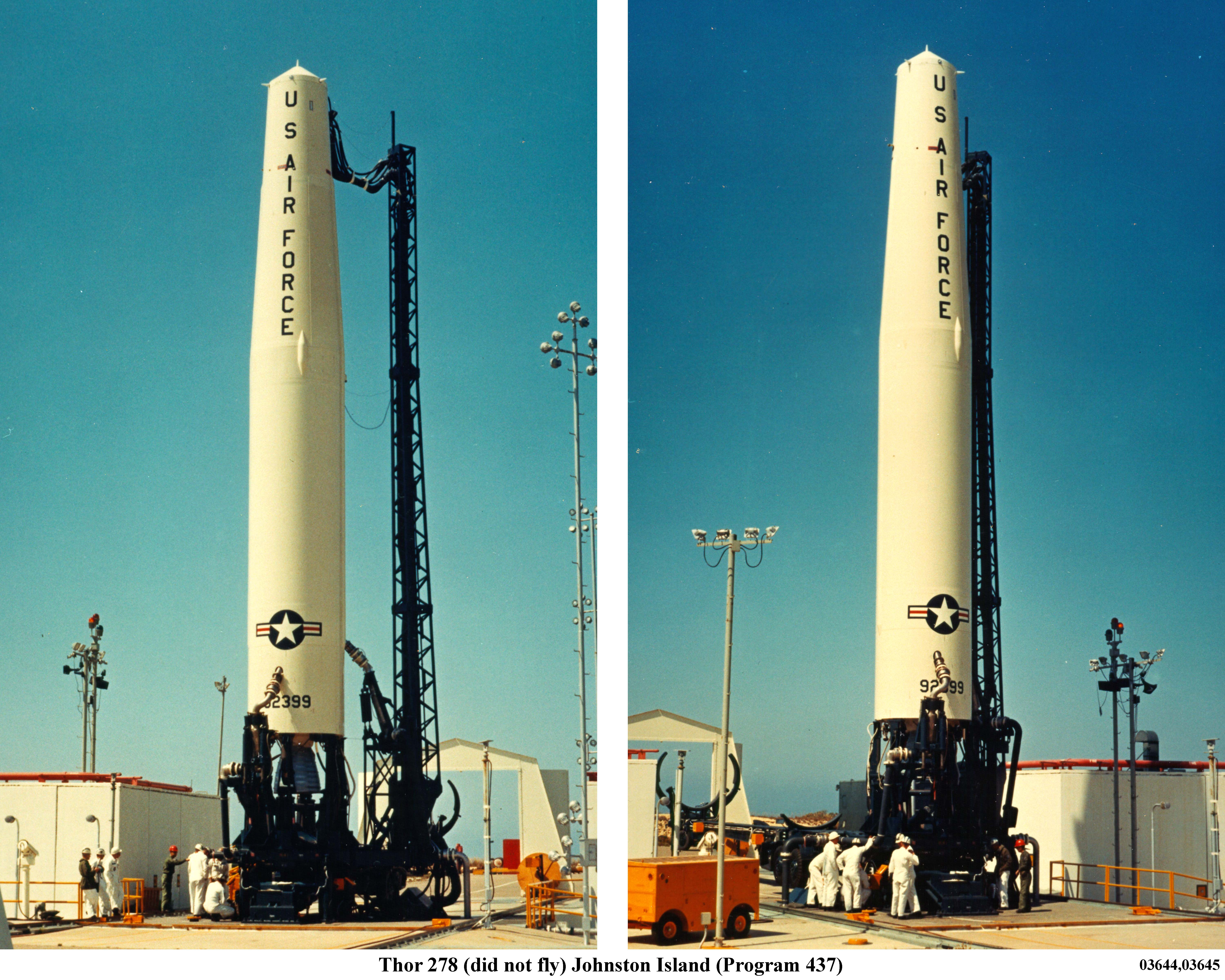
Program 437 PGM-17 Thor anti-satellite missiles

Early military space activities were predominantly focused on research and development, rather than operations, and split across the Air Force, Army, and Navy. In 1959, Admiral Arleigh Burke proposed the creation of the Defense Astronautical Agency to control all military space programs. This proposal was supported by the Army and Navy, but opposed by the Air Force.

Arguing that space defense was an extension of air defense, the Joint Chiefs of Staff ultimately agreed with the Air Force, putting operational control of space defense forces under the unified Continental Air Defense Command and multinational North American Air Defense Command in 1960. In 1975, Continental Air Defense Command was inactivated and replaced with Aerospace Defense Command (ADCOM), a specified command led by the Air Force. In 1981, North American Air Defense Command changed its name to North American Aerospace Defense Command to better reflect its role in both air and space defense.

=== Strategic Defense Initiative and the first U.S. Space Command ===
First U.S. Space Command service components
Name	Headquarters	Dates
Army service components
Army Space Planning Group		1985–1986
Army Space Agency	Colorado Springs, Colorado	1986–1988
Army Space Command		1988–August 1992
Army Space and Strategic Defense Command	Redstone Arsenal, Alabama	August 1992–1 October 1998
Army Space and Missile Defense Command	Redstone Arsenal, Alabama	1 October 1997 – 1 October 2002
Naval service components
Naval Space Command	Dahlgren, Virginia	1 October 1985 – July 2002
Naval Network Warfare Command	Norfolk, Virginia	July 2002 – 1 October 2002
Air Force service components
Air Force Space Command	Peterson Space Force Base, Colorado	23 September 1985 – 23 March 1992
Fourteenth Air Force	Vandenberg Air Force Base, California	23 March 1992 – 1 October 2002

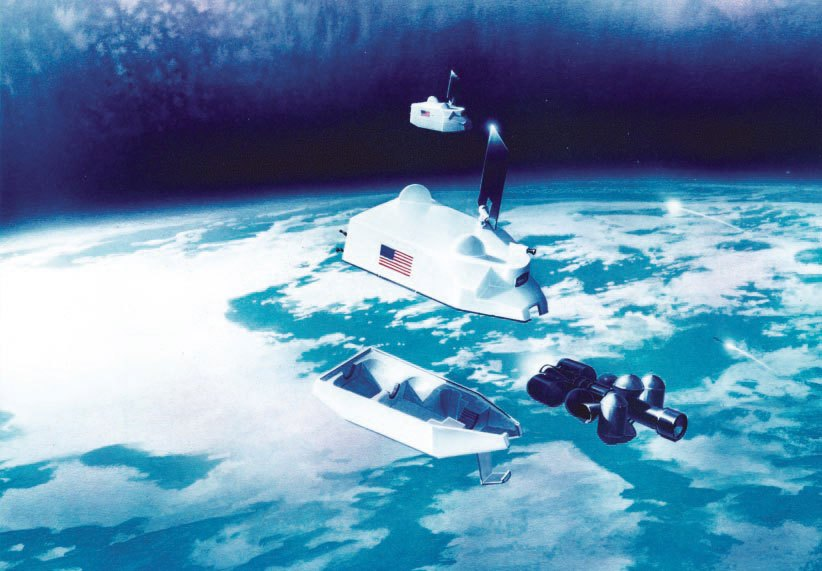
Strategic Defense Initiative Brilliant Pebbles were intended to intercept a ballistic missile in space

The Reagan Administration's Strategic Defense Initiative brought a new focus on space. In 1983, General James V. Hartinger, the commander of Aerospace Defense Command and Air Force Space Command, proposed movement towards a unified space command. The Air Force supported a unified command, which would be dominated by the aerospace service, however, the Army, Navy, and Marine Corps were satisfied with the current arrangement. However, the White House supported the Air Force's position that a unified command should be created, and on 20 November 1984, President Ronald Reagan approved its establishment. U.S. Space Command's missions would include integrating tactical warning and space operations, including control of space, direction of space support activities, and planning for ballistic missile defense. U.S. Space Command would also replace Aerospace Defense Command as the supporting U.S. command to North American Aerospace Defense Command, sharing the same commander.

On 23 September 1985, U.S. Space Command was activated as a functional combatant command at Peterson Air Force Base, Colorado Springs and Aerospace Defense Command was inactivated on 19 December 1986. In February 1988, U.S. Space Command was assigned the ballistic missile defense mission in preparation for assuming operational command of the Strategic Defense Initiative. However, the end of the Cold War significantly reduced the investment in SDI.

In 1991, the Joint Chiefs of Staff debated establishing U.S. Strategic Command assume responsibility for nuclear deterrence, missile defense, and space. U.S. Space Command would have been made a sub-unified command under the U.S. Strategic Command. However, the decisive role played by U.S. Space Command in the Persian Gulf War prevented its absorption into U.S. Strategic Command, providing tactical missile warning, GPS, and other space data to forces in theater.

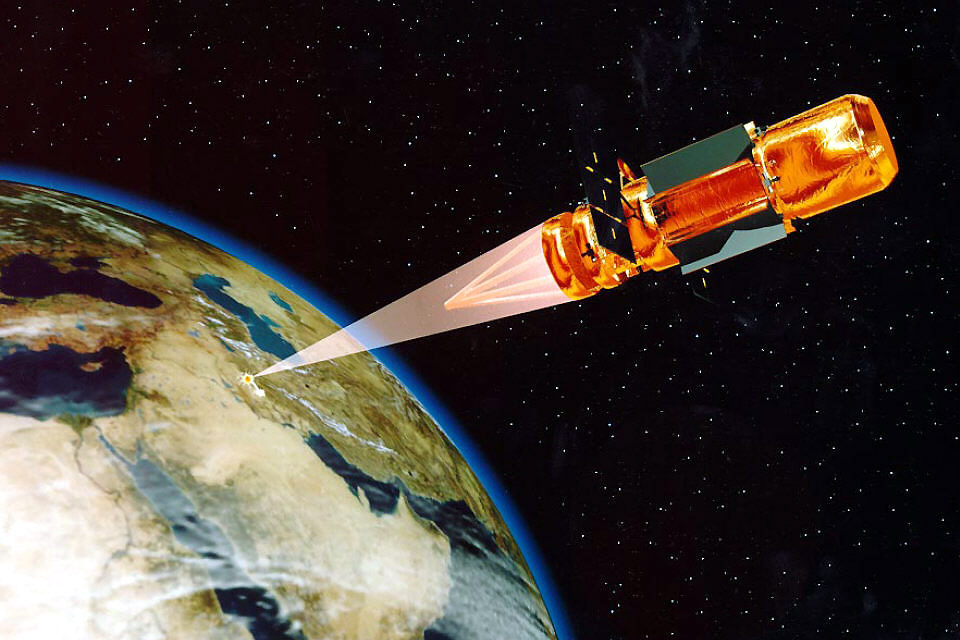
Concept for a space-based directed energy weapon from United States Space Command: A Vision for 2020

In 1997, General Howell M. Estes III proposed designating space as a geographic area of responsibility, transitioning U.S. Space Command from a functional to a geographic command. This effort was opposed by the Joint Staff, the State Department, and the National Security Council and did not occur. However, there was growing discussion about giving U.S. Space Command the mission for information support and renaming it to United States Space and Information Command. While U.S. Space Command was not renamed, it did assume responsibility for information, or cyberspace, operations.

Following the September 11 attacks, there was a growing focus on homeland defense and counter-terrorism at the expense of space. The Defense Department was intent on establishing United States Northern Command, merging U.S. Space Command and U.S. Strategic Command in 2002. On 1 October 2002, the first U.S. Space Command was shut down.

=== Space in U.S. Strategic Command ===
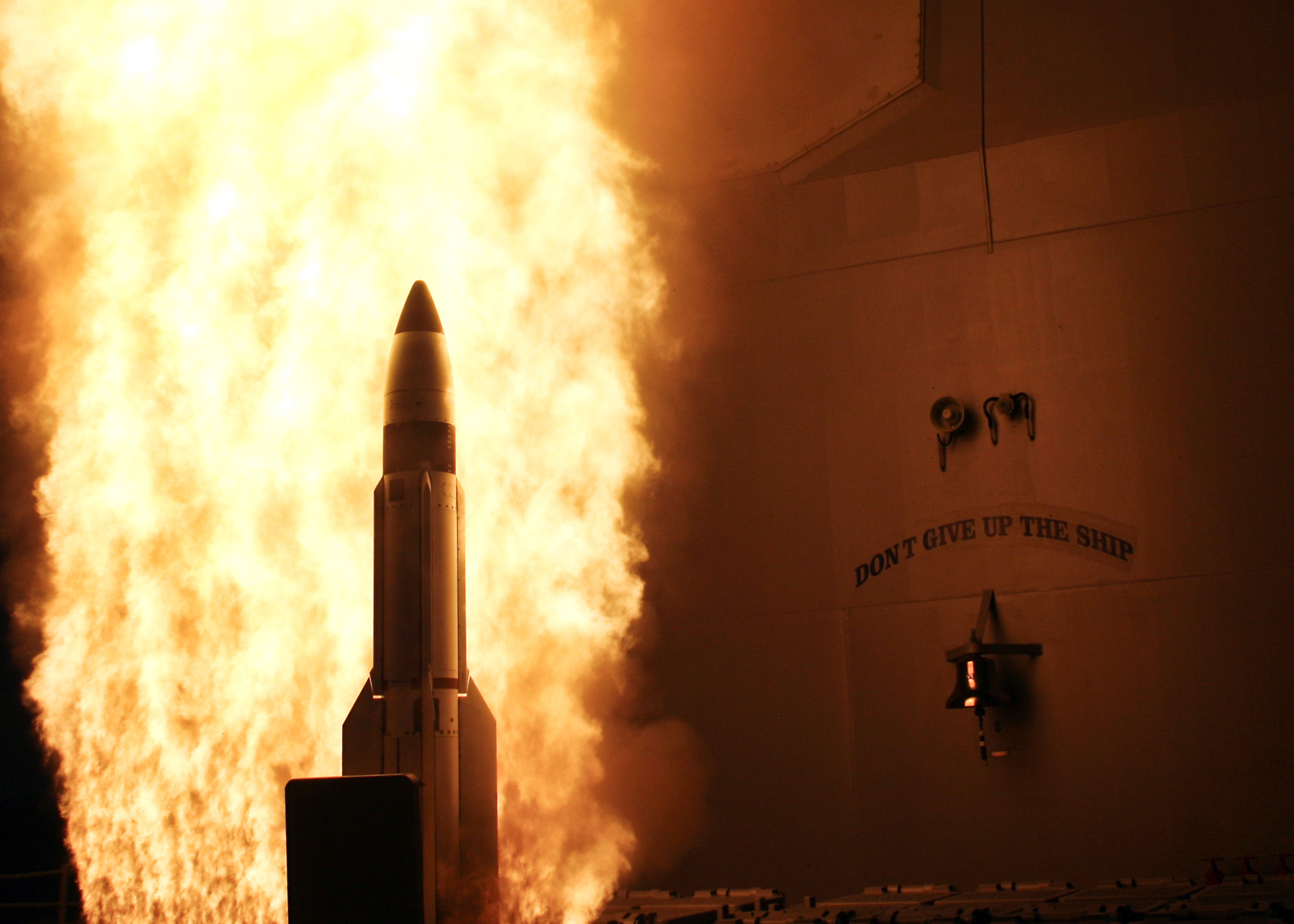
A SM-3 launches from the USS Lake Erie as part of Operation Burnt Frost

On 1 October 2002, as U.S. Space Command inactivated, a new U.S. Strategic Command at Offutt Air Force Base, Nebraska, stood up. Within STRATCOM, the responsibilities for space operations were initially managed by the Joint Functional Component Command for Space and Global Strike, led by the commander of the Air Force's Eighth Air Force. However, in 2006, space regained its own functional component under U.S. Strategic Command, under the command of the Fourteenth Air Force commanded.

Following the inactivation of U.S. Space Command in 2002, Russia and China began developing sophisticated on-orbit capabilities and an array of counter-space weapons. In particular, China conducted the 2007 Chinese anti-satellite missile test, destroying its Fengyun spacecraft, which, according to NASA, created 2,841 high-velocity debris items, a larger amount of dangerous space junk than any other space event in history. In 2008, U.S. Strategic Command conducted Operation Burnt Frost to destroy a non-functioning National Reconnaissance Office satellite, before its toxic hydrazine tank could reenter and cause potential harm to human safety, with a RIM-161 Standard Missile 3 launched from the USS Lake Erie.

This construct lasted until 2017, when the commander of Air Force Space Command became the Joint Force Space Component Commander, replacing it.

=== U.S. Space Command reestablished ===
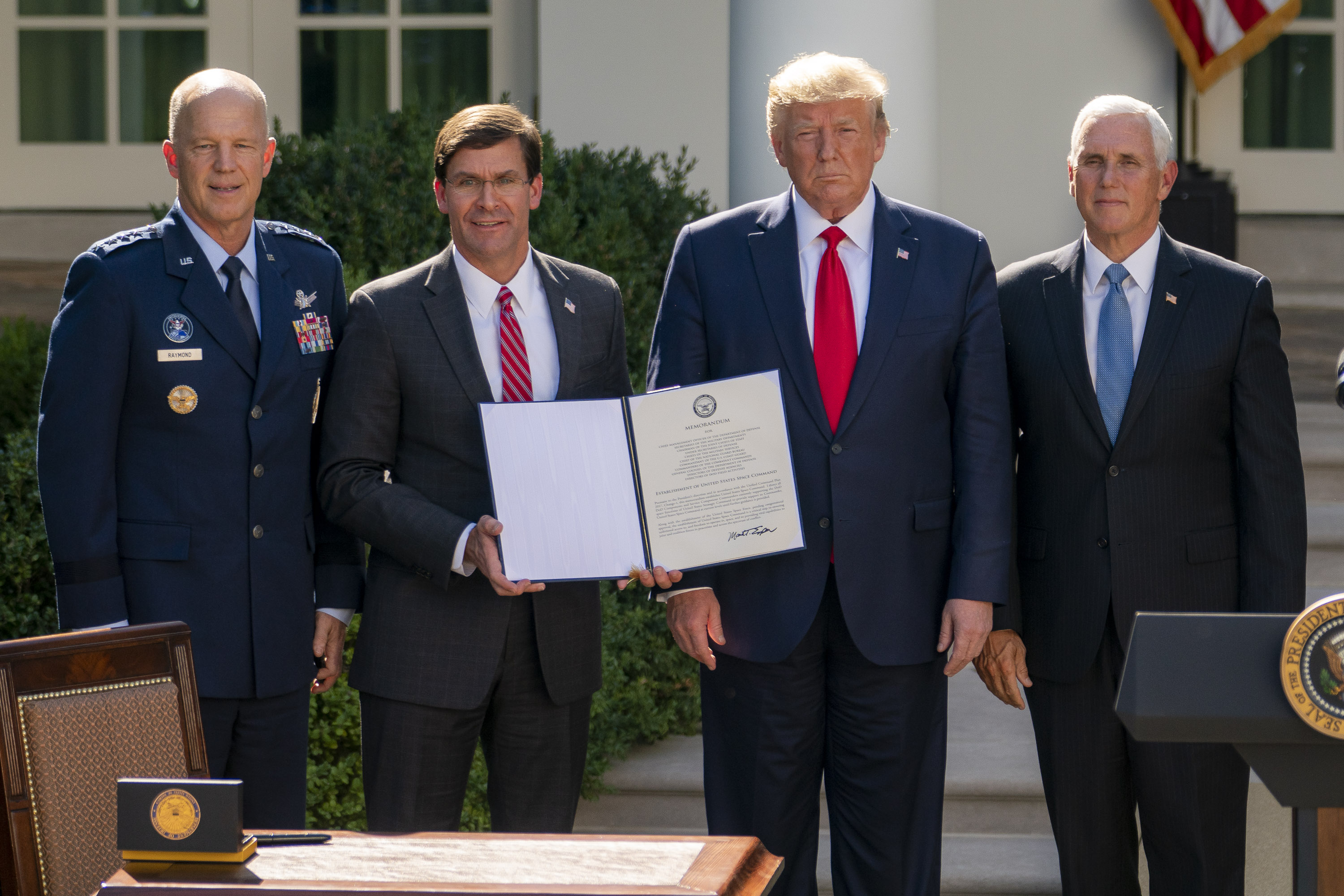
Left to right: USSPACECOM Commander General John Raymond, Secretary of Defense Mark Esper, President Donald Trump and Vice President Mike Pence in the White House Rose Garden for the 2019 reestablishment signing ceremony

The 2019 National Defense Authorization Act, which was signed into law in 2018, directed the re-establishment of U.S. Space Command as a sub-unified combatant command under U.S. Strategic Command; however, in December 2018, the Trump administration directed that U.S. Space Command instead be a newly established, full unified combatant command, with full responsibilities for space.

On 26 March 2019, U.S. Air Force General John Raymond was nominated to be the commander of the second establishment of USSPACECOM, pending Senate approval. In 2019 the Department of the Air Force released the list of finalists for the location of Headquarters Space Command: Cheyenne Mountain Air Force Station, Schriever Air Force Base, Peterson Air Force Base, Buckley Air Force Base, Vandenberg Air Force Base, and Redstone Arsenal. U.S. Space Command was officially reestablished as a geographic combatant command on 29 August 2019, during a ceremony at the White House. The former Joint Force Space Component Commander was dissolved and folded into Space Command. Following the creation of the United States Space Force in December 2019, the Department of the Air Force widened its search for a location of Space Command's permanent headquarters.

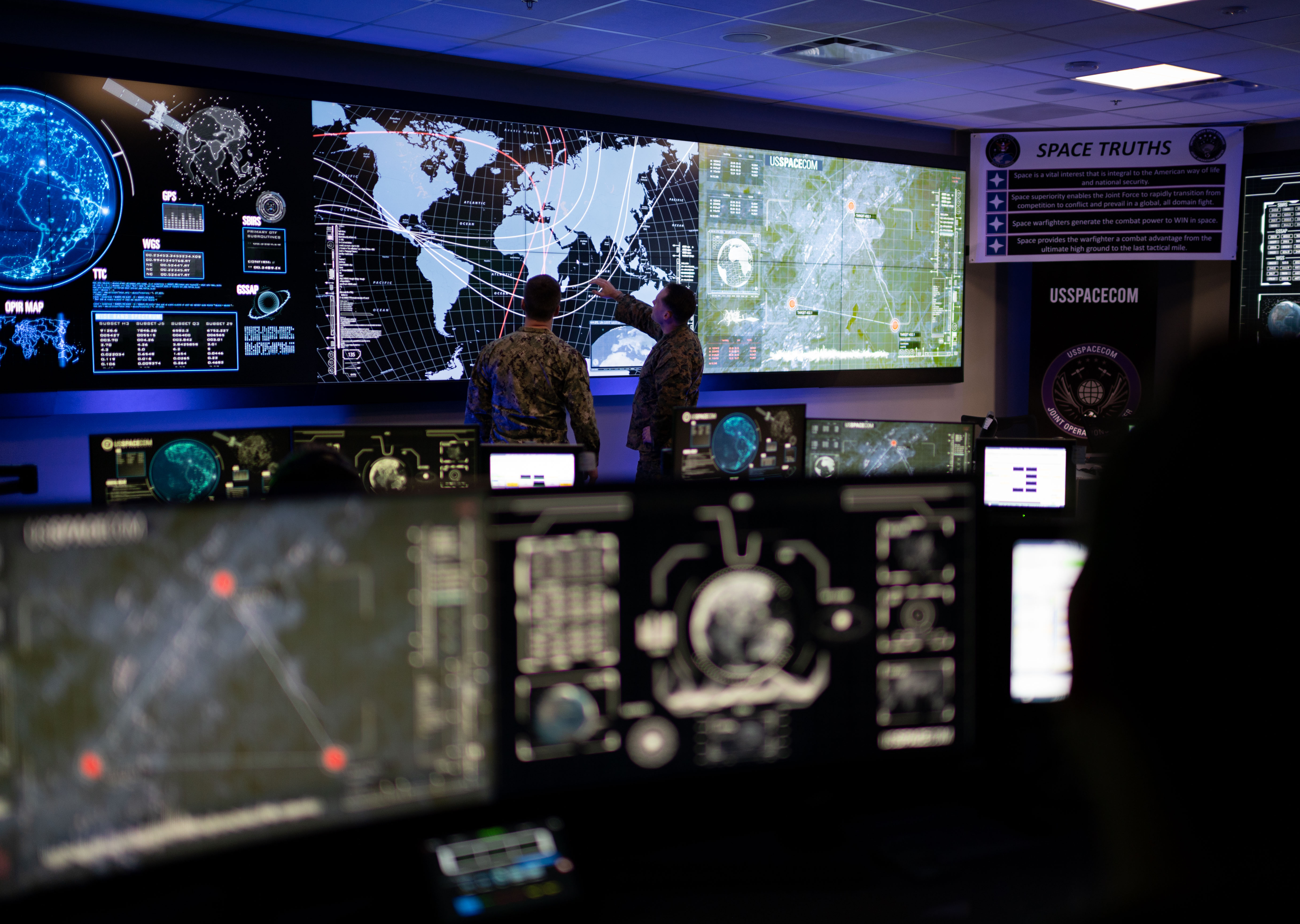
The U.S. Space Command Joint Operations Center

USSPACECOM has two subordinate commands: Combined Force Space Component Command (CFSCC), and Joint Task Force Space Defense (JTF-SD). CFSCC plans, integrates, conducts, and assesses global space operations in order to deliver combat relevant space capabilities to Combatant Commanders, Coalition partners, the Joint Force, and the Nation. JTF-SD conducts, in unified action with mission partners, space superiority operations to deter aggression, defend U.S. and allied interests, and defeat adversaries throughout the continuum of conflict.

In August 2020, In the meeting of the National Space Council, acting Director of National Intelligence announced ''in case of an attack on the U.S. satellites the operational control of intelligence community assets will be in the ambit of the military'', resulting in the National Reconnaissance Office being operationally subordinated to the commander of U.S. Space Command in matters of space defense.

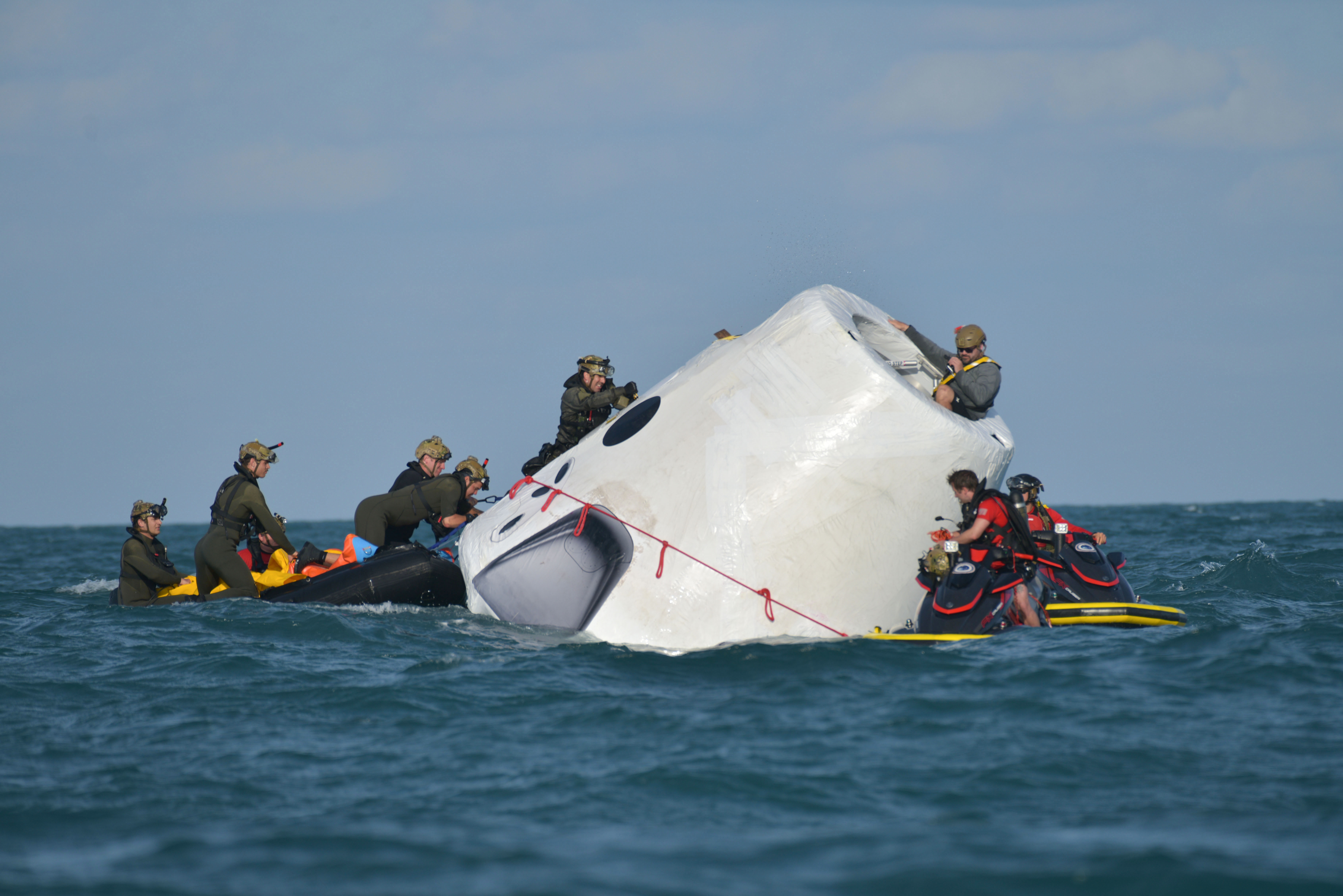
Air Force pararescue teams practice recovery of a space capsule

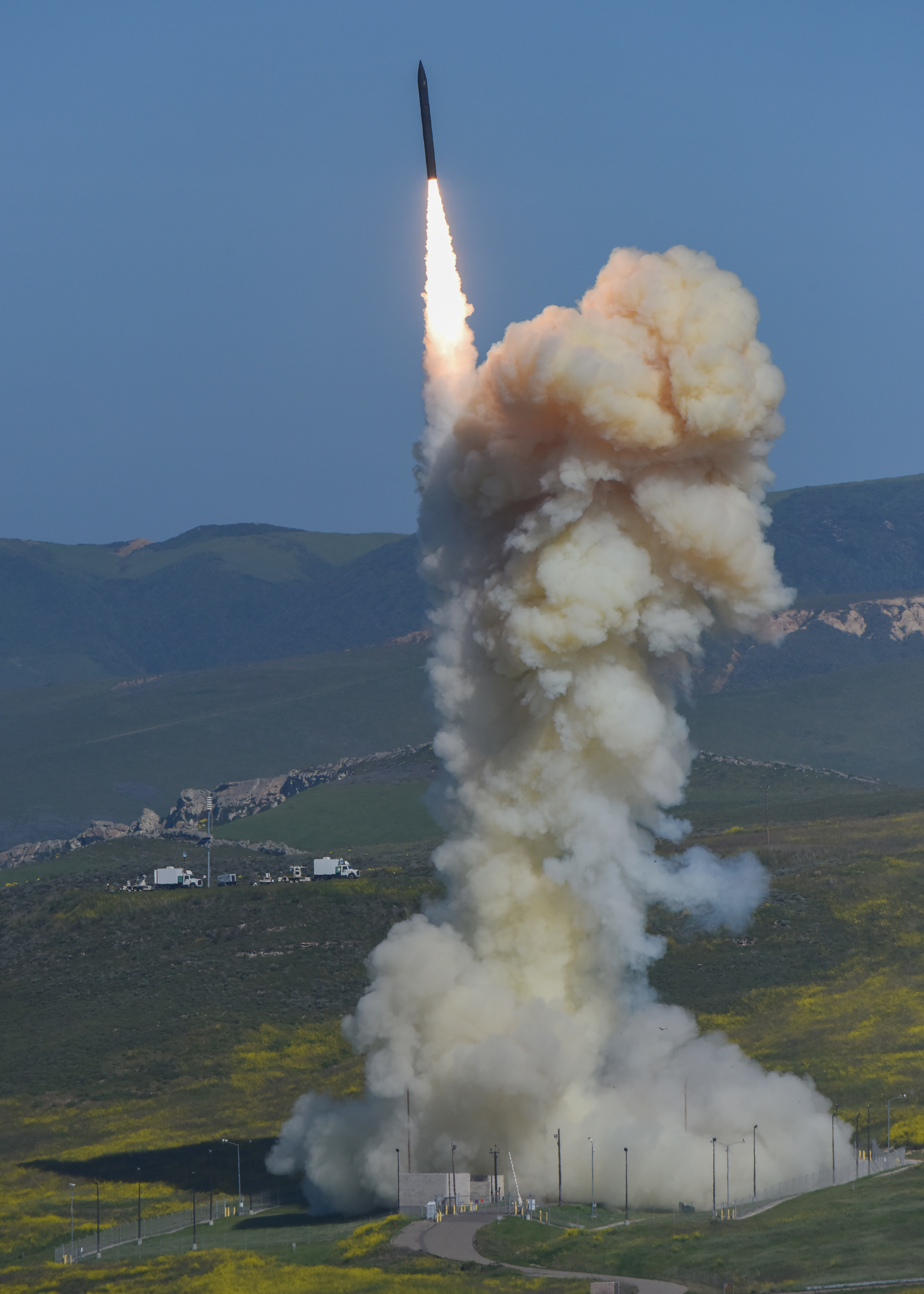
Launch of a U.S. Army Ground-Based Interceptor

On 24 August 2021, two years after its establishment, U.S. Space Command announced that it had reached initial operating capability. Achieving full operating capability, according to Lieutenant General John E. Shaw, deputy commander of U.S. Space Command, is dependent on the selection of the combatant command's permanent headquarters.

U.S. Space Command is planning to reorganize its subordinate commands, possibly reactivating the Joint Force Space Component Command (JFSCC), the precursor organization of the combatant command. JFSSC is planned to be the combatant command's "primary warfighting command," formed by combining CFSCC and JTF–SD. Space Force Lieutenant General Stephen Whiting, commander of SpOC, is planned to lead the new organization.

In 2023, U.S. Space Command regained its responsibility for missile defense from U.S. Strategic Command and will be taking over the Joint Functional Component Command for Integrated Missile Defense.

==== Headquarters ====
In January 2021, it was announced that Redstone Arsenal in Huntsville, Alabama was the preferred final location for U.S. Space Command. The other locations in contention were Kirtland Air Force Base, Offutt Air Force Base, Joint Base San Antonio, its interim location at Peterson Space Force Base, and Patrick Space Force Base. Despite Peterson Space Force Base in Colorado being both the original and interim location of Space Command headquarters, Redstone Arsenal was selected, reportedly due to political pressure directly from then-president Donald Trump. A formal review from the Department of Defense Inspector General was initiated to ensure the process that selected Huntsville as the preferred location was impartial and factually sound. Former Secretary of Defense Lloyd Austin came out with his public support and backed the Department of the Air Force's decision process which resulted in the selection of Redstone Arsenal. In May 2022, the review found that the selection of Redstone Arsenal as the permanent site was reasonable and justified. In July 2023, the move to Huntsville was cancelled. General James H. Dickinson, USA, Commander of the U.S. Space Command, argued that moving the headquarters to Alabama from its current location in Colorado Springs would hurt military readiness. Republicans have accused the Biden administration of acting due to a partisan standoff over the Pentagon's abortion access policies at the time.

Relocation discussions intensified in early 2025, with the change in administrations. U.S. Rep. Mike Rogers (R-Ala.), who chairs the House Armed Services Committee, predicted an announcement by the end of April, but no such statement was issued. On 2 May 2025, two sources told a Huntsville television station that a decision had been reached to move USSPACECOM to Redstone Arsenal and—barring a reversal—the announcement would follow confirmation of a new Secretary of the Air Force. On 2 Sep 2025, President Donald Trump announced in the Oval Office that the headquarters will be moved to Huntsville, Alabama. The new headquarters facility is expected to be completed in 2031 with the complete move of all personnel by 2032. At least 1,400 civilian employees will be moved from Colorado to Alabama with 50 percent to move to temporary facilities by 2028.

== Organization ==
Name	Function	Headquarters
Service components
United States Space Forces – Space; Combined Joint Force Space Component Commander (CJFSCC)	Plans, integrates, conducts, and assesses global space operations in order to deliver combat relevant space effects, in, from, and to space	Vandenberg Space Force Base, California
Army Space and Missile Defense Command	Develop and provide Army space, missile defense, and high altitude forces	Redstone Arsenal, Alabama
Marine Corps Forces Space Command	Provides space operational support to the Fleet Marine Force	Peterson Space Force Base, Colorado
Navy Space Command	Responsible for Navy information network operations, offensive and defensive cyberspace operations, space operations and signals intelligence	Fort Meade, Maryland
Air Forces Space	Ensures the aerospace control and air defense of the continental United States, U.S. Virgin Islands and Puerto Rico	Tyndall Air Force Base, Florida
Functional components
Joint Functional Component Command for Integrated Missile Defense	Synchronizes global missile defense planning	Schriever Space Force Base, Colorado
Combined Space Operations Center (subordinated to SPACEFOR–SPACE)	Execute operational command and control of space forces to achieve theater and global objectives.	Vandenberg Space Force Base, California
Joint Navigation Warfare Center (subordinate to SPACEFOR–SPACE)	Enable positioning, navigation and timing superiority	Kirtland Air Force Base, New Mexico
Joint Overhead Persistent Infrared Center (subordinate to SPACEFOR–SPACE)	Conduct integrated mission management to optimize the overhead persistent infrared enterprise	Buckley Space Force Base, Colorado
Missile Warning Center (subordinate to SPACEFOR–SPACE)	Delivers global strategic and theater missile warning and nuclear detonation detection	Cheyenne Mountain Space Force Station, Colorado
National Space Defense Center (subordinate to SPACEFOR–SPACE)	Coordinates military, intelligence, civil, and commercial space for unified space defense operations	Schriever Space Force Base, Colorado
Joint Force Headquarters Cyber - Air Force	Cyber support from U.S. Cyber Command	Joint Base San Antonio, Texas

Previous, now-deactivated functional components included the Combined Force Space Component Command at Vandenberg Space Force Base, California, and the Joint Task Force–Space Defense at Schriever Space Force Base, Colorado. Both were disestablished with the creation of U.S. Space Forces – Space to take on SpOC's Space Force responsibilities.

=== Relationship with the United States Space Force ===
United States Space Command is the unified combatant command for all military space operations, while the United States Space Force is the military service responsible for organizing, training, and equipping the majority of forces for U.S. Space Command. Space Command's Space Force service component is United States Space Forces – Space, providing the majority of space forces. U.S. Space Command also consists of smaller amounts of forces from the United States Army, United States Marine Corps, United States Navy, and United States Air Force. This mirrors the relationship between the Space Force's predecessor, Air Force Space Command, and U.S. Space Command (and between 2002 and 2019, United States Strategic Command).

== Emblem and symbols ==
Seals of United States Space Command and its predecessors
U.S. Space Command (2019–present)

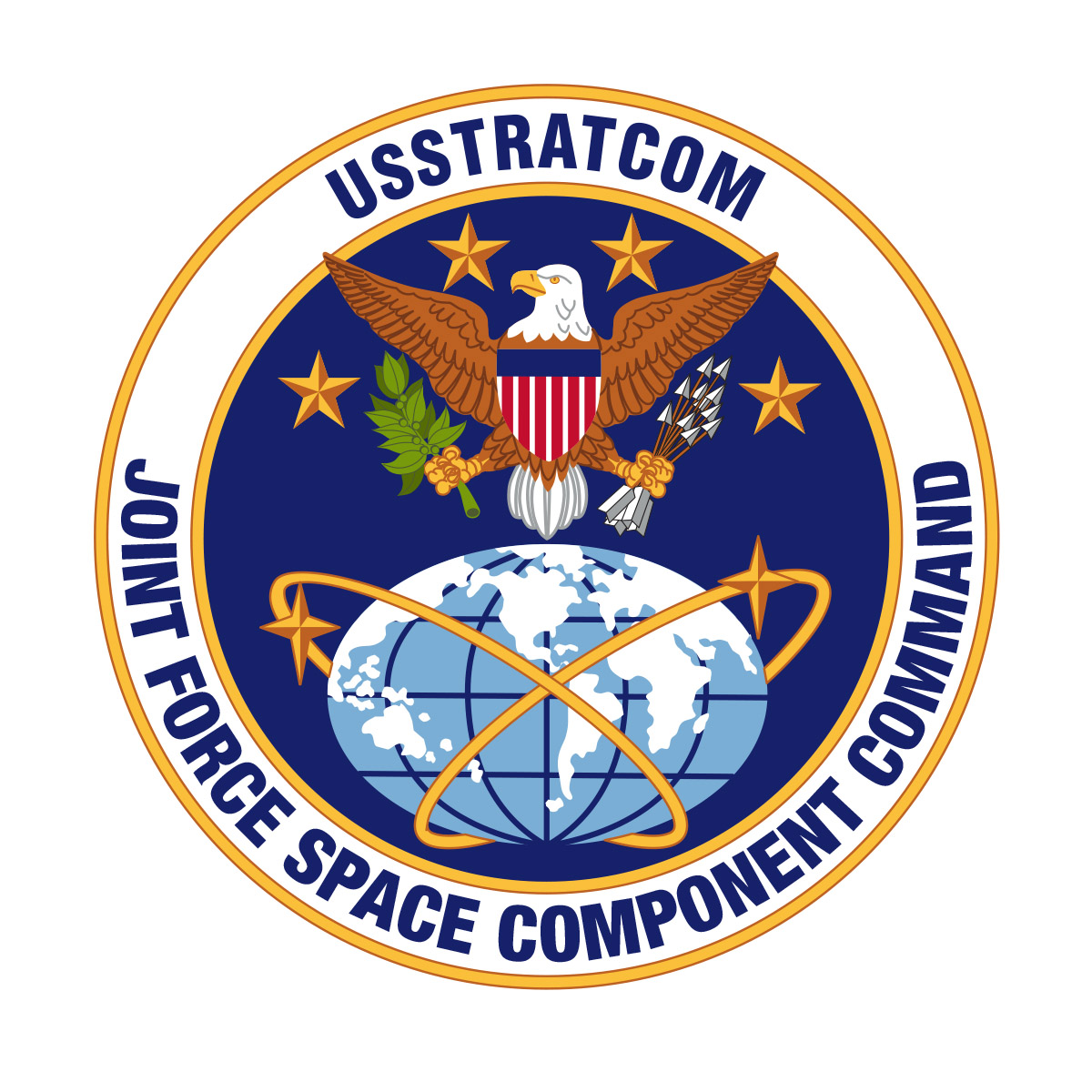
Joint Force Space Component Commander (2017–2019)

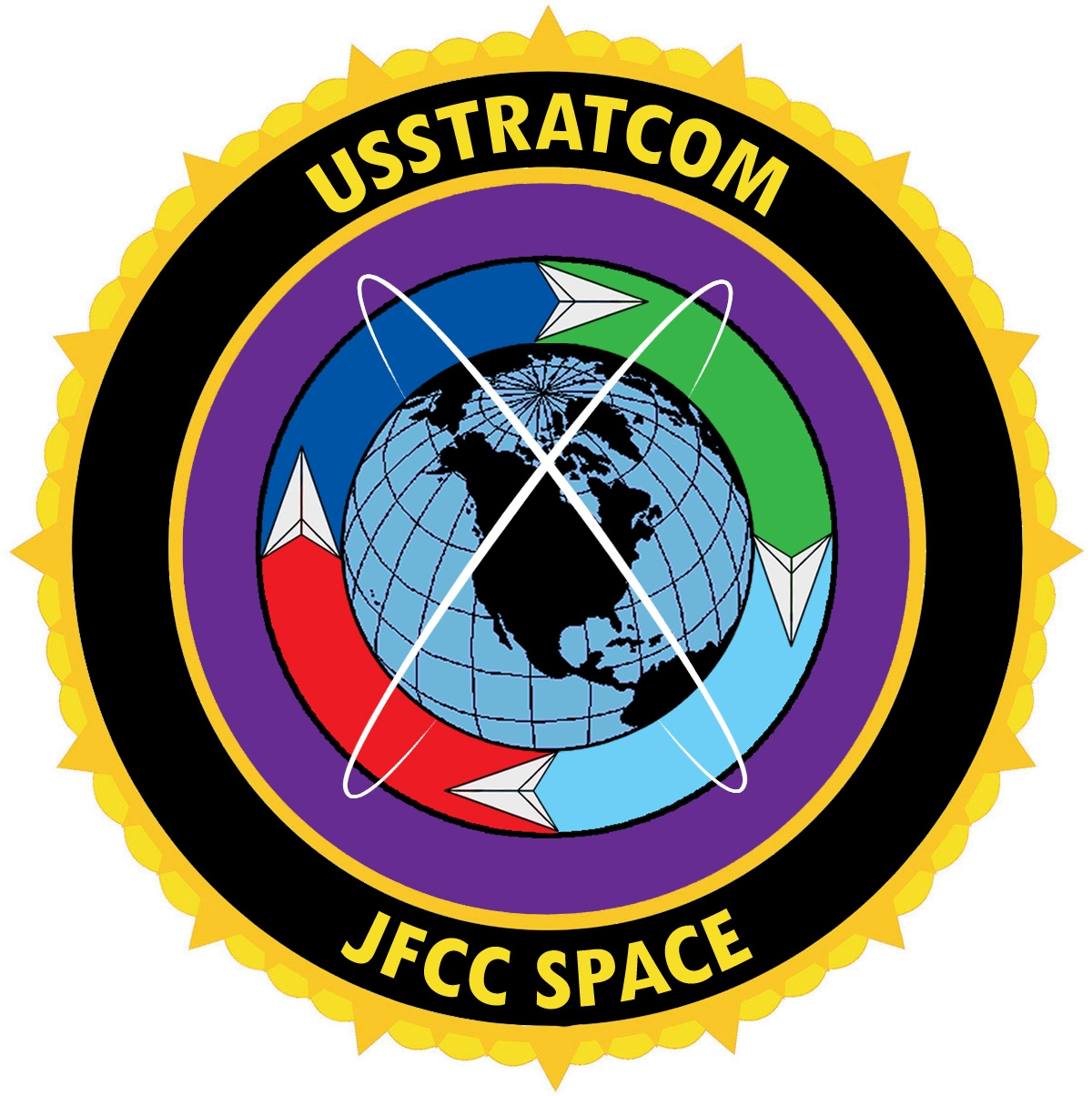
Joint Functional Component Command for Space (2006–2017)

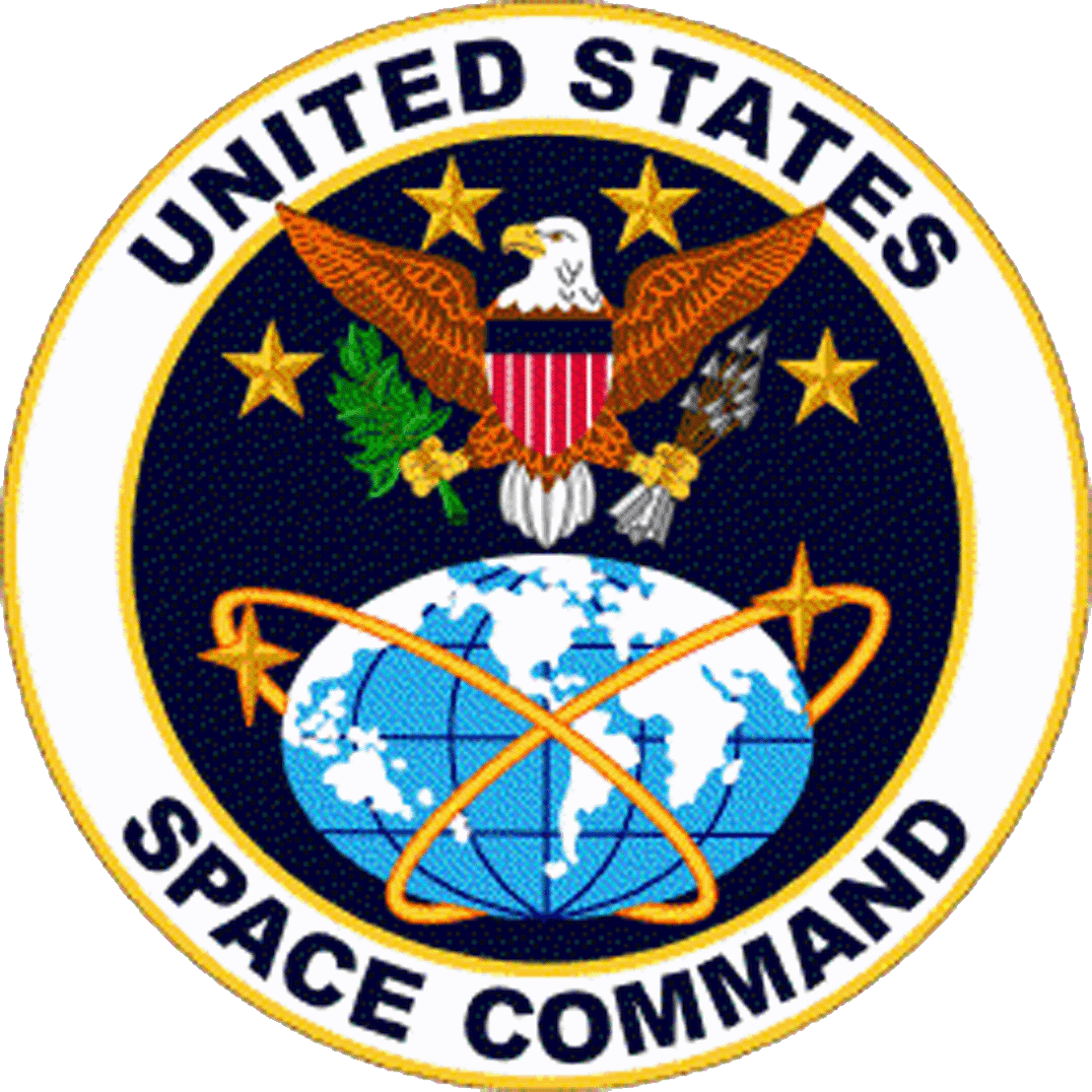
U.S. Space Command (1985–2002)

=== U.S. Space Command seal (2019) ===
Shield: The bald eagle, a traditional symbol of American strength and vigilance, carries an olive branch in his right talon, symbolizing the worldwide goal of peaceful operations in space. In his left talon is a cluster of thirteen arrows with the silver delta as arrowheads, indicative of the strength and power necessary to protect our citizens and allies. The delta symbol is historically associated with space and represents change and innovation, and the cluster of deltoids thrusting upward into space signifies our ever growing aspirations in space beyond earth’s orbit. The blue globe with silver land masses, as viewed from space, signifies the origin and control point for all space assets and represents the global operations of the command in mission areas such as surveillance, navigation, communications and missile warning. The silver and white Polaris signifies our constant presence and vigilance in space now and in the future. Encompassing the globe are two white elliptical orbits representing the unity of U.S. Space Command with our joint and combined partners, and which intersect over the United States, the terrestrial heart of the command. An arc of four silver stars above the eagle symbolizes the four-star combatant commander of U.S. Space Command. The black background represents the infinity of space.

Seal: The coat of arms as blazoned in full color on a black disk, bearing the night sky, enclosed by a silver border, and inscribed "UNITED STATES" above and "SPACE COMMAND" below, all silver.

=== Army element shoulder sleeve and distinctive unit insignia ===
Army element insignia
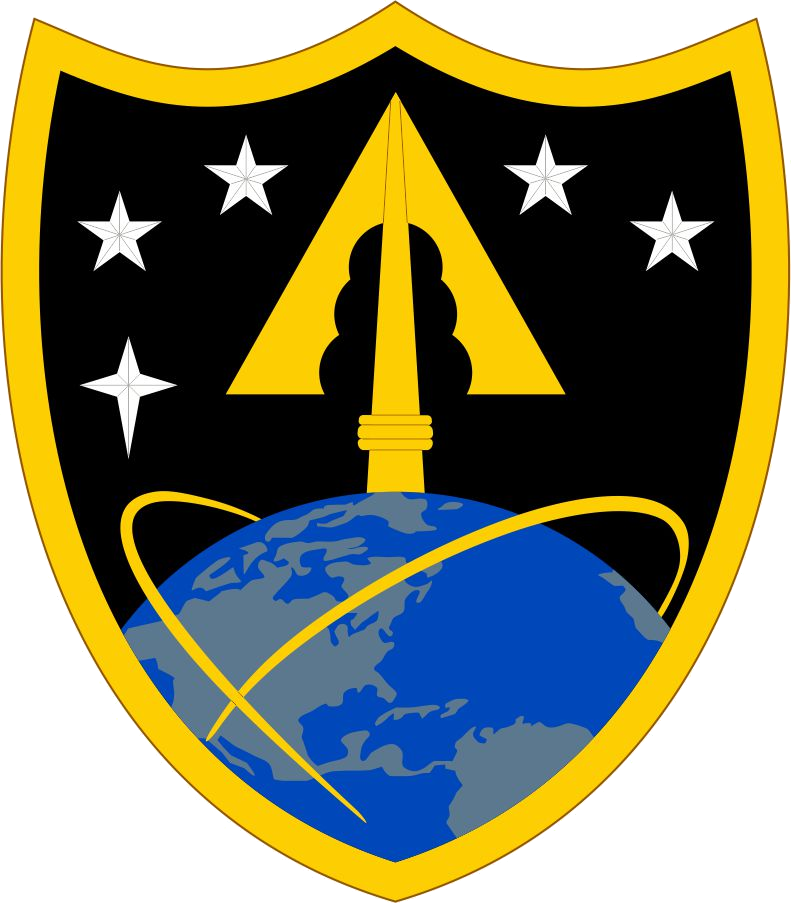
Shoulder Sleeve Insignia

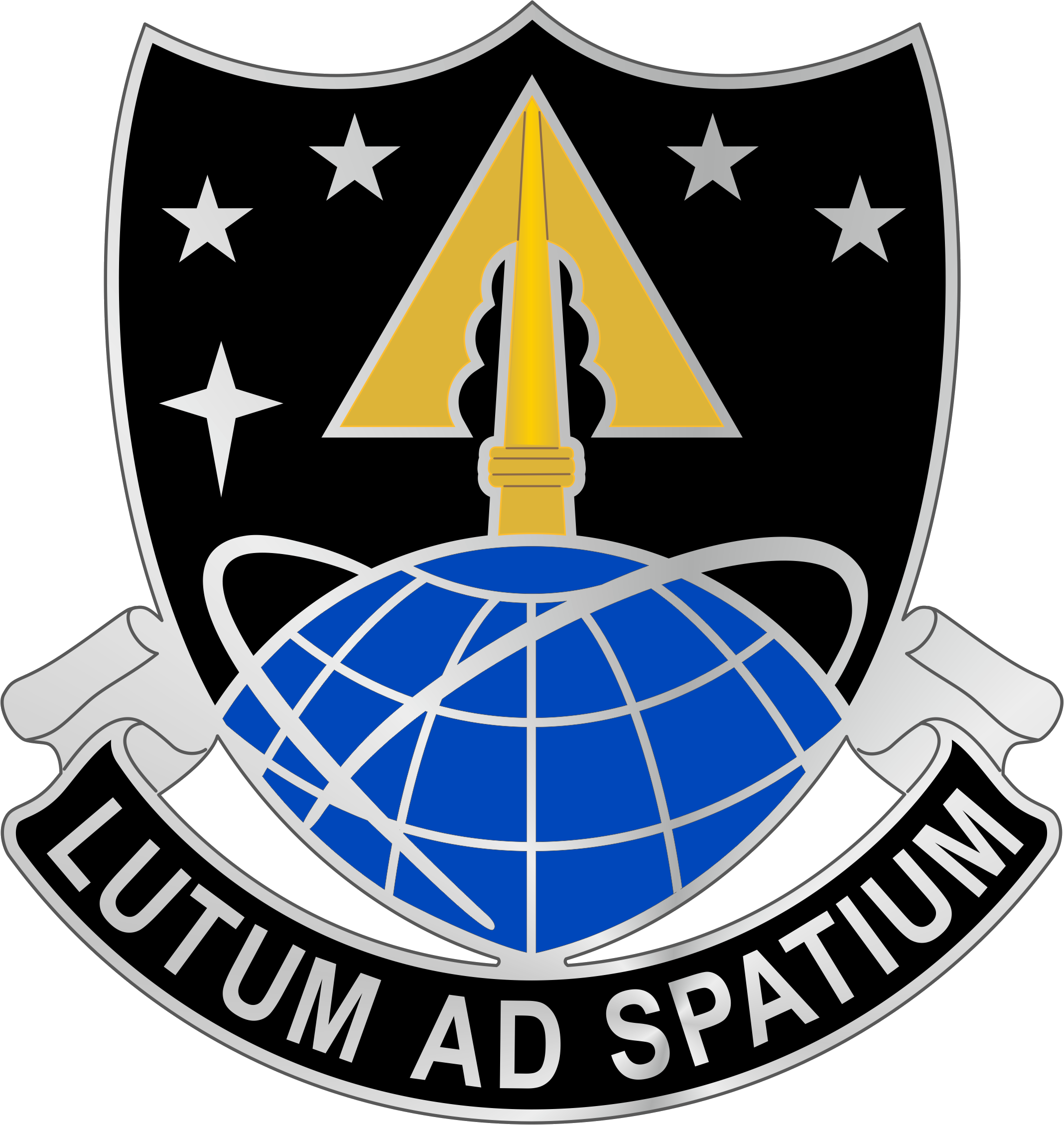
Distinctive Unit Insignia

==== Shoulder sleeve insignia ====
Black and gold together symbolize the United States Army. Black signifies the vast infinity of space and gold denotes high standards for excellence. The demi-globe represents the earth as seen from space and symbolizes the global operations of the command. The crossed orbital rings denote the unity of United States Space Command (USSPACECOM) with joint and combined partners. The rings intersect over the United States, identifying the terrestrial heart of the command. The gold pheon represents the combat power of Army Space. Four stars represent the four-star combatant commander of USSPACECOM. The Polaris star signifies constant presence and vigilance in space now and into the future.

==== Distinctive unit insignia ====
Black and gold together symbolize the United States Army. Black signifies the vast infinity of space and gold denotes high standards for excellence. The demi-globe represents the earth as seen from space and symbolizes the global operations of the command. The crossed orbital rings denote the unity of United States Space Command (USSPACECOM) with joint and combined partners. The gold pheon represents the combat power of Army Space. Four stars represent the four-star combatant commander of USSPACECOM. The Polaris star signifies constant presence and vigilance in space now and into the future. The motto translates to, "MUD TO SPACE."

== Locations ==
Locations in the contiguous United States.

U.S. Space Command locations.

U.S. Space Force Base

U.S. Air Force Base

U.S. Army Base

U.S. Space Command locations
Name	Location	State	Major USSPACECOM unit emblem	Major USSPACECOM unit	Other USSPACECOM units
Buckley Space Force Base	Aurora	Colorado		Joint Overhead Persistent Infrared Center	
Kirtland Air Force Base	Albuquerque	New Mexico		Joint Navigation Warfare Center	
Fort Meade	Fort Meade	Maryland		Navy Space Command	
Peterson Space Force Base	Colorado Springs	Colorado		United States Space Command	Marine Corps Forces Space Command
Redstone Arsenal	Huntsville	Alabama		Army Space and Missile Defense Command	
Schriever Space Force Base	Colorado Springs	Colorado		National Space Defense Center	
Tyndall Air Force Base	Panama City	Florida		Air Forces Space	
Vandenberg Space Force Base	Lompoc	California		United States Space Forces – Space	Combined Space Operations Center
Cheyenne Mountain Space Force Station	Cheyenne Mountain	Colorado		Missile Warning Center	

== List of commanders ==
Note: The numeric order of the commanders was reset due to the second establishment being considered a different command than the first.

No.	Commander		Term			Service branch
No.	Portrait	Name	Took office	Left office	Term length	Service branch
Commander-in-Chief, United States Space Command
1	Robert T. Herres	General; Robert T. Herres	23 September 1985	6 February 1987	1 year, 136 days	U.S. Air Force
2	John L. Piotrowski	General; John L. Piotrowski	6 February 1987	30 March 1990	3 years, 84 days	U.S. Air Force
3	Donald J. Kutyna	General; Donald J. Kutyna	1 April 1990	30 June 1992	2 years, 60 days	U.S. Air Force
4	Chuck Horner	General; Chuck Horner	30 June 1992	13 September 1994	2 years, 75 days	U.S. Air Force
5	Joseph W. Ashy	General; Joseph W. Ashy	13 September 1994	26 August 1996	1 year, 348 days	U.S. Air Force
6	Howell M. Estes III	General; Howell M. Estes III	26 August 1996	14 August 1998	1 year, 353 days	U.S. Air Force
7	Richard B. Myers	General; Richard B. Myers	14 August 1998	22 February 2000	1 year, 192 days	U.S. Air Force
8	Ralph Eberhart	General; Ralph Eberhart	22 February 2000	1 October 2002	2 years, 221 days	U.S. Air Force
Commander, United States Space Command
1	John W. Raymond	General; John W. Raymond	29 August 2019	20 August 2020	357 days	U.S. Space Force
2	James H. Dickinson	General; James H. Dickinson	20 August 2020	10 January 2024	3 years, 143 days	U.S. Army
3	Stephen Whiting	General; Stephen Whiting	10 January 2024	Incumbent	2 years, 122 days	U.S. Space Force

== See also ==
- French Space Command
- United Kingdom Space Command
