= 7217th Air Division =

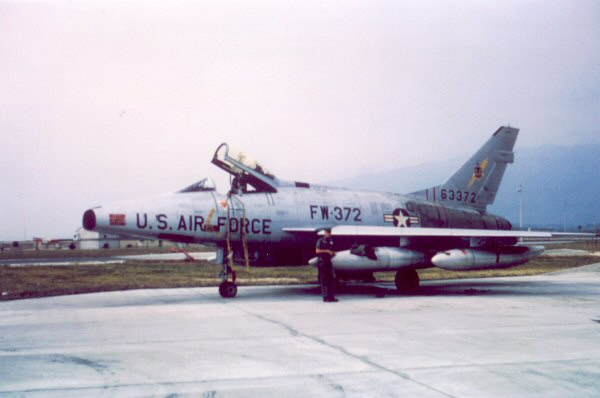
- F-100 Super Sabre of the 352d Tactical Fighter Squadron (Note: Aircraft is North American F-100D-80-NH, serial 56-3372. This plane was shot down in Viet Nam on 30 June 1968. The pilot ejected and was rescued. Baugher, Joe (11 May 2023). "1956 USAF Serial Numbers". Joe Baugher. The 352d first deployed to Adana (Incirlik) Air Base in 1958 and continued to deploy there until 1965.)
- Active: 1959-1970
- Country: United States
- Branch: United States Air Force
- Role: Command of deployed forces
- Motto: Susteneo Vires (Latin for 'I Sustain the Strength')
- Decorations: Air Force Outstanding Unit Award

Insignia
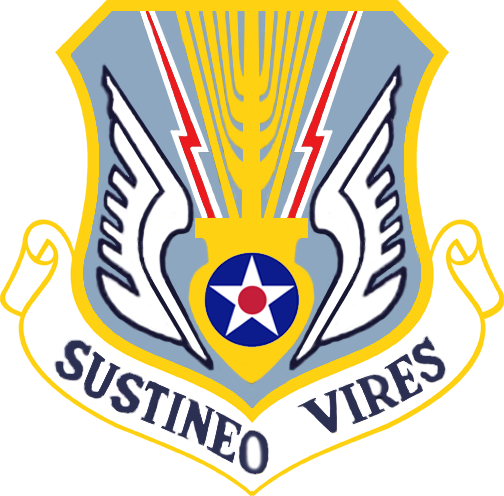
- TUSLOG emblem (Note: Approved 6 October 1960 for TUSLOG. The division did not have an approved emblem.)

The 7217th Air Division is an inactive unit of the United States Air Force. It was assigned to United States Air Forces in Europe at Ankara Air Station, Turkey, where it was inactivated on 9 September 1970.

The division, as The United States Logistics Group (TUSLOG), provided logistical support for all American armed forces, and military activities in Turkey. Its area of responsibility at times extended from the Black Sea to Ethiopia and from Greece to Pakistan.

== History ==
=== Background of TUSLOG ===
Early in the Cold War, the United States established the Joint American Military Mission for Aid to Turkey (later Joint United States Military Mission for Aid to Turkey) in Ankara. The United States Air Force element of this mission was the 1172nd USAF Foreign Missions Squadron, which, starting in 1948, helped to provide the Turkish Air Force with training and aircraft and construction of new airfields.

In April 1953, the Joint Chiefs of Staff assigned responsibility for the logistical support of all U.S. forces in Turkey to United States Air Forces in Europe (USAFE), which initially gave the mission to the 7206th Air Base Squadron at Hellenikon Air Base, Greece. A year later, the 7206th organized its Detachment 1 in Ankara. On 15 May 1955, USAFE activated the 7216th Support Group at Ankara. This unit was referred to as Headquarters The United States Logistics Group (TUSLOG). Later that summer, Detachment 1 of the 7206th was discontinued and replaced by the 7217th Air Base Squadron. In accordance with the wishes of the Turkish Government, US military units and components in Turkey were given "cover" designations as TUSLOG detachments. HQ TUSLOG (the 7217th Support Group) oversaw in Turkey as a whole, while the TUSLOG, Detachment 1 (the 7217th Squadron) handled local logistical support for units in Ankara and on the Black Sea coast. Units that TUSLOG supported that were stationed outside Turkey did not use "cover" designations. In July 1958, HQ TUSLOG was reduced to a liaison office as Detachment 1, Seventeenth Air Force.

=== Establishment of the division ===
The 7217th Air Division was established as a result of the weakness this arrangement demonstrated during the 1958 Lebanon Crisis when the US sent aircraft and troops to Incirlik Air Base, Turkey to support Marines dispatched to Lebanon. In addition, the US Embassy and its agencies were demanding more and more services. As a result, on 7 August 1959, USAFE reversed its position and elevated HQ TUSLOG to be the 7217th Air Division. Although Incirlik had been constructed as a support facility for forward deployed Boeing B-47 Stratojets of Strategic Air Command, by the time the division was formed, its prime mission was supporting rotational fighter units of Tactical Air Command (TAC. In 1963, Cigli Air Base began similar support for TAC fighters.

In 1963 the Secretary of the Air Force visited Turkey and concluded that the separate NATO-CENTO-European Command-USAFE command structure was too cumbersome. As a result, was that in July 1964, TUSLOG took over full responsibility for several functions previously shared with the Joint U.S. Military Mission for Aid to Turkey and other organizations. This led to a decrease in the number of Americans in Ankara, but an increase in the size of TUSLOG.

The 7217th provided facilities and training for rotational tactical fighter squadrons, maintenance for aircraft assigned to Military Aid and Assistance Groups in the Middle East, and logistical support for occasional unscheduled operations. It had support responsibilities not only in Turkey, but also in Greece, Pakistan, Iran, Saudi Arabia, India, Ethiopia, Lebanon and Israel.

By the mid-1960s, demands on the defense budget and manpower by the Vietnam War forced the US to reconsider its military priorities in Turkey. In 1966, Senate majority leader Mike Mansfield began a campaign to unilaterally reduce US troop levels in Europe. Following this, Secretary of Defense Clark Clifford initiated a program for the reduction of costs and forces in Europe in 1968. Although a change in administrations occurred in the same year, this program conformed to the Nixon policy of lowering the profile of American forces abroad.

Consequently, the US began to eliminate or consolidate many of its operations in Turkey. Intelligence sites at Samsun and Trabzon discontinued and the sites were turned over to the Turkish government. In addition, Cigli Air Base was turned over to the Turkish Air Force in 1970. The US continued, however, to fund the maintenance of numerous facilities at that base. Altogether, between 1967 and 1970, the number of Americans in Turkey dropped from 24,000 to 15,000.

=== TUSLOG after the division's inactivation ===
The cutbacks in forces in Turkey naturally had a major effect on TUSLOG. The headquarters in Ankara shrank to a fraction of its former size. On 9 September 1970, the 7217th Air Division was inactivated. The next day, Detachment 1, Headquarters Sixteenth Air Force was organized to absorb its functions and The United States Logistics Group, a named activity, was organized. In June 1972, weapons storage detachments were upgraded to squadron status.

TUSLOG was inactivated on 16 July 1992. Separate munitions support squadrons survived TUSLOG until USAFE announced the closure of weapons sites except at Incirlik Air Base in April 1995.

== Lineage ==
- Established as the 7217 Air Division (Command) and organized on 7 August 1959

Discontinued on 9 September 1970

=== Assignments ===
- Seventeenth Air Force, 7 August 1959
- United States Air Forces in Europe, 15 November 1959 – 9 September 1970

=== Station ===
- Ankara Air Station, Turkey, 15 November 1959 – 9 September 1970

=== TUSLOG Units ===
- Adana (see Incirlik Air Base)
- Ankara Air Station (Note: The 7217th Division had no subordinate tactical units permanently assigned. AFHRA, 7217 Air Division factsheet. Dates reflect assignment to all units using the TUSLOG name from 1955 to 1992.)

7216th Support Group, 15 May 1955 – 1 July 1958 (TUSLOG, Det 10)
7250th Support Squadron (later 7250th Support Group, 7250th Air Base Squadron), 1 April 1956 – 31 March 1973 (TUSLOG, Det 30)
7217th Air Base Group, 15 November 1982 – 16 July 1992

- Balikesir Air Base

7391st Munitions Support Squadron, 1 July 1972 – 16 July 1992 (Note: Munitions support at Balikesir began on 1 October 1966 by Detachment 1, 301st Munitions Maintenance Squadron. Leiser.)

- Cigli Air Base

7266th Support Squadron, 1 July 1959 – 5 July 1962
7231st Air Base Group (later 7231st Combat Support Group), 5 July 1962 – 1 April 1966 (TUSLOG, Det 116)
41st Tactical Group, 1 April 1966 – 9 September 1970 (TUSLOG, Det 116)

- Diyabakir (see Pirinclik Air Base)
- Eskisehir Air Base

7392d Munitions Support Squadron, 1 July 1972 – 30 September 1990 (Note: Munitions support at Balikesir began on 20 March 1962 by Detachment 7, 1st Tactical Depot Squadron. Leiser. The 1st Tactical Depot Squadron was redesignated the 301st Munitions Maintenance Squadron on 1 July 1962. Leiser identifies the detachments as from the "301st Tactical Depot Squadron.")

- Incirlik Air Base

7216th Air Base Squadron (later 7216th Air Base Group, 7216th Combat Support Group), 21 February 1955 – 1 April 1966 (TUSLOG, Det 10)
39th Tactical Group, 1 April 1966 – 9 September 1970 (TUSLOG, Det 10)

- Istanbul

7250th Support Squadron (later 7250th Support Group) (TUSLOG, Det 29)

- Izmir Air Station

7266 Support Squadron, 15 November 1955-1 July 1959
7321st Technical Training Group, 1 October 1960 – 1 February 1961
7207th Combat Support Group, 1 February 1961 – 1962
7241st Support Squadron (later 7241st Air Base Group, 7241st Air Base Squadron), 1 July 1970 – 16 July 1992(TUSLOG, Det 118)

- Karamursel Common Defense Installation

7217th Air Base Squadron, 5 January 1957 – 1961 (TUSLOG, Det 1)
7277th Air Base Group, 1 October 1977 – 30 April 1979 (Note: From 1961 to 1977, the host at Karamursel was a United States Air Force Security Service (USAFSS) unit.)(TUSLOG, Det 94)

- Malatya Erhaç Airport (Note: Munitions support at Erhac began on 1 June 1963 by Detachment 13, 301st Munitions Maintenance Squadron. Leiser.)

7394th Munitions Support Squadron, 1 July 1972 – c. 1985

- Murted

7393d Munitions Support Squadron 1 July 1972 – 16 July 1992 (Note: Munitions support at Murted began on 1 June 1963 by Detachment 33, 7232 Munitions Maintenance Group. Leiser.)

- Pirinclik Air Base (Note: From July 1958 to January 1964, the host was a USAFSS unit.)

7255th Air Base Squadron, June 1955 – July 1958 (TUSLOG, Det 9)
7022d Air Base Squadron, 1 June 1972 – 16 July 1992 (TUSLOG, Det 171)

=== Aircraft ===
- Beechcraft C-12 Huron
- Douglas C-47D Skytrain
- Douglas C-54M Skymaster
- de Haviland Canada L-20 Beaver
- Convair T-29 Flying Classroom
- Lockheed T-33 T-Bird
- Douglas C-118
- Convair C-131 Samaritan

Deployed aircraft

- North American F-100D Super Sabre
- Republic F-105D Thunderchief
- McDonnell F-4 Phantom II
- General Dynamics F-111 Aardvark
- McDonnell F-15 Eagle
- General Dynamics F-16 Fighting Falcon

== Notes ==
Explanatory notes

Citations

== Bibliography ==
Further reading

- Benson, Lawrence R. (1981). A Brief History of U.S. Forces in Turkey, 1947-1981. Ramstein AB, Germany: United States Air Forces in Europe. p. 170. (Secret, declassified 23 July 2008) (Listed in Neufeld, Jacob; Schaffel, Kenneth; Shermer, Anne E. (1981). Guide to Air Force Historical Literature, 1943 – 1983. Washington, DC: United States Air Force.)
- Duke, Simon (1989). U.S. Military Forces and Installations in Europe. New York, NY: Oxford University Press. ISBN 9780198291329. Archived from the original on 9 October 2008.
