= Sixteenth Air Force =

US Air Force information warfare organization

Sixteenth Air Force (Air Forces Cyber)
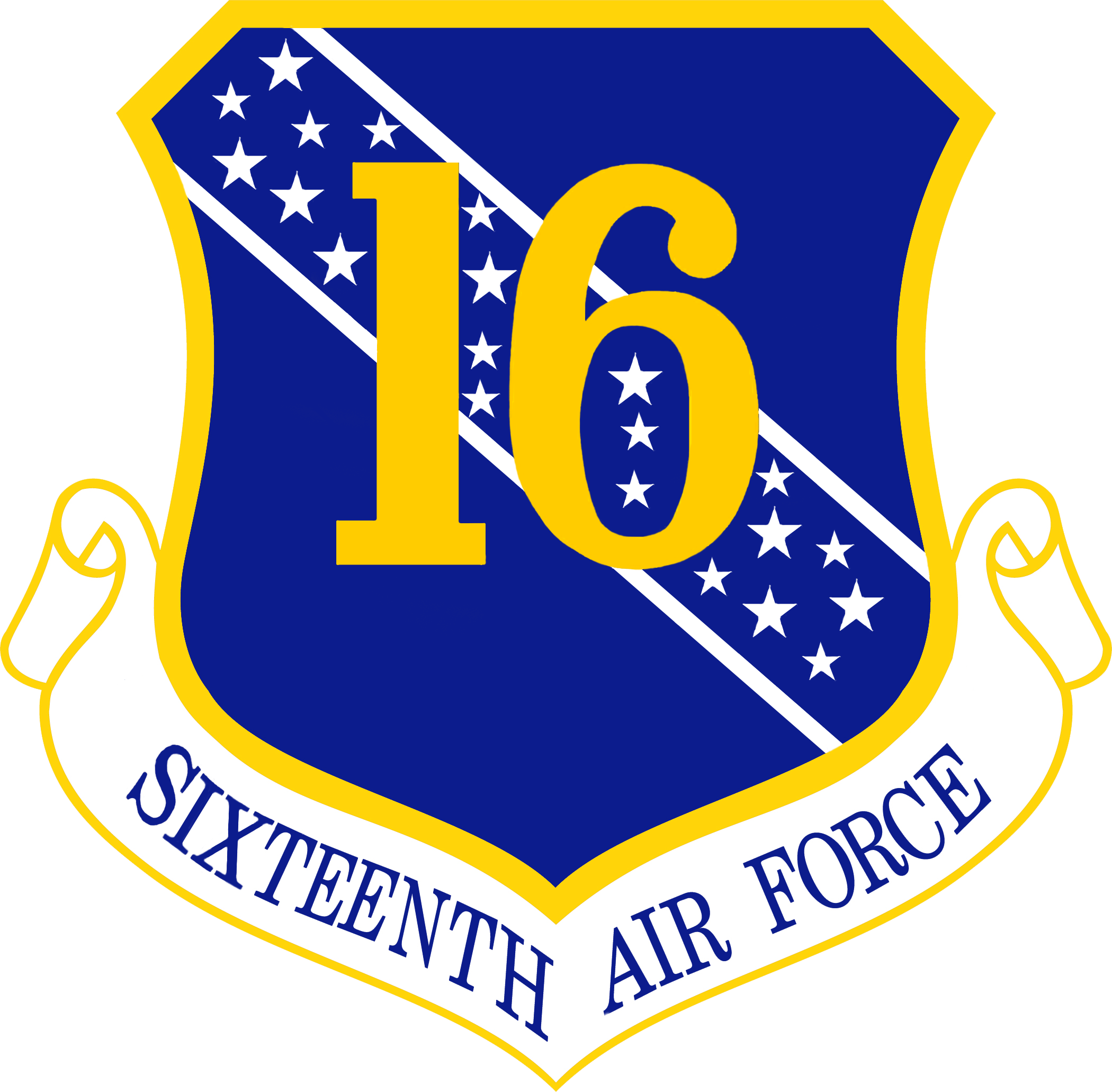
- Shield of the Sixteenth Air Force
- Active: 1954–2006; 2006–2008; 2019–present
- Country: United States
- Branch: United States Air Force
- Type: Numbered Air Force
- Role: Cyber warfare; Electronic warfare; Information operations; Intelligence, surveillance and reconnaissance
- Part of: Air Combat Command
- Headquarters: Joint Base San Antonio, Texas, U.S.
- Engagements: Kosovo Campaign

- Decorations: Air Force Outstanding Unit Award (7x)

Commanders
- Commander: Lieutenant General (Lt Gen) Thomas Hensley
- Deputy Commander: Major General (Maj Gen) Larry R. Broadwell
- Command Chief: Command Chief Master Sergeant (CMSgt) Andrew J. McKendree
- Notable commanders: Maj Gen Winfield S. Harpe

Insignia
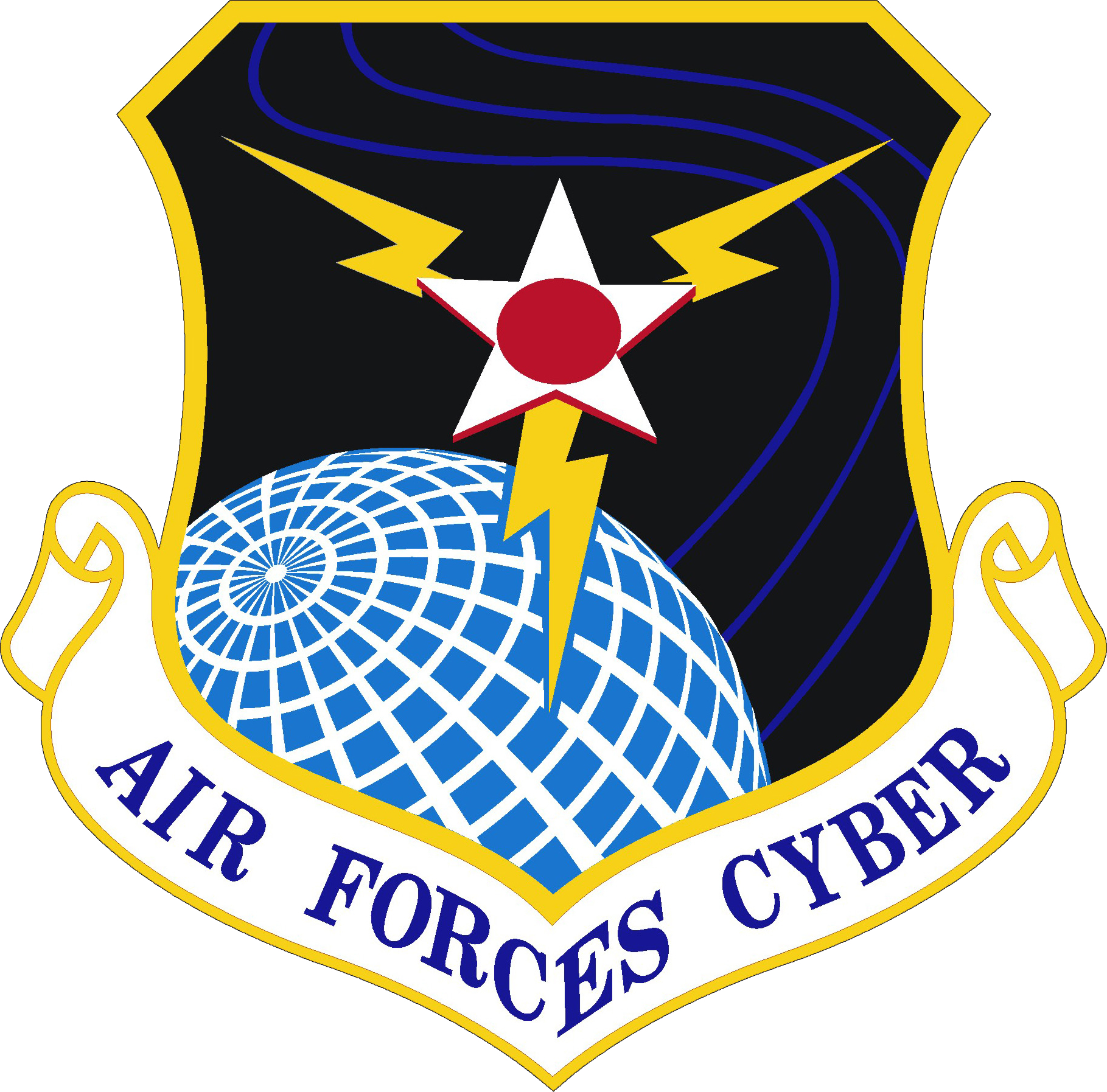
- Shield of Air Forces Cyber

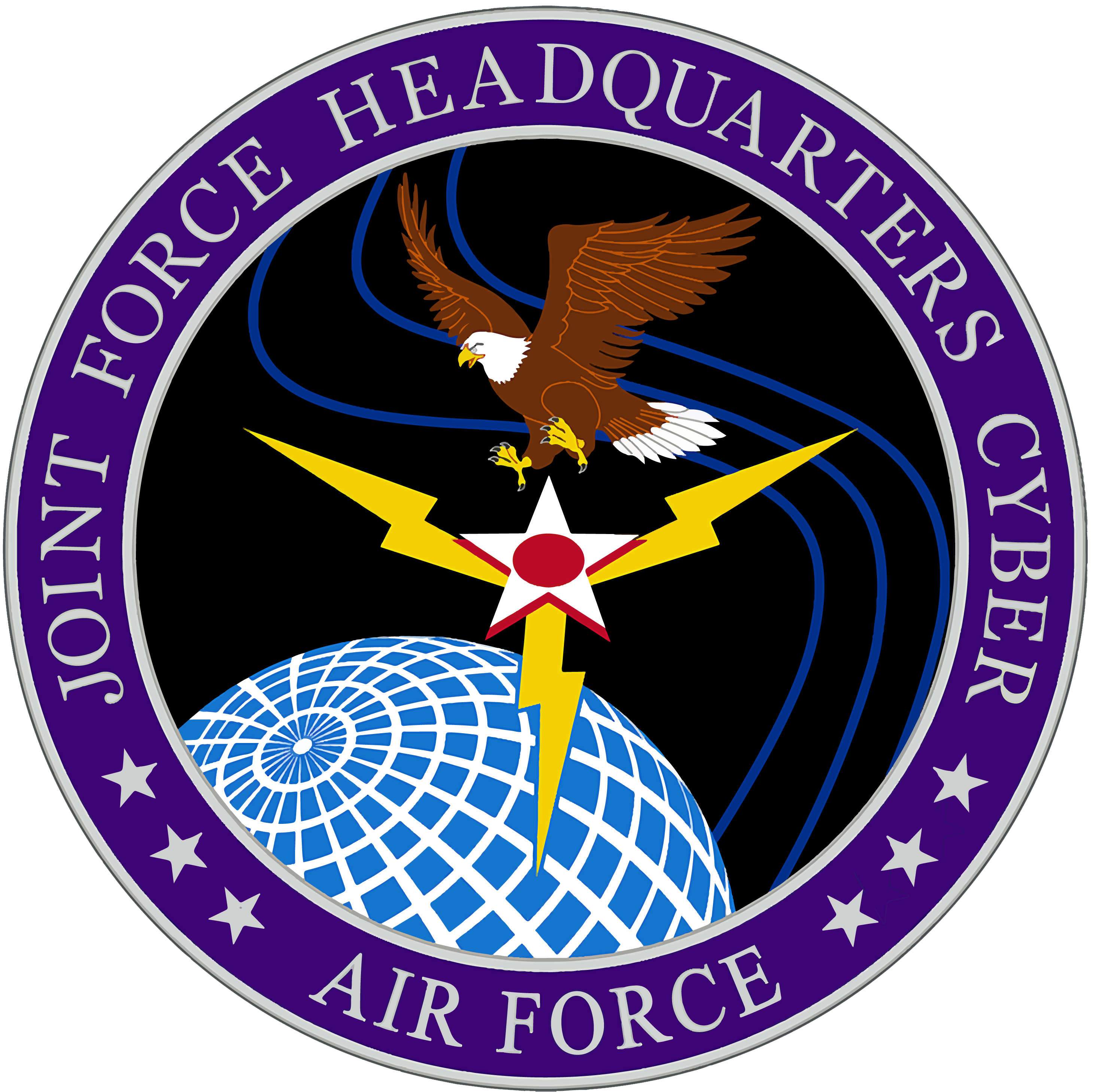
- Joint Force Headquarters – Cyber (Air Force)

The Sixteenth Air Force (Air Forces Cyber) (16 AF) is a United States Air Force (USAF) organization responsible for information warfare, which encompasses intelligence gathering and analysis, surveillance, reconnaissance, cyber warfare and electronic warfare operations. Its headquarters is at Joint Base San Antonio-Lackland (JBSA) in Texas.

The organization was the first newly established Numbered Air Force (NAF) by the USAF after World War II. It was activated in 1954 as a Joint Military Group to provide command and control of USAF activities in Spain, being designated a NAF in 1956. In 1957, the 16 AF was realigned under Strategic Air Command (SAC) to provide command and control of SAC bases and B-47 Stratojet rotational units assigned and deployed to Spain and Morocco.

In 1966, after SAC withdrew its forces from Europe, the 16 AF became part of the United States Air Forces in Europe, providing command and control of USAFE forces initially in Spain and North Africa, and later in Italy and Turkey until 2006. It later became a provisional Air Expeditionary Task Force under USAFE as part of the global war on terrorism.

== Mission ==
The 16 AF provides global intelligence, surveillance and reconnaissance, cyber and electronic warfare, and information operations, and serves as the Service Cryptologic Component responsible to the National Security Agency/Central Security Service and the Service Cyber Component responsible to United States Cyber Command.

== Component units ==
The following units are subordinate to the 16AF.

=== Wings ===
- 9th Reconnaissance Wing (Beale AFB, California)

Aircraft Assigned: RQ-4 Global Hawk, RQ-180, T-38A Talon, U-2S Dragon Lady

- 55th Wing (Offut AFB, Nebraska)

Aircraft Assigned: OC-135B Open Skies, RC-135 Rivet Joint, TC-135W, WC-135R Constant Phoenix, RC-135 COBRA BALL, RC-135 COMBAT SENT, EC-130H COMPASS CALL

- 67th Cyberspace Wing (JBSA, Texas)
- 70th Intelligence, Surveillance, and Reconnaissance (ISR) Wing (Fort George G. Meade, Maryland)
- 319th Reconnaissance Wing (Grand Forks AFB, North Dakota)

Aircraft Assigned: RQ-4 Global Hawk

- 363rd ISR Wing (Joint Base Langley-Eustis (JBL), Virginia)
- 480th ISR Wing (JBL, Virginia)
- 557th Weather Wing (Offutt AFB, Nebraska)
- 688th Cyberspace Wing (Kelly Field Annex, JBSA, Texas)

=== Organizations ===
- 616th Operations Center (JBSA, Texas)
- Air Force Technical Applications Center (Patrick Space Force Base, Florida)

== History ==
The 16 AF's original ancestor was the Joint United States Military Group, Air Administration (Spain), which was established on 20 May 1954. It was attached to the Joint U.S. Military Group, which oversaw implementation of the 1953 Spanish-American Defense Cooperation Agreement.

On 15 July 1956, the 16 AF was created when the Air Administration (Spain) was re-designated as Headquarters, 16 AF, and aligned directly under Headquarters, U.S. Air Force. Existing Spanish Air Force bases near Madrid, Sevilla, and Zaragoza were expanded to accommodate the 16 AF. On 1 July 1957, the 16 AF was transferred to Strategic Air Command (SAC). Its main operating bases in Spain were used for SAC B-47 Stratojet rotational alert aircraft until April 1965.

The 16 AF also operated SAC bases in Morocco from 1958 through 1963. They included Nouasseur Air Base, Ben Guerir Air Base, and Rabat-Sale. In 1966, a year after SAC withdrew its B-47 alert force from Spain, the 16 AF was reassigned to U.S. Air Forces in Europe. The 401st Tactical Fighter Wing, with three squadrons of F-100D Super Sabres, moved from the United States to Torrejon Air Base, Spain. The wing later converted to F-4 Phantom IIs, and in 1983, to F-16 Fighting Falcons.

In 1961, General David Wade was dispatched to Torrejón, where he took command of SAC's 16th Air Expeditionary Task Force. He received his promotion to lieutenant general on 1 August 1963 and left Torrejón to assume command of SAC's Second Air Force with headquarters then at Barksdale Air Force Base in Bossier City, Louisiana.

=== Structure in 1989 ===
At the end of the Cold War, the 16 AF consisted of the following units:

- Sixteenth Air Force, at Torrejón Air Base, Spain
  - 401st Tactical Fighter Wing, at Torrejón Air Base
    - 612th Tactical Fighter Squadron, with 24x F-16C Block 30 Falcon
    - 613th Tactical Fighter Squadron, with 24x F-16C Block 30 Falcon
    - 614th Tactical Fighter Squadron, with 24x F-16C Block 30 Falcon
    - Detachment 1, AFSOUTH, Naples, Italy. This detachment collected NATO data from AIRSOUTH/DEPCINCUSAFE-SOUTHERN AREA, a dual-hatted position, and provided the information to 16 AF. The Detachment also provided a U.S. liaison for wartime exercises, at PROTO.
    - Detachment 2, at Morón Air Base, Spain
  - 406th Tactical Fighter Training Wing, at Zaragoza Air Base, Spain, supporting squadrons training at the Bardenas Reales Air-to-Ground Range
  - 487th Tactical Missile Wing, at Comiso Air Base, Italy
    - 302d Tactical Missile Squadron, with 112x BGM-109G Ground Launched Cruise Missiles
  - 40th Tactical Group, at Aviano Air Base, Italy, supporting squadrons training at the Maniago Air-to-Ground Range
    - 7401st Munitions Support Squadron, at Rimini Air Base, Italy
    - 7402d Munitions Support Squadron, at Ghedi Air Base, Italy
  - The United States Logistics Group (TUSLOG), at Ankara Air Station, Turkey
    - 39th Tactical Group, at Incirlik Air Base, Turkey
    - 7217th Air Base Group, at Ankara Air Station
    - 7241st Air Base Group, at Izmir Air Station
    - 7022d Air Base Squadron, at Pirinçlik Air Station, Turkey
    - 7391st Munitions Support Squadron, at Balıkesir Air Base
    - 7392d Munitions Support Squadron, at Eskisehir Air Base
    - 7393d Munitions Support Squadron, at Murted Air Base
    - 7394th Munitions Support Squadron, at Erhac Air Base
  - 7206th Air Base Group, at Hellenikon Air Base, Greece
    - 7061st Munitions Support Squadron, at Araxos Air Base, Greece
  - 7275th Air Base Group, at San Vito dei Normanni Air Station, Italy
    - 6917th Electronic Security Squadron, operating an AN/FLR-9 Wullenweber radio direction finding antenna array
  - 7276th Air Base Group, at Iraklion Air Station, Crete, Greece
    - 6931st Electronic Security Squadron (SIGINT unit)
  - 7555th Tactical Training Squadron, at Decimomannu Air Base, Italy, supporting squadrons training at the Air Combat Maneuvering and Instrumentation Range (ACMI) to the West of Sardinia
  - 7116th Tactical Control Flight, at Torrejón Air Base
  - 7120th Air Base Flight, at Morón Air Base
Sixteenth Air Force bases and stations in 1989

=== From 1992 ===
The 401st FW moved from Spain to Aviano AB, Italy, in May 1992 and was re-designated as the 31st FW in April 1994. It has two squadrons of F-16Cs. Headquarters, 16 AF moved to Aviano AB in August 1992.

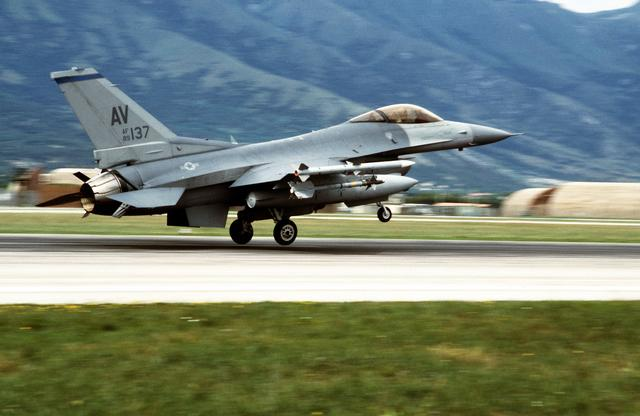
A F-16C Fighting Falcon of the 31st Fighter Wing landing upon returning from an air-strike against the Bosnian Serbs during Operation Deliberate Force in 1995

During its time at Aviano AB, the Sixteenth Air Force (16 AF) was the operational air force for USAF combat operations in the Balkans, supporting Operation Deny Flight, enforcing the U.N. ordered no-fly zone over Bosnia. The 16 AF aircraft participated in the raid on the Bosnian-Serb held airfield at Udbina in November 1994. In the fall of 1995, the 16 AF supported Operation Deliberate Force, the U.N.-sanctioned/NATO executed attacks on Bosnian-Serb forces. In 1995, the 16 AF supported Operation Joint Endeavor, the NATO peacekeeping mission to the former Yugoslavia, through operations in Croatia, Hungary, and Bosnia-Herzegovina.

The years 1996 through 1998 saw continued high operations in the 16 AF. It was the first U.S. Air Force organization to fully employ the Expeditionary Wing concept. The 16th Air and Space Expeditionary Task Force, consisting of the 16th and 31st Air Expeditionary Wings, was activated in support of Operation Joint Guardian and its air component, Operation Deliberate Guard, engaging air power for peace enforcement operations in Bosnia-Herzegovina. The 39th Air and Space Expeditionary Wing was activated in support of Operation Northern Watch, engaging air power to enforce the no-fly zone over northern Iraq.

Headquarters 16 AF formed the joint force air component command for Operation Silver Wake, the evacuation of Americans and allied non-combatants from Albania. The 31st Fighter Wing was the first F-16 Falcon unit to fly combat missions utilizing night vision goggles; wing aircraft provided close air support during Pope John Paul II's historic visit to Sarajevo. Today the wing remains a major participant in support of Balkan air operations. The 39th Wing at Incirlik AB, Turkey, deployed a flying ambulance surgical team to Dhahran Air Base, Saudi Arabia in response to the Khobar Towers bombing. The wing assisted in the evacuation of 6,500 pro-U.S. Kurds from northern Iraq.

Beginning in March 1999, the 16th Air and Space Expeditionary Task Force grew to ten air expeditionary wings and 480 Air Force aircraft in ten countries supporting Operation Allied Force, NATO's air campaign in the former Republic of Yugoslavia. Approximately 13,200 airmen, in addition to 32,000 airmen through Europe, deployed in support of the 78-day air campaign that led to Serbian withdrawal of forces from the province of Kosovo.

In 2005, the 16 AF moved to Ramstein AB, Germany to become USAFE's new Warfighting Headquarters. Its mission was to execute aerospace operations through expeditionary force command and control in support of the U.S. European Command and NATO. Supporting this mission, 16 AF planned and executed combat air operations in southern Europe and portions of the Middle East and northern Africa as an air component or joint task force headquarters. It supported approximately 11,000 Air Force and civilian members at two main operating bases, four support bases and other sites in Spain, France, Germany, Italy, Croatia, Kosovo, Bosnia-Herzegovina, Hungary, Macedonia, Greece, and Turkey, and conducted peacetime engagement throughout the region.

On 1 December 2006, the 16 AF was inactivated at Ramstein AB and simultaneously reconstituted as the Sixteenth Air Expeditionary Task Force (AETF) at Izmir Air Base, Turkey. It was replaced at Ramstein by the Third Air Force.

The 16th AETF was inactivated in April 2008.

=== Information warfare ===
On 11 October 2019, the Sixteenth Air Force (16 AF) was reactivated as the new Information Warfare (IW) Numbered Air Force (NAF), following the merger of the Twenty-Fourth and Twenty-Fifth Air Forces.

Air Combat Command consolidated and inactivated the Twenty-Fourth Air Force and Twenty-Fifth Air Force capabilities into a new organization under a single commander, who is responsible for providing information warfare capabilities to combatant commanders.

== Lineage ==
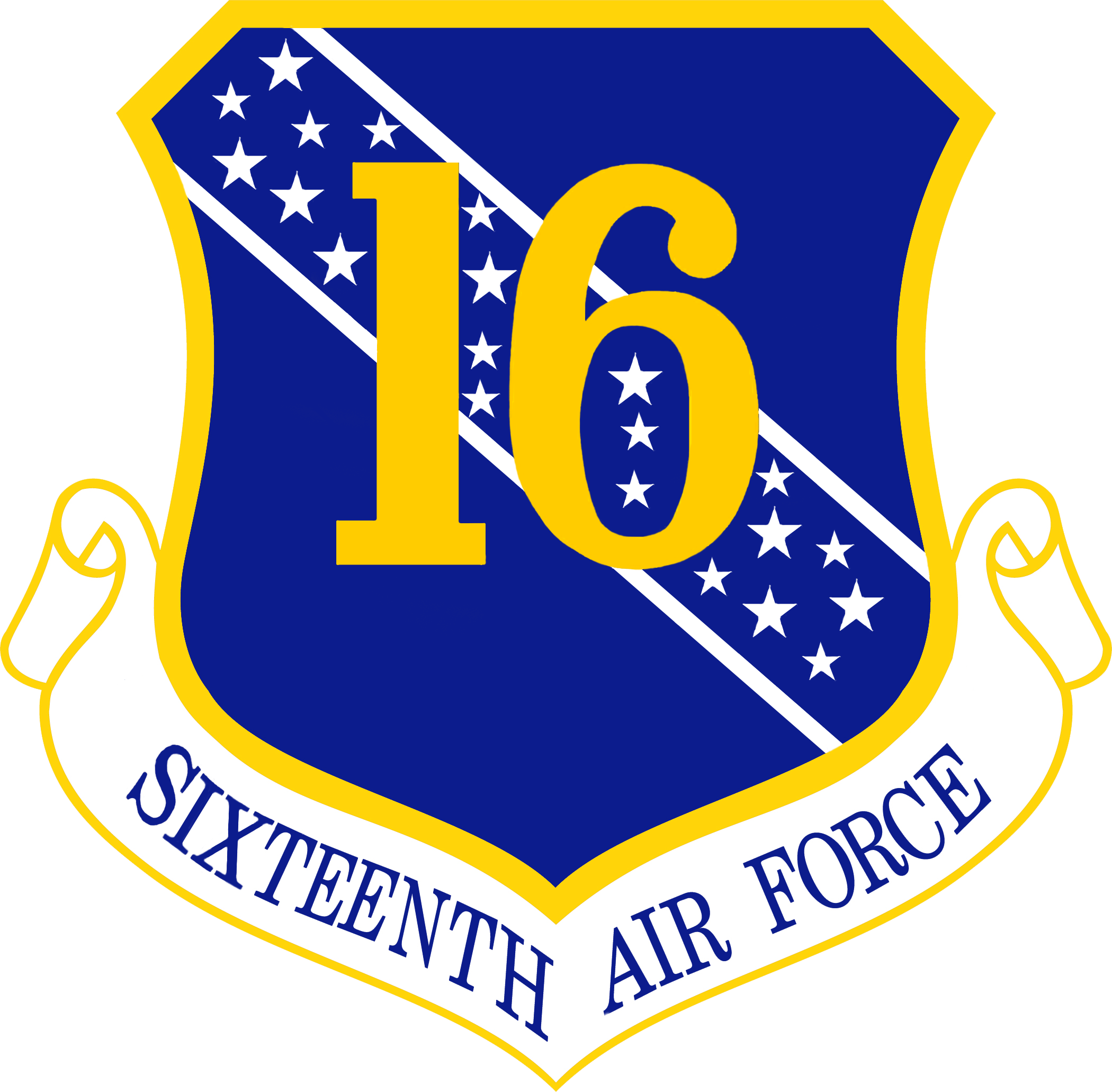
Shield of the Sixteenth Air Force

- Established as the Joint United States Military Group, Air Administration (Spain)

Activated on 20 May 1954 as a separate operating agency of the USAF
Redesignated Sixteenth Air Force on 15 July 1956
Inactivated 29 August 2014

- Redesignated Sixteenth Air Force (Air Forces Cyber) on 30 September 2019

Activated on 11 October 2019

=== Assignments ===
- Headquarters, United States Air Force, 20 May 1954
- Strategic Air Command, 1 July 1957
- United States Air Forces in Europe, 15 April 1966 – 20 August 2014
- Air Combat Command, 11 October 2019

=== Components ===
Air Divisions

- 5th Air Division, 1 July 1957 – 15 January 1958
- 65th Air Division, 8 April 1957 – 1 July 1960
- 4310th Air Division, 15 January 1958 – 15 August 1963
- 7217th Air Division, 23 October 1968 – 9 September 1970

Wings

- 9th Reconnaissance Wing, 11 October 2019 – present
- 31st Fighter Wing, 15 April 1994 – 1 November 2005
- 39th Wing (later 39th Air Base Wing) (see 39th Tactical Group)
- 55th Wing, 11 October 2019 – present
- 67th Cyberspace Wing, 11 October 2019 – present
- 70th Intelligence, Surveillance and Reconnaissance Wing, 11 October 2019 – present
- 323d Air Expeditionary Wing, 14 March – 30 April 2008
- 319th Reconnaissance Wing, 11 October 2019 – present
- 363d Intelligence, Surveillance and Reconnaissance Wing, 11 October 2019 – present
- 401st Tactical Fighter Wing, 27 April 1966 – 1 April 1994
- 406th Tactical Fighter Training Wing, 15 July 1972 – 26 June 1992
- 480th Intelligence, Surveillance and Reconnaissance Wing, 11 October 2019 – present
- 487th Tactical Missile Wing, 1 July 83 – 27 May 91
- 688th Cyberspace Wing, 11 October 2019 – present
- 1989th Communications Wing, 1 October 1990 – 10 August 1992
- 7272d Flying Training Wing, 31 December 1968 – 11 June 1970
- 7602d Support Wing (later 3977th Support Wing, 3977th Support Group), 1 January – 1 July 1960
- Air Force Technical Applications Center, 11 October 2019 – Present

Groups

- 39th Tactical Group (later 39th Wing, 39th Air Base Group, 39th Air Base Wing), 9 September 1970 – 15 October 1991, 7 July 1992 – 1 November 2005
- 406th Tactical Fighter Training Group, 1 July 1970 – 15 July 1972
- 3977th Support Group (see 7602d Support Wing, after 1960)

=== Stations ===
- Madrid, Spain, 20 May 1954
- Torrejon Air Base, Spain, 1 February 1958
- Aviano Air Base, Italy, 10 August 1992 – 1 December 2006
- Ramstein Air Base, Germany, 30 September 2005 – 29 August 2014
- Lackland Air Force Base, Texas, 11 October 2019 – present

== List of Commanders ==
| No. | Commander | | Term | | |
| No. | Portrait | Name | Took office | Left office | Duration |
|---|---|---|---|---|---|
| 1 | Timothy D. Haugh | Lieutenant General; Timothy D. Haugh | 11 October 2019 | 21 July 2022 | 2 years, 283 days |
| 2 | Kevin B. Kennedy | Lieutenant General; Kevin B. Kennedy | 21 July 2022 | 1 August 2024 | 2 years, 11 days |
| 3 | Thomas Hensley | Lieutenant General; Thomas Hensley | 1 August 2024 | Incumbent | 2 years, 111 days |

== See also ==
- List of cyber warfare forces
