= LTAN =

LTAN may refer to:

- Konya Airport (ICAO:LTAN)
- LTA North, a conference of the League of Legends Championship of The Americas, now known as League Championship Series
- Local time of the ascending node, an orbital element
