= David M. Gaedecke =

American Air Force general

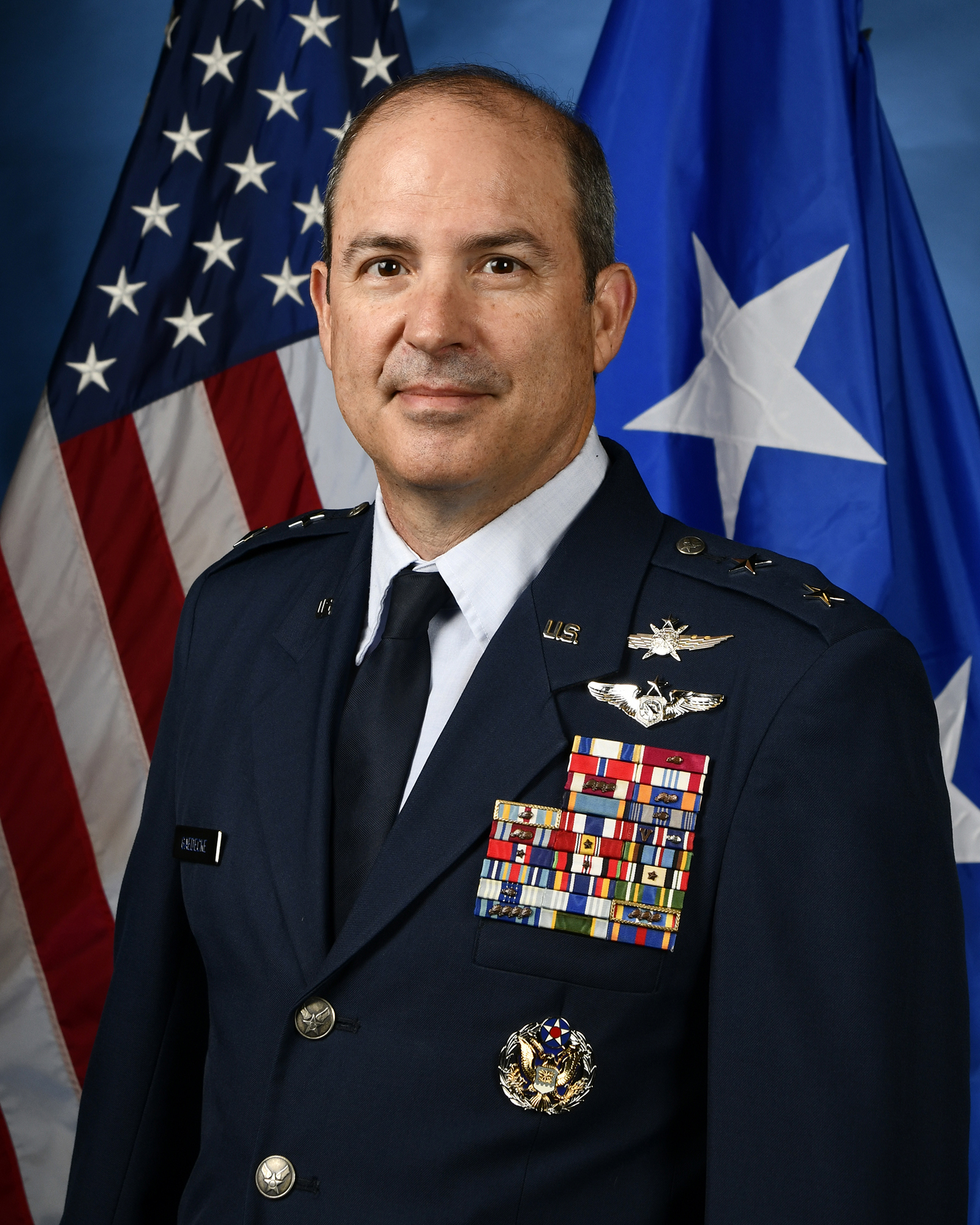
- Allegiance: United States
- Branch: United States Air Force
- Service years: 1993–2023
- Rank: Major General
- Commands: 552nd Air Control Wing; 16th Airborne Command and Control Squadron

David M. Gaedecke is a retired major general in the United States Air Force. He last served as the vice commander of the Sixteenth Air Force.

== Air Force career ==
David M. Gaedecke commissioned in the US Air Force at the Air Force Officer Training School after he graduated with a degree in English from James Madison University. He attended the Undergraduate Weapons Controller Court at Tyndall AFB and became an air battle manager. He was first assigned as a weapons controller at the 621st Air Control Squadron at Osan AB in the Republic of Korea. He then was a member of the 726th Air Control Squadron, first at Shaw AFB and then at Mountain Home AFB. In 1999, he moved to the 964th Airborne Air Control Squadron at Tinker AFB, and began flying on the E-3 AWACS. He later flew on the NATO E-3 AWACS, and then flew on the E-8 JSTARS at Robins AFB. He was the director of operations, and later the commander, of the 16th Airborne Command and Control Squadron. He attended the Joint Advanced Warfighting School at the National Defense University, and served as the directory of the Combat Operations Division at the 609th Air Operations Center at Al Udeid AB in Qatar. He then served as the vice commander of the 505th Command and Control Wing at Hurlburt Field, and then became the commander of the 552nd Air Control Wing in 2015. In 2017, he became the Director of Cyberspace Operations and Warfighter Integration at The Pentagon, and later the director of Electromagnetic Spectrum Superiority. In July 2020, he became the Vice Commander of the Sixteenth Air Force.

== Dates of promotion ==
Insignia	Rank	Date
	Major general	May 7, 2021
	Brigadier general	Nov. 17, 2017
	Colonel	Sept. 1, 2011
	Lieutenant colonel	Sept. 1, 2007
	Major	Mar. 1, 2004
	Captain	Nov. 19, 1997
	First lieutenant	Nov. 19, 1995
	Second lieutenant	Nov. 19, 1993

Military offices
Preceded by Jay R. Bickley	Commander of the 552nd Air Control Wing; 2015–2017	Succeeded by Geoffrey F. Weiss
Preceded by Kevin B. Kennedy Jr.	Director for Cyberspace Operations and Warfighter Communications of the United States Air Force; 2017–2019	Succeeded by Bradley L. Pyburn
New office	Director for Electromagnetic Spectrum Superiority of the United States Air Force; 2019–2020	Succeeded by Michael Manion
Preceded by Michelle L. Hayworth	Vice Commander of the Sixteenth Air Force; 2020–2023	Succeeded by Thomas Hensley
