= Balıkesir Airport =

Military airport in Balıkesir, Turkey

Balıkesir Merkez Airport Balıkesir Merkez Havalimanı
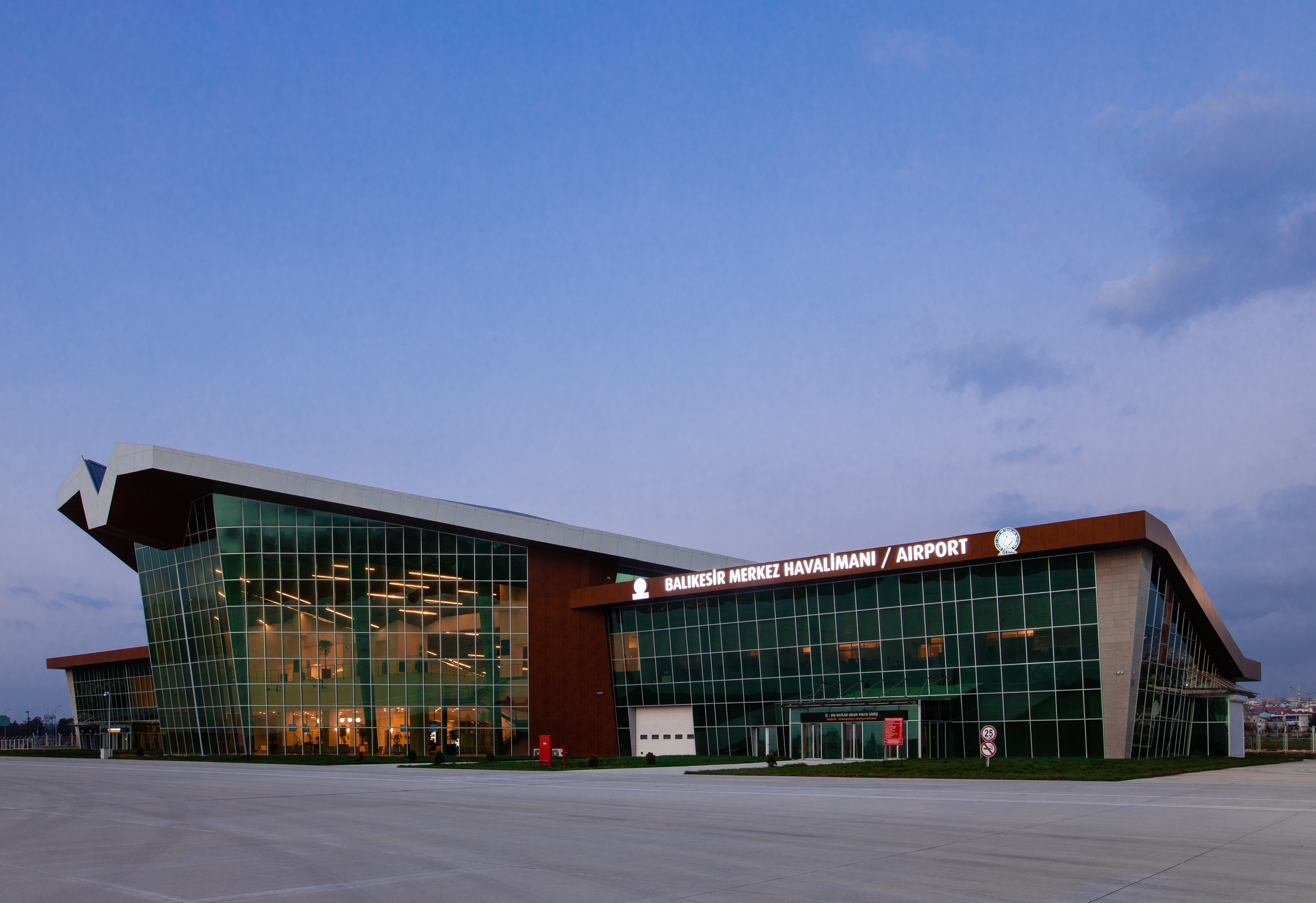
- IATA: BZI; ICAO: LTBF

Summary
- Airport type: Public / military
- Operator: General Directorate of State Airports Authority
- Serves: Balıkesir, Turkey
- Location: Altıeylül, Balıkesir, Turkey
- Opened: 8 December 1998; 27 years ago
- Elevation AMSL: 340 ft (100 m)
- Coordinates: 39°37′10″N 027°55′34″E
- Website: www.dhmi.gov.tr

Map
- Location of airport in Turkey

Runways
Direction	Length		Surface
Direction	m	ft	Surface
18/36	2,990	9,810	Asphalt
- Source: DAFIF

Balıkesir Airport (IATA: BZI, ICAO: LTBF) is a public/military airport in the city center of Balıkesir, Turkey. No available flights operate from the airport. A new terminal building opened in 2020.

== Military usage ==
Balıkesir is home to the 9th Air Wing (Ana Jet Üs or AJÜ) of the 1st Air Force Command (Hava Kuvvet Komutanligi) of the Turkish Air Force (Türk Hava Kuvvetleri). Other wings of this command are located in Eskişehir (LTBI), Konya (LTAN), Ankara Akıncı (LTAE) and Bandırma (LTBG).

TUSLOG Detachment 184 used to be stationed here during the Cold War, supporting any required nuclear strike operations by the 191 and 192 Filos with the Lockheed F-104G/S. Some 25 nuclear weapons were reportedly stored at the base.

== Traffic statistics ==
Balıkesir–Merkez Airport passenger traffic statistics
Year (months)	Domestic	% change	International	% change	Total	% change
2015	286	▼46%	-	-	286	▼46%
2014	534	▼81%	-	-	534	▼81%
2013	2,876	▼75%	-	-	2,876	▼75%
2012	11,573	▲73%	-	-	11,573	▲73%
2011	6,674	-	-	-	6,674	-
2010	-	▼100%	-	-	-	▼100%
2009	256	-	-	-	256	-
2008	-	▼100%	-	-	-	▼100%
2007	1,313	Steady	-	Steady	1,313	Steady

== See also ==
- Balıkesir Koca Seyit Airport, in Balıkesir Province
