= Winfield S. Harpe =

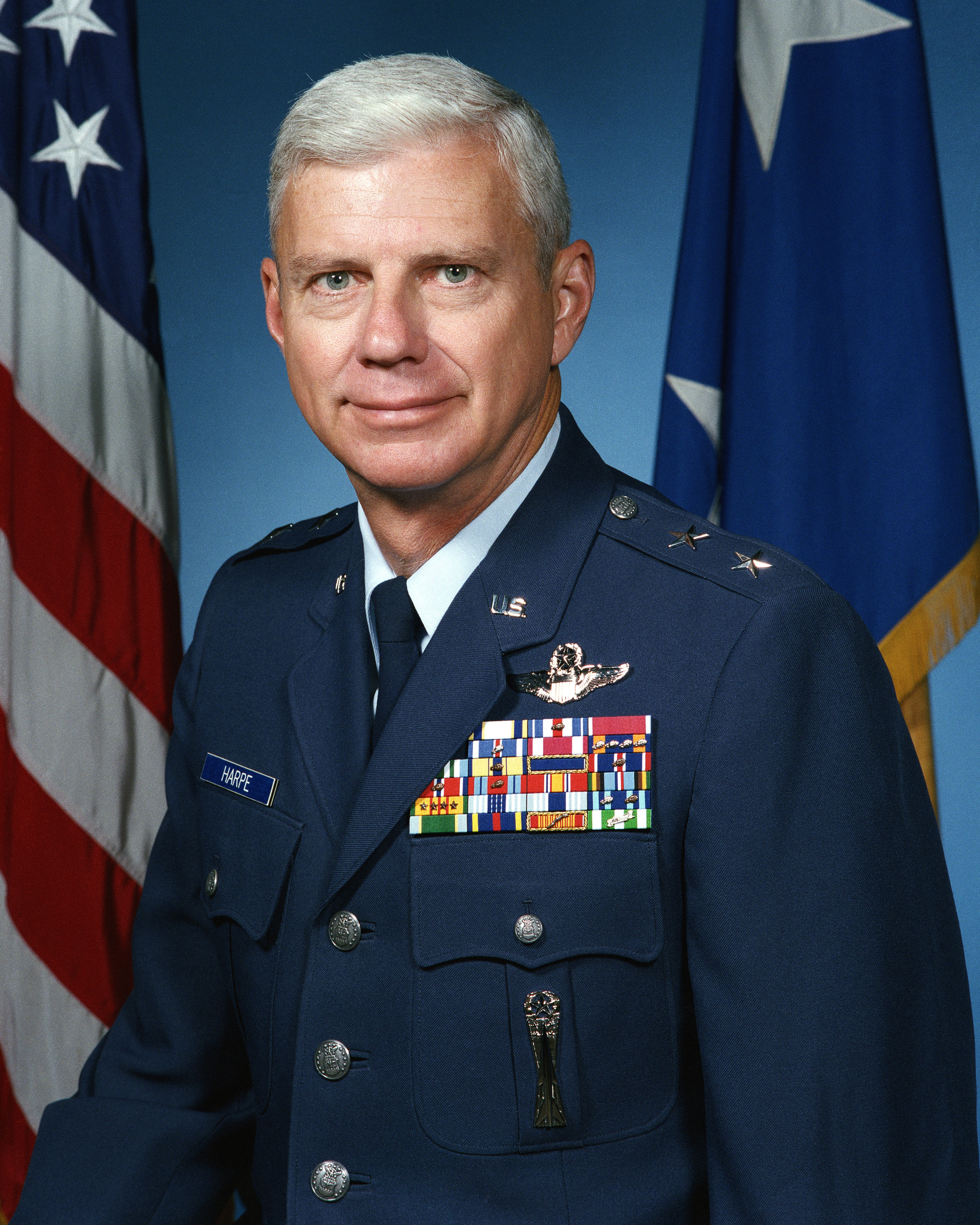
- Born: January 12, 1937; Thomaston, Georgia, United States
- Died: December 5, 1988 (aged 51); Guadalajara, Spain
- Burial place: Arlington National Cemetery
- Military career
- Allegiance: United States
- Branch: United States Air Force
- Service years: 1959–1988
- Rank: Major General
- Commands: Sixteenth Air Force; 14th Flying Training Wing
- Conflicts: Vietnam War
- Awards: Air Force Distinguished Service Medal; Silver Star (2); Legion of Merit; Distinguished Flying Cross (6); Meritorious Service Medal; Air Medal (21); Joint Service Commendation Medal; Air Force Commendation Medal (2)

Winfield Scott Harpe (January 12, 1937 – December 5, 1988) was a United States Air Force officer who served during the Vietnam War and Cold War.

General Harpe died during an attempted forced landing after a technical failure while on a routine training mission outside of Madrid, in Spain.

== Education ==
Harpe was born in 1937, in Thomaston, Georgia, and graduated from Cedartown Georgia High School in 1955. He received a bachelor's degree in economics from Florida State University in 1959 and a master's degree in business administration from Auburn University in 1970. He was a distinguished graduate of Squadron Officer School in 1965, Air Command and Staff College in 1970 and the Air War College in 1978. He also is a 1979 graduate of the Institute for Management, Northwestern University, and a 1983 graduate of the Harvard University School of Government program for senior managers.

== Military career ==
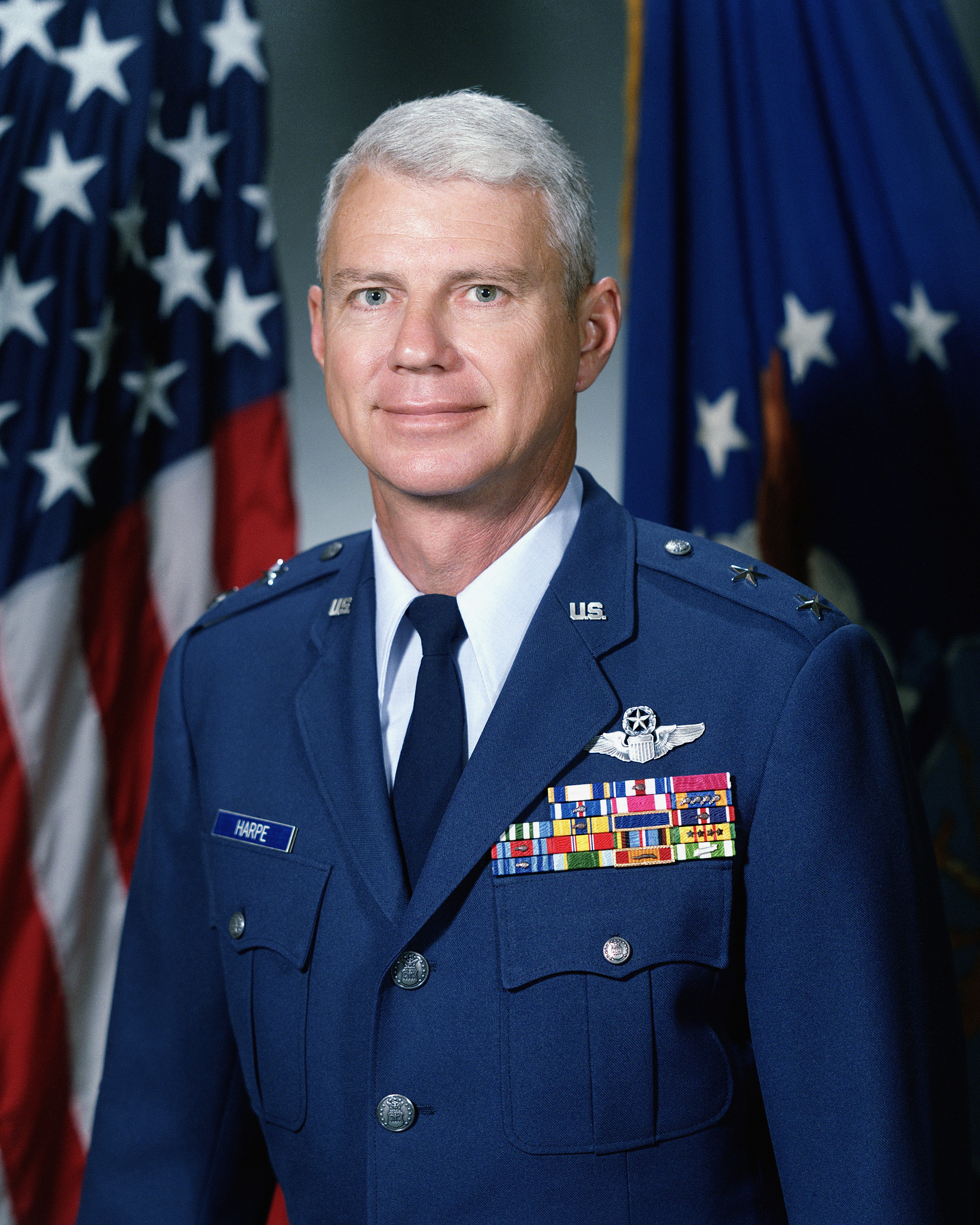
Alternate portrait of Maj Gen Winfield S. Harpe

Harpe was a distinguished graduate of the Reserve Officer Training Corps program and was commissioned as a second lieutenant in July 1959. He attended primary flying training at Malden Air Base, Missouri, and basic flying training at Craig Air Force Base, Alabama, where he earned his wings in September 1960. After initial flying duties in KC-135 Stratotankers at Beale Air Force Base, California, he received transition training to F-105 Thunderchiefs; and earned the outstanding graduate award. Harpe flew fighter aircraft for the remainder of his career.

In 1966 and 1967, during the intensive air campaigns against North Vietnam, Harpe was assigned to the 388th Tactical Fighter Wing at Korat Royal Thai Air Force Base, Thailand, and flew 100 combat missions over North Vietnam. Many of these missions were into the heavily defended Hanoi area. He returned to the United States in September 1967 and was assigned to McConnell Air Force Base, Kansas, as an F-105 instructor pilot with the 23rd Tactical Fighter Wing. While there he trained pilots for F-105 duty in combat, and also served an extended temporary tour of duty flying F-4 Phantom IIs at Davis-Monthan Air Force Base, Arizona.

Harpe then attended Air Command and Staff College, and upon graduation in August 1970, was assigned as the F-86 Sabre adviser to the Royal Thai Air Force at Takhli Royal Thai Air Force Base, Thailand. As the only American military individual at Takhli, he negotiated details of the bed down of a full U.S. Air Force fighter wing at Takhli in 1972 with the Thai military. In addition to F-86s, Harpe flew C-47s, T-28s, T-33s and T-41s during this two-year tour of duty in Thailand.

In August 1972 Harpe was assigned to the 354th Tactical Fighter Wing and received transition training in A-7D Corsair IIs at Myrtle Beach Air Force Base, South Carolina. He then returned with the wing to Thailand for combat operations from Korat Royal Thai Air Force Base. During two extended temporary duty tours there, he flew missions again over Hanoi, North Vietnam, as part of Linebacker II operations, as well as many missions over Cambodia, Laos and the Republic of Vietnam.

In June 1974 Harpe transferred to Randolph Air Force Base, Texas, as assistant for personnel plans, programs and analysis at the Air Force Military Personnel Center. In July 1977 he entered the Air War College and, after graduating in December 1978, assumed command of the 14th Flying Training Wing at Columbus Air Force Base, Mississippi. In addition to training pilots for the U.S. Air Force, Harpe's wing had one of the largest contingents of foreign pilots in training in the United States.

Harpe returned to Randolph Air Force Base in June 1980 and served initially as vice commander of the Air Force Military Personnel Center. In March 1982 he became commander of U.S. Air Force Recruiting Service. He was appointed deputy chief of staff for technical training, Headquarters Air Training Command, also at Randolph, in September 1983. In October 1984 he was assigned as director of personnel programs, Office of the Deputy Chief of Staff, Manpower and Personnel Headquarters U.S. Air Force, Washington, D.C., and in October 1986 became assistant deputy chief of staff for personnel.

In July 1987 Harpe was named commander of Sixteenth Air Force, United States Air Forces in Europe, with headquarters at Torrejón Air Base, Spain. He was responsible for U.S. Air Forces in Spain, Italy, Greece and Turkey.

On 5 December 1988, the Block 30D F-16C Harpe was flying on a training flight, AF serial 86-0316, crashed near Chiloeches, in the Spanish province of Guadalajara, which is close to Torrejón Air Base, outside of Madrid during an attempted forced landing after a technical failure while on a routine training mission. Harpe was killed in the crash. An Air Force spokesman said Harpe was participating in a training mission, flying in formation with three other planes and was near the end of a 90-minute training flight when he crashed.

Harpe was buried in Section 7-A of Arlington National Cemetery, beneath a stone which reads: "A noble man. A knight of the skies."

== Decorations ==
Harpe was a command pilot with more than 5,000 flying hours. His military decorations and awards include the Air Force Distinguished Service Medal, Silver Star with oak leaf cluster, Legion of Merit, Distinguished Flying Cross with five oak leaf clusters, Meritorious Service Medal, Air Medal with 20 oak leaf clusters, Joint Service Commendation Medal and Air Force Commendation Medal with oak leaf cluster.

Harpe was promoted to major general on July 1, 1984, with date of rank October 1, 1980.
