= Thomas Hensley =

U.S. Air Force general officer

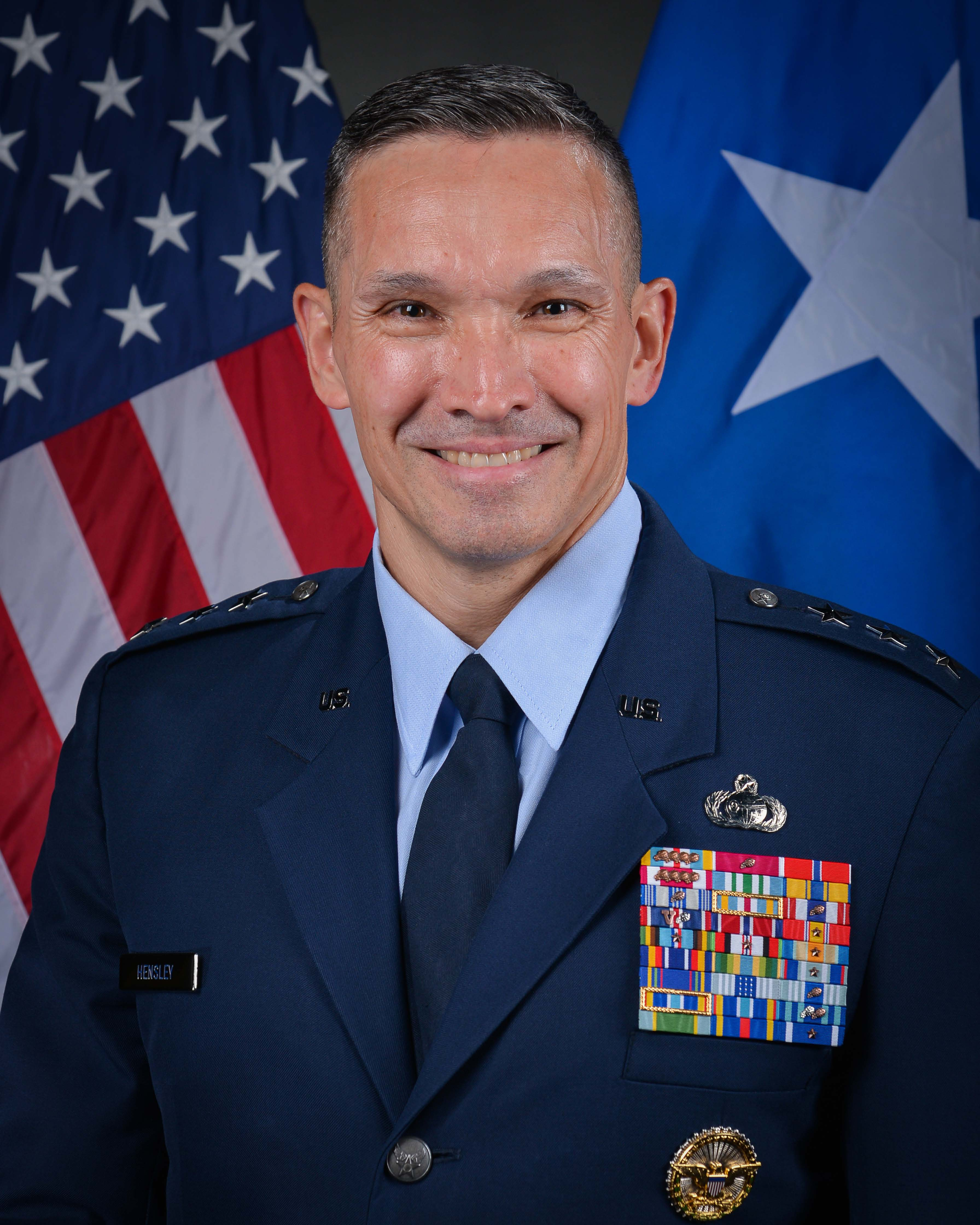
- Official portrait, 2024
- Military career
- Allegiance: United States
- Branch: United States Air Force
- Service years: 1992–present
- Rank: Lieutenant General
- Commands: Sixteenth Air Force; 70th Intelligence, Surveillance and Reconnaissance Wing; 544th Intelligence, Surveillance and Reconnaissance Group; 315th Training Squadron
- Conflicts: War in Afghanistan; Operation Inherent Resolve
- Awards: Defense Distinguished Service Medal (4); Legion of Merit (2); Bronze Star Medal

Thomas K. Hensley is a United States Air Force lieutenant general who has served as commander of the Sixteenth Air Force since 1 August 2024. He most recently served as the vice commander of the Sixteenth Air Force. He previously served as the deputy director of operations for combat support of the National Security Agency.

In May 2024, Hensley was nominated for promotion to lieutenant general and assignment as commander of the Sixteenth Air Force.

Military offices
Preceded by Kevin D. Dixon	Commander of the 70th Intelligence, Surveillance and Reconnaissance Wing; 2015–2017	Succeeded by Matteo Martemucci
Preceded by Leah Lauderback	Senior Military Assistant to the Under Secretary of Defense for Intelligence; 2017–2018	Succeeded by ???
Preceded by Leah Lauderback	Director of Intelligence of Combined Joint Task Force – Operation Inherent Resolve; 2018–2019	Succeeded by Matteo Martemucci
Preceded by Laura A. Potter	Director of Intelligence of the United States European Command; 2019–2021	Succeeded by Timothy D. Brown
Preceded by Ronald C. Copley	Deputy Director of Operations for Combat Support of the National Security Agency; 2021–2023	Succeeded by Ralph R. Smith III
Preceded by David M. Gaedecke	Vice Commander of the Sixteenth Air Force; 2023–2024	Succeeded by Larry R. Broadwell
Preceded by Kevin B. Kennedy	Commander of the Sixteenth Air Force; 2024–present	Incumbent
