= Bandırma Airport =

- IATA: BDM; ICAO: LTBG

Summary
- Airport type: Military / Public
- Owner: Turkish Air Force
- Operator: 6th Air Wing, 1st Air Force Command
- Serves: Bandırma
- Location: Bandırma, Balıkesir, Turkey
- Elevation AMSL: 170 ft (52 m)
- Coordinates: 40°19′04″N 027°58′38″E

Map
- Location of airport in Turkey

Runways
Direction	Length		Surface
Direction	m	ft	Surface
18/36	3,007	9,865	Asphalt
- Source: DAFIF

Bandırma Airport (IATA: BDM, ICAO: LTBG) is a military airbase and public airport located at Bandırma in the Balıkesir Province, Turkey.

Bandırma Airport is home to the 6th Air Wing (Ana Jet Üs or AJÜ) of the 1st Air Force Command (Hava Kuvvet Komutanligi) of the Turkish Air Force (Türk Hava Kuvvetleri). Other wings of this command are located in Eskişehir (LTBI), Konya (LTAN), Ankara Akıncı (LTAE) and Balıkesir (LTBF).
