= General Directorate of Mapping =

The General Directorate of Mapping (Turkish: Harita Genel Müdürlüğü or HGM) is the national mapping agency of Turkey under the Ministry of National Defense and is responsible for the official topographical mapping of the country in both hard-copy and digital forms.

== Function ==
The HGM produces and provides geographic information for defense and development purposes, in addition to planning, standardizing and producing and maintaining geographic materials. The HGM consists of a team of experts and two B200 Beechcraft planes stationed at the Güvercinlik Army Air Base in Ankara. They have the capacity for global aerial coverage are open to any proposals from international bodies in need of their services.

== History ==
=== Early history ===
Turkish mapping dates to the 15th century. Some of the first examples of Turkish mapping include charts drawn by Ibrahim Mursel, and a world chart painted in nine colors on a deer skin by the famous navy commander of the Ottoman Empire, Admiral Piri Reis. A great number of maps can be found dating up to the 19th century which exemplify the historical aspect of Turkish mapping.

=== Mapping Commission ===
The establishment of the "Mapping Commission" in 1895, as a unit subordinate to the Fifth Department of the Turkish General Staff, is accepted as the beginning of modern cartography in Turkey. The Mapping Commission is considered the precursor to the current office, the General Command of Mapping. The Mapping Commission performed its preliminary works in five or six rooms reserved for them on the upper floor of the old Gendarmerie Office.

Since the rapid production of the maps needed urgently for national defense required a larger and more capable organization, the Mapping Commission was arranged on October 28, 1918. The Commission was established as an independent mapping department of the Ministry of National Defense, which by that time had several branches: triangulation, topography, reconnaissance, cartography, central offices, a surveying battalion and a surveying school.

=== Koyunpazari ===
The Mapping Department moved to Ankara from Istanbul after the Turkish War of Independence. It was settled in the Attar Basi Khan in Koyunpazari, which at the time was almost in the center of the city. The printing section also started its work in the same building, which today is the School of Arts in Ulus. In 1924, the Department, which is still inside the General Directorate Garrison, moved to buildings located between the Military Sewing Plant and the General Directorate.

Following this relocation, maps and plans required by governmental bodies, universities, and private companies were produced in line with the changes laid down after the foundation of the new state, the Turkish Republic. After these developments, a need arose for reorganization of the department. Lieut. Gen. M. Sevki (Ölçer), now regarded as the founder of the General Command of Mapping, prepared a bill for the new organization, the General Directorate of Mapping. He sent it to the Ministry of National Defense in early 1925.

=== Legal change ===
According to the legal procedure, following the approval of Ministry of National Defense, the bill was passed to the Prime Ministry to be discussed in the Ministerial Council and presented to the Turkish Grand National Assembly, the body with authority to pass the bill.

As a result, the Law No. 657 was enacted by the parliament on May 2, 1925. This law authorized the re-organization of the Mapping Department under a new name, the "General Directorate of Mapping" reporting to the Ministry of National Defense. The law made the National Mapping Agency responsible for the production of all kinds of maps and plans to meet the requirements of Turkish Armed Forces and all governmental bodies, specifically ministries, universities, private companies and individuals.

=== General Command of Mapping ===
Law No. 657 was amended with Law No. 203 on January 2, 1961. Due to the policies created by the "Inter-Ministerial Commission for Coordinating and Planning of Mapping Affairs" and to the instructions set forth in the by-law for supply and usage of maps and mapping information, the General Directorate of Mapping was renamed in 1983 to the "General Command of Mapping". This change also entitled the HGK to produce maps at scales smaller than 1/5,000. The production of maps at a scale of 1/25,000, which is the base scale, is carried out according to the specifications of NATO standards STANAG, which ensure interoperability among NATO nations.

=== General Directorate of Mapping ===
In 2 July 2018 by a new law, name of the "General Command of Mapping" changed to "General Directorate of Mapping".
