= Kevin B. Kennedy =

U.S. Air Force general

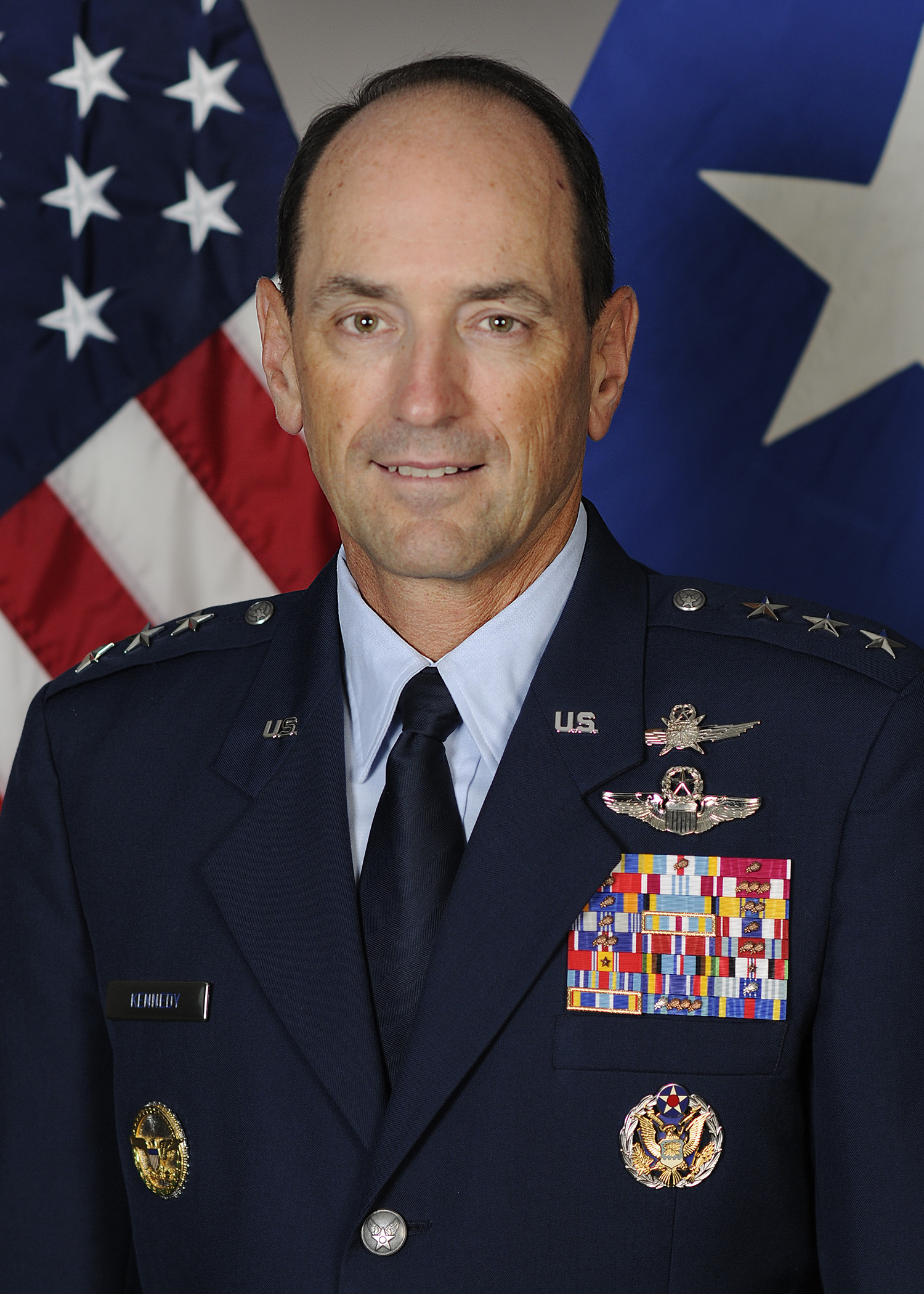
- Official portrait, 2022
- Military career
- Allegiance: United States
- Branch: United States Air Force
- Service years: 1990–2024
- Rank: Lieutenant General
- Commands: Sixteenth Air Force; 28th Bomb Wing
- Conflicts: War in Afghanistan
- Awards: Air Force Distinguished Service Medal; Defense Superior Service Medal (2); Legion of Merit (2); Bronze Star Medal (2)

Kevin B. Kennedy is a retired United States Air Force lieutenant general who last served as commander of the Sixteenth Air Force. He previously served as the director for operations of the United States Cyber Command.

Military offices
| Preceded by Mark E. Weatherington | Commander of the 28th Bomb Wing; 2011–2015 | Succeeded by Gentry W. Boswell |
| Preceded by Brian Killough | Director of Cyberspace Operations and Warfighting Integration of the United States Air Force; 2015–2017 | Succeeded by David M. Gaedecke |
| Preceded by Patrick C. Higby | Director of Cyberspace Strategy and Policy of the United States Air Force; 2018–2019 | Position disestablished |
| New office | Assistant Deputy Chief of Staff for Cyber Effects Operations of the United States Air Force; 2019–2020 | Succeeded by Robert K. Lyman |
| Preceded by Charles L. Moore Jr. | Director for Operations of the United States Cyber Command; 2020–2022 | Succeeded by Ryan M. Janovic |
| Preceded by Timothy D. Haugh | Commander of the Sixteenth Air Force; 2022–2024 | Succeeded by Thomas Hensley |
