= Etimesgut Air Base =

Military aerodrome in Ankara, Turkey

Etimesgut Air Base Etimesgut Hava Üssü
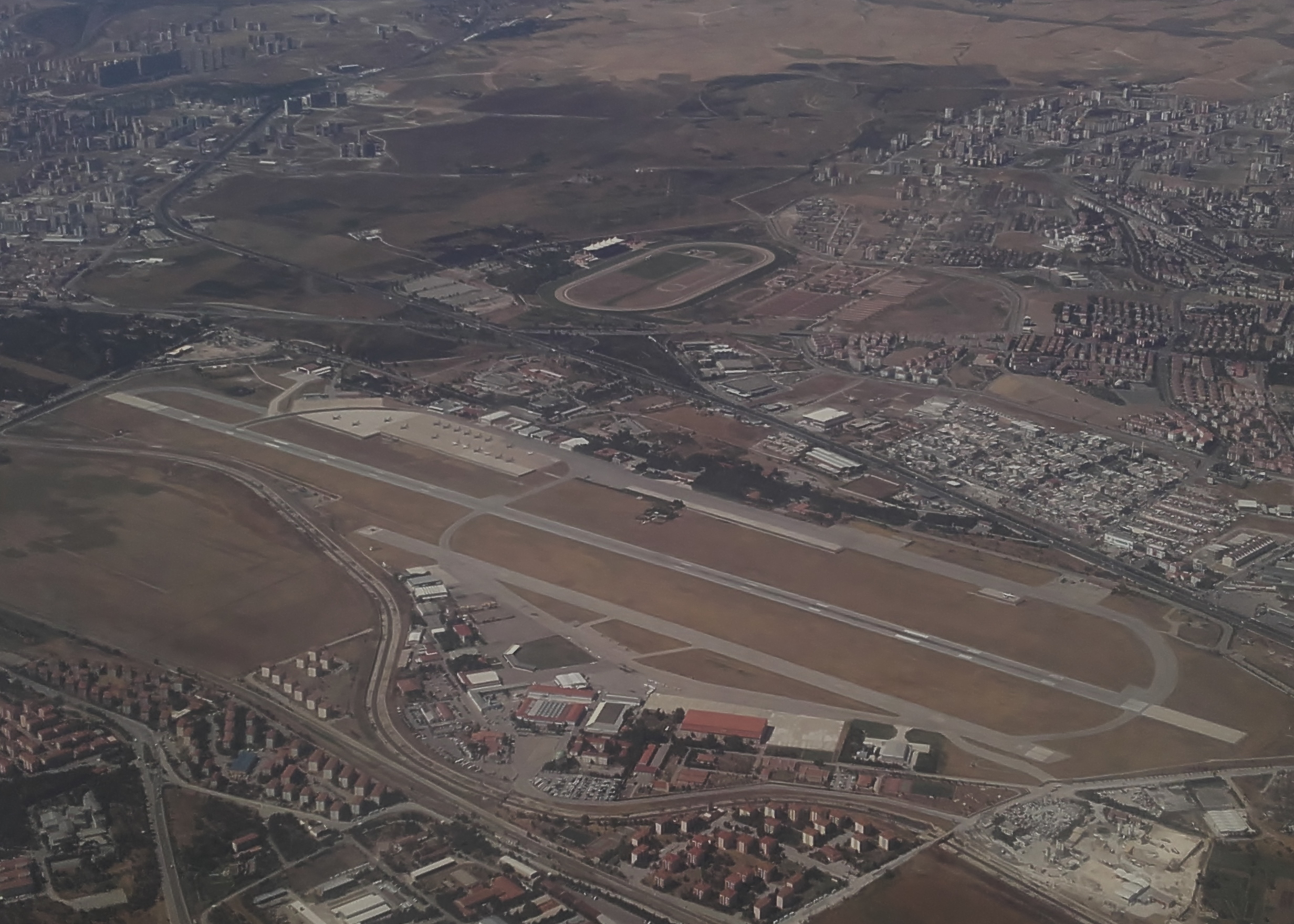
- IATA: ANK; ICAO: LTAD

Summary
- Airport type: Military
- Owner: Turkish Air Force
- Operator: 11th Air Logistics Command; Turkish Aeronautical Association
- Location: Ankara, Turkey
- Elevation AMSL: 2,653 ft / 809 m
- Coordinates: 39°56′59.39″N 032°41′19.04″E

Map
- Location of airport in Turkey Etimesgut (NATO)

Runways
Direction	Length		Surface
Direction	m	ft	Surface
11R/29L	1,509	4,950	Asphalt
11L/29R	2,607	8,554	Asphalt
- Source: DAFIF

Etimesgut Air Base (IATA: ANK, ICAO: LTAD) (Turkish: Etimesgut Hava Üssü), officially Ankara Airport (Turkish: Ankara Havalimanı), is an airbase of the Turkish Air Force located 15 km (9.3 mi) west of Ankara, Turkey. It is owned by Turkish Air Force and jointly operated by the air force and the Turkish Aeronautical Association (Turkish: Türk Hava Kurumu) (THK). International Defense Industry, Aerospace and Maritime Fair (IDEF) and civil aviation airshows are being held at this airport.

The airport has two runway in east–west direction. The northern part of the airport, limited by the urban section of Ankara-Istanbul highway E90 / D.200 at north, is assigned to the military with the longer runway 11L/29R. The southern area and the shorter runway 11R/29L are being used by the THK. The Ankara Aviation Museum, open to public, is located at the northeastern corner of the airport.

== History ==
The airport was expanded for 2026 NATO summit.

== 11th Air Logistics Command ==
The 11th Air Logistics Command, a direct subunit of the General Staff of the Turkish Air Force, is stationed at the Etimesgut Air Base with two squadrons having their military transport aircraft for cargo and personnel.

- 211th Squadron ("Gezgin")

CASA CN-235M-100 airplanes for cargo and ambulance and CASA CN-235EW airplanes for electronic warfare.

- 212th Special Squadron ("Doğan")

Cessna 550, Cessna 650, Gulfstream IV, CASA CN-235M-100 airplanes and Bell UH-1H helicopters for personnel transport.

== Turkish Aeronautical Association ==
The airport hosts the Etimesgut Türkkuşu Training Center of the Turkish Aeronautical Association, which was established on May 3, 1935. The center consists of flight schools, maintenance and logistics facilities and ground support units.

The center flies the aircraft: Antonov An-2, Cessna 402, Cessna 421, Dornier Do 28, Norman NAC6, PZL-Mielec M-18 Dromader and PZL-104 Wilga.

== Other airports in Ankara ==
- Esenboğa International Airport
- Akıncı Air Base
- Güvercinlik Army Air Base
