= Ankara Güvercinlik Army Air Base =

Ankara Güvercinlik Army Air Base Ankara Güvercinlik Kara Hava Üssü
- IATA: none; ICAO: LTAB

Summary
- Airport type: Military/civil
- Owner: Turkish Army
- Operator: General Staff controlled units General Command of Mapping; Army Aviation School; 1st Army Aviation Regiment; Ankara Gendarmerie Aviation Group
- Serves: Ankara, Turkey
- Location: Güvercinlik, Etimesgut, Ankara
- Built: 1933
- In use: 1933-1955 civil 1958-2002 military 2002-present military/civil
- Elevation AMSL: 821 m / 2,694 ft
- Coordinates: 39°56′05.82″N 032°44′26.79″E

Map
- Location of the air base in Turkey LTAB (NATO)

Runways
Direction	Length		Surface
Direction	m	ft	Surface
06/24	2,022	6,635	Asphalt
- Source: DAFIF

Ankara Güvercinlik Army Air Base, (Turkish: Ankara Güvercinlik Kara Hava Üssü) (ICAO: LTAB) is a military airport of the Turkish Army located in Güvercinlik of Etimesgut district, 10 km (6.2 mi) west of Ankara in central Turkey.

The air base hosts General Staff controlled units, General Directorate of Mapping's aviation unit, Army Aviation School, 1st Army Aviation Regiment and Ankara Gendarmerie Aviation Group. The airport is open to general aviation for civil domestic flights with permission.

== History ==
With the foundation of the Turkish State Airlines Enterprise (Turkish: Devlet Hava Yolları İşletmesi) (DHY), the predecessor of the Turkish Airlines (THY), in 1933, regular domestic passenger flights started the same year between Ankara and Istanbul via a stopover in Eskişehir. The airport in Güvercinlik became the first airport of Ankara.

In 1935, a training and a maintenance service center were established by the Turkish Aeronautical Association (Turkish: Türk Hava Kurumu) at the airport. The center, called Türkkuşu (for "Turkish Bird"), carried out revision services to the DHY in two hangars until its relocation to the nearby airport in Etimesgut in 1945.

On February 13, 1947, the first international passenger flight of the DHY departed from the Güvercinlik Airport for Athens via Istanbul.

Güvercinlik Airport served for the city of Ankara 22 years until 1955 when the civil flights were transferred to the newly completed Esenboğa Airport. Maintenance facilities were relocated to Istanbul Yeşilköy Airport the same year.

The Army Aviation School (Kara Havacılık Okulu), which was established in 1948 at the Turkish Army's Artillery School in Polatlı to train pilots and flight equipment technicians for reconnaissance aircraft and helicopters of the army and the gendarmerie, was deployed in 1958 to Güvercinlik Airport.

Following the re-establishment of the aviation branch of the Turkish Navy in 1968, the first naval helicopter pilots were trained by the Army Aviation Command's flight school at the Güvercinlik Army Air Base.

== Legal status ==
Currently, the air base is owned and operated by the Turkish Army. However, the military airport is open to general aviation for non-scheduled civil domestic flights only with permission according to a "Protocol on the Use of Military Airports by Civil Aviation" signed on July 22, 2002, between the Turkish General Staff and the Ministry of Transport. Civil aircraft, foreign flagged or Turkish, may make use of the maintenance facilities at the base with permission. Aircraft with any foreigner crew member, however, need to obtain a special permission to use the facilities. No staying overnight is allowed at the airport.

== Units and equipment stationed ==
Following units and their equipment are stationed at the air base:

- General Staff controlled units
  - Special Aviation Group Command (Özel Hava Grup Komutanlığı)
    S-70A helicopters and CN235-100M transporters
  - GES Aviation Group Command (GES Hava Grup Komutanlığı)
    CN235-100M transporters and UH-1H, Bell 206L helicopters
- General Directorate of Mapping (Harita Genel Müdürlüğü)
  - Mapping Aviation Group (Harita Hava Grubu)
    Beech B200 aircraft
- Army Aviation School Command (K.K. Havacılık Okulu Komutanlığı)
  - Attack Helicopter Squadron (Taarruz Helikopter Taburu)
    - 1st Flight (1. Filo)
      Bell AH-1
    - 2nd Flight (2. Filo)
      Bell AH-1P, Bell TAH-1P Trainer
  - Helicopter Squadron (Helikopter Taburu)
    - 1st Flight (1.Bölük)
      Bell UH-1
    - 2nd Flight (2.Bölük)
      S-70A
  - Air Transport Group (Hava Ulaştırma Grubu)
    Beech B200, 421C Golden Eagle/Executive Commuter aircraft and UH-1H, Eurocopter AS 532 UL Cougar helicopters
  - Instruction Flight Command (Kurs Bölük Komutanlığı)
    - Basic Flying Instruction-Rotating (Temel Uçuş Hareketli)
      Augusta Bell 206R helicopters
    - Instrumental Flight Instruction (Aletli Uçus Eğitim)
      Cessna T-41D to be replaced by Cessna T182T Skylane, Beechcraft T-42A aircraft
    - Tactical Flying, Shooting and Instruction Departments (Taktik Uçuş, Atış ve Eğitim Bölümleri)
      Agusta Bell AB 204B, Bell UH-1H, Bell OH-58A Kiowa helicopters and Cessna U-17B aircraft
  - 5th Main Maintenance Center (5. Ana Bakım Merkezi)
- 1st Army Aviation Regiment (1. Kara Havacılık Alayı)
  - Air Transport Group (Hava Ulaştırma Grubu)
    Beriev Be-200 amphibious aircraft, 421C Golden Eagle/Executive Commuter aircraft and Bell UH-1H, Aerospatiale AS 532-VIP, Aerospatiale AS 532UL Cougar helicopters
- Ankara Gendarmerie Aviation Group Command (Ankara Jandarma Hava Grup Komutanlığı)
  - Headquarter (Karargah Kıtaatı)
    Cessna 182P Skylane aircraft and S-70A-17 helicopters
  - 1st Helicopter Flight (1. Helikopter Filo)
    Augusta Bell AB 205 and S-70A-17
  - 2nd Helicopter Flight (2. Helikopter Filo)
    Mil Mi-17-1V (VIP, gunship and transport)

== 1993 airplane crash ==
Chief of the Gendarmerie, Gen. Eşref Bitlis departed on February 17, 1993, from the Güvercinlik Air Base aboard a Beechcraft B200 for an official trip. The aircraft crashed shortly after take-off. Bitlis, his aide-de-camp, the pilots and a technician were killed.

The pilot, who had VIP green card certification for excellence in flying, had switched the airplanes before the flight after having realized that the cockpit was not in order. The statement of the Chief of the General Staff, Gen. Doğan Güreş, that the accident on that snowy day was caused by atmospheric icing was denied by the crash investigators.

== Other airports in Ankara ==
- Esenboğa International Airport
- Mürted Air Base
- Etimesgut Air Base
