= Konya Airport =

Konya Airport Konya Havalimanı
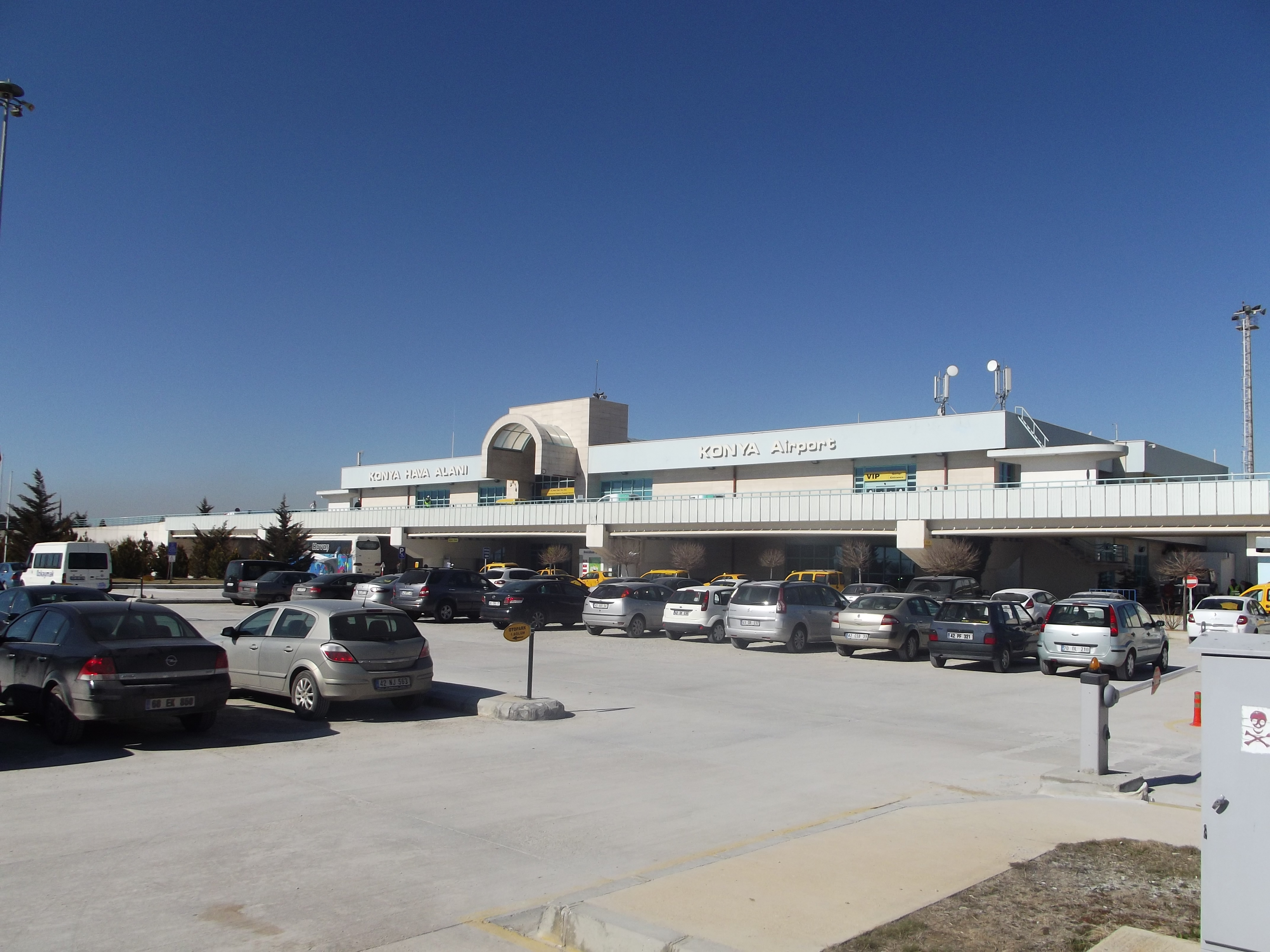
- IATA: KYA; ICAO: LTAN

Summary
- Airport type: Public / military
- Operator: DHMİ (State Airports Administration); Turkish Air Force
- Serves: Konya, Turkey
- Location: Selçuklu, Konya, Turkey
- Opened: 29 October 2000; 25 years ago
- Elevation AMSL: 3,381 ft (1,031 m)
- Coordinates: 37°58′44.40″N 032°33′42.70″E
- Website: konyahavalimani.com

Map
- Location of airport in Turkey KYA (Asia)

Runways
Direction	Length		Surface
Direction	m	ft	Surface
01R/19L	3,350	10,990	Concrete
01L/19R	3,350	10,990	Concrete-asphalt

Statistics (2025)
- Annual passenger capacity: 3,000,000
- Passengers: 970,227
- Passenger change 2024–25: ▲5%
- Aircraft movements: 7,136
- Movements change 2024–25: ▲3%

Konya Airport (Turkish: Konya Havalimanı) (IATA: KYA, ICAO: LTAN) is a joint civil and military international airport in Konya, Turkey. The airport is also used by NATO. Opened to the public in 2000, the airport is 18 km from the city. In 2006, Konya Airport served 2,924 aircraft and 262,561 passengers. The passenger terminal of the airport covers an area of 2,650 m^{2} and has parking for 278 cars.

Konya Airport is home to the 3rd Air Wing (Ana Jet Üssü or AJÜ) of the 1st Air Force Command (Hava Kuvvet Komutanlığı) of the Turkish Air Force (Türk Hava Kuvvetleri). Other wings of this command are located in Eskişehir (LTBI), Ankara Akıncı (LTAE), Bandırma (LTBG) and Balıkesir (LTBF).

== Airlines and destinations ==
The following airlines operate regular scheduled and charter flights at Konya Airport:

Airlines	Destinations
AJet	Istanbul–Sabiha Gökçen; Seasonal: Copenhagen; Seasonal charter: Belgrade
Pegasus Airlines	Istanbul–Sabiha Gökçen; Seasonal: Amsterdam, Copenhagen
SunExpress	Amsterdam, Izmir; Seasonal: Copenhagen, Düsseldorf, Stockholm–Arlanda, Stuttgart
Turkish Airlines	Istanbul

== Traffic statistics ==
Konya Airport passenger traffic statistics
Year (months)	Domestic	% change	International	% change	Total	% change
2025	765,287	▲3%	204,940	▲12%	970,227	▲5%
2024	741,578	▲1%	182,815	▲9%	924,393	▲2%
2023	735,202	▲14%	168,159	▲7%	903,361	▲13%
2022	643,310	▲14%	157,723	▲57%	801,033	▲21%
2021	561,891	▲28%	100,506	▲74%	662,397	▲34%
2020	438,126	▼50%	57,735	▼54%	495,861	▼51%
2019	884,188	▼15%	124,615	▲7%	1,008,803	▼13%
2018	1,044,470	▼8%	116,415	▲9%	1,160,885	▼7%
2017	1,140,421	▲14%	107,284	▲15%	1,247,705	▲14%
2016	1,000,446	▲2%	92,994	▲1%	1,093,330	▲2%
2015	977,369	▲8%	92,274	▲11%	1,069,643	▲8%
2014	906,530	▲18%	82,868	▲20%	989,398	▲18%
2013	767,123	▲30%	68,828	▲0%	835,951	▲27%
2012	590,615	▲11%	68,594	▼3%	659,209	▲10%
2011	530,509	▲6%	70,362	▲51%	600,871	▲10%
2010	499,000	▲87%	46,497	▲36%	545,497	▲81%
2009	267,518	▲16%	34,206	▼4%	301,724	▲13%
2008	230,442	▲7%	35,701	▲7%	266,143	▲7%
2007	214,857	Steady	33,213	Steady	248,070	Steady
