= Eskişehir Air Base =

Eskişehir Air Base Eskişehir Hava Üssü
- IATA: ESK; ICAO: LTBI

Summary
- Airport type: Military
- Owner: Turkish Air Force
- Operator: 1st Air Wing, 1st Air Force Command
- Location: Eskişehir, Turkey
- Elevation AMSL: 2,581 ft (787 m)
- Coordinates: 39°47′02″N 030°34′55″E

Map
- Location of air base in Turkey

Runways
Direction	Length		Surface
Direction	m	ft	Surface
09/27	3,050	10,006	Asphalt
- Source: DAFIF

Eskişehir Air Base (Turkish: Eskişehir Hava Üssü) (IATA: ESK, ICAO: LTBI) is a military airport in the city of Eskişehir, Turkey.

== Military usage ==
Eskişehir Air Base is home to the 1st Air Wing (Ana Jet Üs or AJÜ) of the 1st Air Force Command (Hava Kuvvet Komutanlığı) of the Turkish Air Force (Türk Hava Kuvvetleri). Other wings of this command are located in Konya (LTAN), Ankara Akıncı (LTAE), Bandırma (LTBG) and Balıkesir (LTBF). The 1st Air Wing operates two squadrons (filo) of F-4E Phantoms from this airbase. These are 111 Filo and 112 Filo. 113 Filo, operating RF-4Es, has been disbanded.

== Accidents and incidents ==
- On 1 August 1994, Douglas C-47A 6041 of Turkish Air Force was written off after an accident at Eskişehir Air Base.

== See also ==
- Hasan Polatkan Airport
