= Mürted Airfield Command =

Air base of the Turkish Air Force in Ankara, Turkey

Mürted Airfield Command Mürted Hava Meydan Komutanlığı
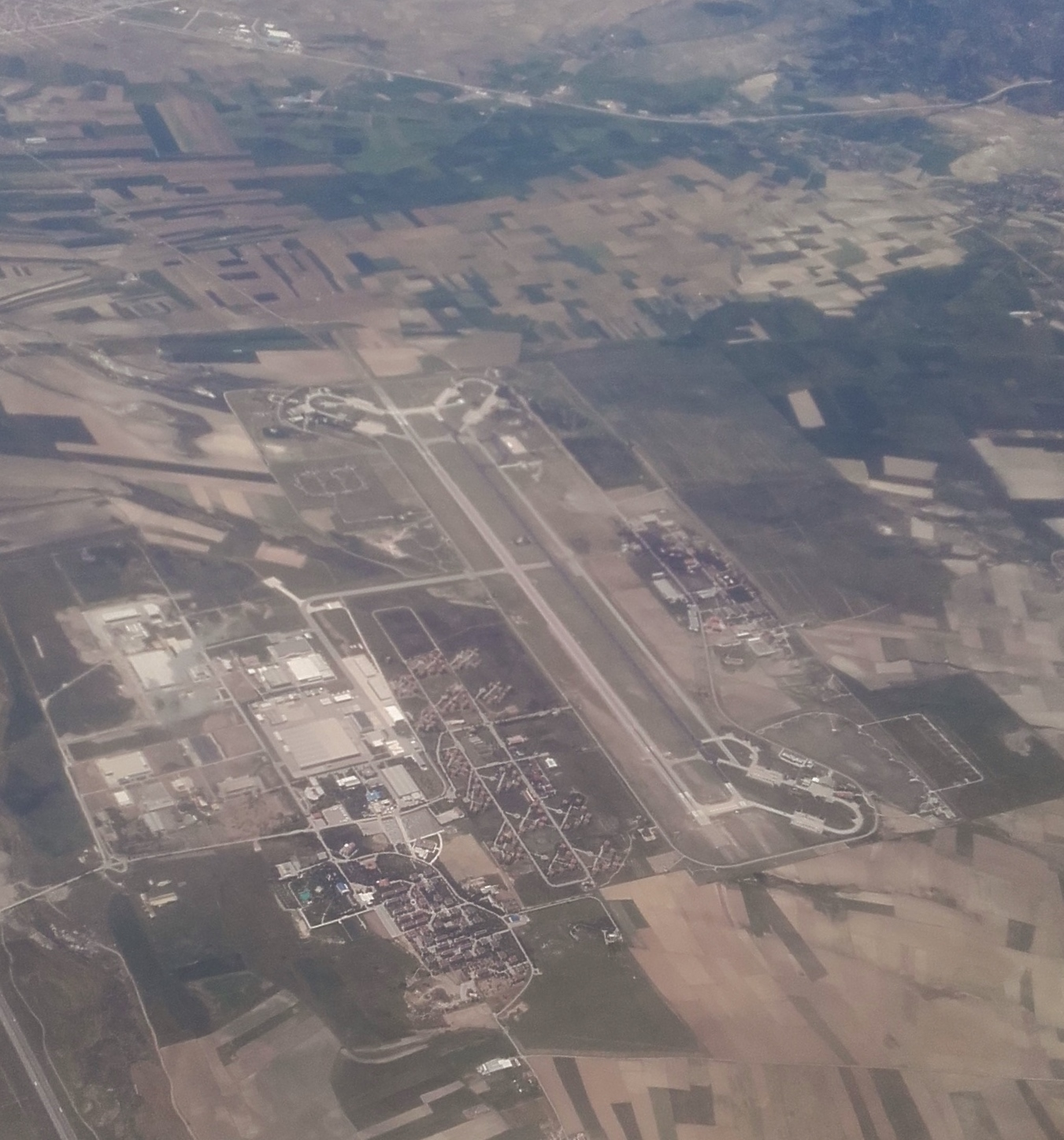
- IATA: none; ICAO: LTAE

Summary
- Airport type: Military
- Owner: Turkish Air Force
- Operator: 1st TuAF Command, 4th Wing
- Location: Ankara, Turkey
- Elevation AMSL: 2,767 ft / 843 m
- Coordinates: 40°04′44″N 032°33′56″E

Map
- Location of airfield in Turkey Mürted Airfield (NATO)

Runways
Direction	Length		Surface
Direction	m	ft	Surface
21/03	3,351	10,992	Asphalt
- Source: DAFIF

Mürted Airfield Command (ICAO: LTAE) (Turkish: Mürted Hava Meydan Komutanlığı, formerly Mürted Air Base, Mürted Hava Üssü (until 1993), Akıncı Air Base, Akıncı Hava Üssü (1993-2016), was an air base of the Turkish Air Force located 35 km (22 mi) northwest of Ankara, Turkey. During the July 2016 coup d'état attempt the air base was used by pro-coup soldiers, and government forces bombed runway thresholds to prevent pro-coup forces from landing or taking off. Following the failed coup, Akıncı Air Base was redesignated with its former name, Mürted, and it was suggested the facility be converted to a memorial or a park.

== Background ==
Initially named "Mürted", Akıncı AFB hosted the 4th Air Wing (Ana Jet Üssü or AJÜ) of the Turkish Air Force's 1st Air Force Command. It was one of the military installations in Turkey allocated to the United States in 1950. It opened in 1960 with the purpose of defending Ankara.

The US Air Force 7393rd Munitions Support Squadron (7393rd MUNSS) was activated as Detachment 33 of the 7232nd Munitions Maintenance Group in Mürted on July 1, 1965. The unit was re-designated as Detachment 8 of the USAF 7250th Support Group on February 1, 1968, which was finally renamed to 7393rd MUNSS on July 1, 1972. Logistical support for the unit came from the US Logistics Group (TUSLOG), headquartered in Ankara. Later on, the munition squadron's name was changed to 739th MUNSS. The detachment 739th MUNSS was part of the nuclear weapons custodian 39th Wing's Logistics Group stationed at Incirlik AFB. On April 25, 1996, the nuclear mission at the Akıncı AFB was deactivated following the end of the Cold War (1947–1991). Today, six Weapons Storage and Security System (WS3) vaults are operational in stand-by status at the air base.

Akıncı Air Base hosted the F-16C/D jet fighters of the 141st (fighter), 142nd (bomber) and 143rd (training) squadrons.

The air squadron, which received the first F-16C/D jet fighters was the training squadron "Öncel". In 1999, the training squadron was re-designated as 143rd squadron, and became part of the Akıncı AFB because other jet fighters at the air base were of the same type, which enabled more efficient maintenance and training.

The air base is currently used by Turkish Aerospace Industries (TAI).

== Coup d'état attempt ==
A coup d'état attempt took place in Turkey on July 15, 2016, which was staged by factions of the armed forces. Turkish Chief of the General Staff Hulusi Akar was taken hostage at the headquarters by the pro-coup soldiers, and transported by helicopter to the Akıncı AFB, where he was detained. As the coup attempt collapsed, he was freed the next morning by special forces.

It is alleged that the Akıncı AFB was the command center of the pro-coup military. At 22:00 hours local time on July 15, 2016, Akın Öztürk, a four-star General in the Turkish Air Force and a member of the Supreme Military Council, who served as the 30th Commander of the Turkish Air Force between 2013 and 2015, reportedly started the coup d'état in Ankara by ordering of F-16 jet fighters of the 141st squadron to take off. The operation was led by Air Pilot Staff Lieutenant colonel Hakan Karakuş, who is the son-in-law of Akın Öztürk. The personnel of the 141st squadron had been sent home in the afternoon with the remark that their duty terminated earlier on that day.

Six F-16 jet fighters involved in the coup were transferred from the 8th Air Wing at Diyarbakır Air Base the day before because of their improved precision night-attack capability at low flight and targeting pods. Two tanker aircraft of type KC-135R flown by the 101st Squadron at İncirlik AFB were employed for aerial refueling so the jet fighters could operate hours nonstop over Ankara. The jet fighters of Akıncı AFB were supported by Sikorsky S-70 and Bell AH-1 Cobra helicopters from the Ankara Güvercinlik Army Air Base. While they were flying low at subsonic speeds and directing air strikes towards governmental targets and civilians, anti-coup jet fighters from other air bases in Turkey took off and chased the pro-coup aircraft. President Recep Tayyip Erdoğan, in his constitutional capacity as the Commander-in-chief of the Turkish Armed Forces, ordered the shootdown of the pro-coup F-16s still in the air. Anti-coup F-16 jet fighters of the 9th Air Wing from the Bandırma Air Base chased the pro-coup F-16s in the air, and the F-4E/2020 Terminator jet bombers of the 1st Air Wing's 111th squadron from the Eskişehir Air Base bombed the runway thresholds of the air base to prevent the aircraft operating from Akıncı AFB from landing or taking off. The pro-coup aircraft were thus forced to land at other air bases.

President Erdoğan credited the media and the people of Turkey in standing up against the coup plotters and said that the final straw that broke the back of the attempted coup was when the Turkish government dropped 12 bombs on the Akıncı Air Base.

== Relocation and redevelopment ==
Prime Minister Binali Yıldırım said while addressing a crowd in the Kazan district of Ankara, which houses the base: "That Akıncı Air Base which nested traitors will be closed and it will be turned into a place where the memories of our martyrs will be kept alive". On August 12, 2016, Minister of National Defense Fikri Işık stated that there was popular support for relocating the air base and redeveloping the area into a "democracy park".

On September 6, 2016, the Turkish Air Force renamed the air base "Mürted", which was the name it went by until 1995. "Mürted" means "apostate", and it was given to the site in reference to the desertion of some troops of Ottoman Sultan Bayezid I (reigned 1389‒1403) in the Battle of Ankara (1402) against the Timurid Empire. The base's status was downgraded so that it is commanded by a group captain instead of an air commodore before. With a governmental decree issued under the state of emergency, the three air squadrons were deactivated, and the air base jet fighters were transferred to be embedded at the 5th Air Wing Merzifon AFB, 1st Air Wing Eskişehir AFB and 3rd Training Wing Konya AFB. The final destination of the TAI facilities hosted by the air base remains unclear.

== Name and status change ==
The facility was initially named "Mürted" after the location in Ankara at its establishment as an airbase. In 1993, the air base was renamed "Akıncı" in honor of Staff Group captain Erol Akıncı, who died during a flight mission in 1968. The facility's status as an airbase was downgraded in September 2016 to an airfield following the 15 July 2016 coup d'état attempt because it played a major role as the headquarters of the plot, and subsequently relocation of the 4th Air Wing.

== Other airports in Ankara ==
- Esenboğa International Airport
- Etimesgut Air Base
- Güvercinlik Army Air Base
