= General Doyle =

General Doyle may refer to:

- Charles Hastings Doyle (1803–1883), British Army major general
- Charles William Doyle (1770–1842) was a British Army lieutenant general
- David K. Doyle (1931–2021), U.S. Army lieutenant general
- John Milley Doyle (1781–1856), Irish-born Portuguese Army major general
- Sir John Doyle, 1st Baronet (1756–1834), British Army general
- Welbore Ellis Doyle (1758–1797), British Army major general
- General Doyle (1803 ship) – a privateer, packet ship, and merchant ship

== See also ==
- Attorney General Doyle (disambiguation)
