= Army Chief Information Officer/G-6 =

In September 2020, the Army realigned the previously consolidated CIO/G-6 function into two separate roles, Office of the Chief Information Officer and Deputy Chief of Staff, G-6, that report to the secretary of the Army and chief of staff of the Army, respectively. The realignment came after several months of planning and coordination. Lt. Gen. John Morrison was nominated to the Senate for promotion and assignment as the G-6 and confirmed, assuming that position in August 2020. Subsequently, the Secretary of the Army, Ryan McCarthy appointed Dr. Raj G. Iyer as the first civilian Chief Information Officer, a career Senior Executive Service position in November 2020.

== G-6 ==
1. Advise chief of staff of the Army and the Chief Information Officer on planning, fielding, and execution of C4IT worldwide Army operations
2. Develop and execute the plan for the Unified Network
3. Implement Army information assurance
4. Supervise C4IT, Signal support, Information security, Force structure and equipping activities in support of warfighting operations
5. Oversee management of the Signal forces

== Planned realignment ==
On June 11, 2020, the Army announced that the two roles of CIO and Deputy Chief of Staff, G-6 (DCS, G-6) would be realigned no later than August 31, 2020, with separate individuals responsible for each position. With the realignment:

- CIO core functions will be policy, governance, and oversight. Focus areas include: Information Environment, Cybersecurity, Enterprise Architecture, and Data Policy/Oversight/Governance, Enterprise Architecture, Enterprise Cloud Management and IT Spend/Category Management.
- DCS, G-6 core functions will be planning, strategy, and implementation. Focus areas include: Information Environment/Network, Planning and Integration, Theater Synchronization, Architecture Integration, Enterprise Information Environment (EIE) Mission Area Portfolio Management and Mission Decision Packet Management.
  - In order to support multi-domain operations, the Army will have to connect Enterprise networks and tactical networks. —LTG Morrison, DCS, G-6
  - DCS G-6 released the Army Unified Network Plan under the Army Digital Transformation Strategy, to help the Army to establish a Multi-Domain Operations capable force by 2028. The Unified Network will enable Army formations, as part of the Joint Force, to operate in highly contested and congested operational environments with the speed and global range to achieve decision dominance and maintain overmatch. The plan shapes, synchronizes, integrates and governs Unified Network efforts and aligns the personnel, organizational structure and capabilities required to enable MDO at all echelons.

== Chief signal officers and their successors ==
Chief signal officers (1860–1964)

- Maj. Albert J. Myer 1860–1863
- Lt. Col. William J. L. Nicodemus 1863–1864
- Col. Benjamin F. Fisher 1864–1866
- Col. Albert J. Myer 1866–1880 (promoted to brigadier general 16 June 1880)
- Brig. Gen. William B. Hazen 1880–1887
- Brig. Gen. Adolphus W. Greely 1887–1906
- Brig. Gen. James Allen 1906–1913
- Brig. Gen. George P. Scriven 1913–1917
- Brig. Gen. George O. Squier 1917–1923 (promoted to major general 6 October 1917)
- Maj. Gen. Charles McK. Saltzman 1924–1928
- Maj. Gen. George Sabin Gibbs 1928–1931
- Maj. Gen. Irving J. Carr 1931–1934
- Maj. Gen. James B. Allison 1935–1937
- Maj. Gen. Joseph O. Mauborgne 1937–1941
- Maj. Gen. Dawson Olmstead 1941–1943
- Maj. Gen. Harry C. Ingles 1943–1947
- Maj. Gen. Spencer B. Akin 1947–1951
- Maj. Gen. George I. Back 1951–1955
- Lt. Gen. James D. O’Connell 1955–1959
- Maj. Gen. Ralph T. Nelson 1959–1962
- Maj. Gen. Earle F. Cook 1962–1963
- Maj. Gen. David Parker Gibbs 1963–1964

Chiefs of communications-electronics (1964–1967)

- Maj. Gen. David Parker Gibbs 1964–1966
- Maj. Gen. Walter E. Lotz, Jr. 1966–1967

Assistant chiefs of staff for communications-electronics (1967–1974)

- Maj. Gen. Walter E. Lotz, Jr. 1967–1968
- Maj. Gen. George E. Pickett 1968–1972
- Lt. Gen. Thomas Rienzi 1972–1974

Directors of telecommunications and command and control (1974–1978) (a directorate of ODCSOPS)

- Lt. Gen. Thomas Rienzi 1974–1977
- Lt. Gen. Charles R. Myer 1977–1978

Assistant chiefs of staff for automation and communications (1978–1981)

- Lt. Gen. Charles R. Myer 1978–1979
- Maj. Gen. Clay T. Buckingham 1979–1981

Assistant deputy chiefs of staff for operations and plans (command, control, communications, and computers) (1981–1984)

- Maj. Gen. Clay T. Buckingham 1981–1982
- Maj. Gen. James M. Rockwell 1982–1984

Assistant chiefs of staff for information management (1984–1987)

- Lt. Gen. David K. Doyle 1984–1986
- Lt. Gen. Thurman D. Rodgers 1986–1987

Directors of information systems for command, control, communications, and computers

- Lt. Gen. Thurman D. Rodgers 1987–1988
- Lt. Gen. Bruce R. Harris 1988–1990
- Lt. Gen. Jerome B. Hilmes 1990–1992
- Lt. Gen. Peter A. Kind 1992–1994
- Lt. Gen. Otto J. Guenther 1995–1997
- Lt. Gen. William H. Campbell

Chief Information Officer, Military Deputy to the Army Acquisition Executive, and Director of Information Systems for Command, Control, Communications and Computers

- Lt. Gen. William H. Campbell 1997–2000

No.	Deputy Chief of Staff		Term		
No.	Portrait	Name	Took office	Left office	Term length
Deputy Chief of Staff C4 Operations and Networks and Chief Information Officer
43	Peter Cuviello	Lieutenant General; Peter Cuviello	2000	2003	~3 years
44	Steven Boutelle	Lieutenant General; Steven Boutelle	2003	2007	~4 years
45	Jeffrey Sorenson	Lieutenant General; Jeffrey Sorenson	2007	2010	~3 years
46	Susan S. Lawrence	Lieutenant General; Susan S. Lawrence	2011	2013	~2 years
47	Robert S. Ferrell	Lieutenant General; Robert S. Ferrell	2013	2017	~4 years
48	Bruce T. Crawford	Lieutenant General; Bruce T. Crawford	2017	2020	~3 years
Deputy Chief of Staff C4 Operations and Networks
49	John B. Morrison	Lieutenant General; John B. Morrison	August 4, 2020	December 19, 2024	4 years, 137 days
50	Jeth Rey	Lieutenant General; Jeth Rey	January 1, 2025	Incumbent	103 days

== See also ==
- United States Army Chief Information Officer
