= David Isaacson =

U.S. Army general

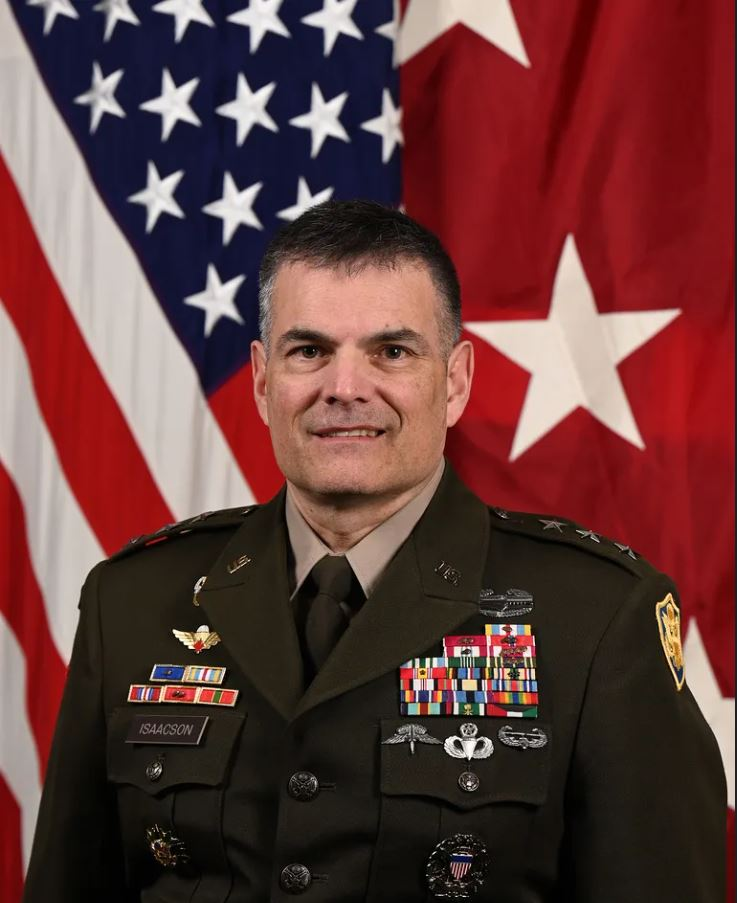
- Official portrait, 2024
- Born: Fort Monroe, Virginia, U.S.
- Military career
- Allegiance: United States
- Branch: United States Army
- Rank: Lieutenant General
- Service number: 1988–present
- Commands: 93rd Signal Brigade
- Conflicts: Gulf War; War in Afghanistan; Iraq War
- Awards: Defense Superior Service Medal; Legion of Merit (3); Bronze Star Medal (3)

David T. Isaacson is a United States Army lieutenant general who has served as the director of command, control, communications, and computer and chief information officer of the Joint Staff since December 2023. He most recently served as the director of manpower and personnel of the Joint Staff since June 2022 to December 2023. He previously served as the Chief of Staff of the United States Cyber Command. Previously, he served as the Director of Architecture, Operations, Networks, and Space of the United States Army.

Military offices
Preceded by Peter A. Gallagher	Deputy Commanding General of the Army Network Enterprise Technology Command; 2015–2016	Succeeded by ???
Preceded by Mitchell L. Kilgo	Deputy Chief of Staff for Cyber of the United States Army Forces Command; 2016–2018	Succeeded by Robert L. Edmonson II
Preceded by Randy S. Taylor	Director of Architecture, Operations, Networks, and Space of the United States Army; 2018–2020	Succeeded by Thomas A. Pugh
Preceded by John B. Morrison	Chief of Staff of the United States Cyber Command; 2020–2022	Succeeded by Bradley L. Pyburn
Preceded by Lenny J. Richoux	Director of Manpower and Personnel of the Joint Staff; 2022–2023	Succeeded by Paige M. Jennings
Preceded by Charleen Laughlin; Acting	Director for Command, Control, Communications, and Computers/Cyber and Chief Information Officer of the Joint Staff; 2023–present	Incumbent
