= Thurman Rodgers =

Thurman Rodgers may refer to:

- Thurman D. Rodgers, United States Army general
- T. J. Rodgers (Thurman John Rodgers), American billionaire scientist and entrepreneur
