= ISSSC =

ISSSC may refer to:

- Institute for the Study of Secularism in Society and Culture, at Trinity College in Hartford, Connecticut
- International Society for the Suppression of Savage Customs, a fictional society in the 1899 novel Heart of Darkness by Joseph Conrad
- United States Army Information Systems Software Support Command, a predecessor to the United States Army Information Systems Engineering Command
