= Stephen Fogarty =

U.S. Army general

Stephen G. Fogarty
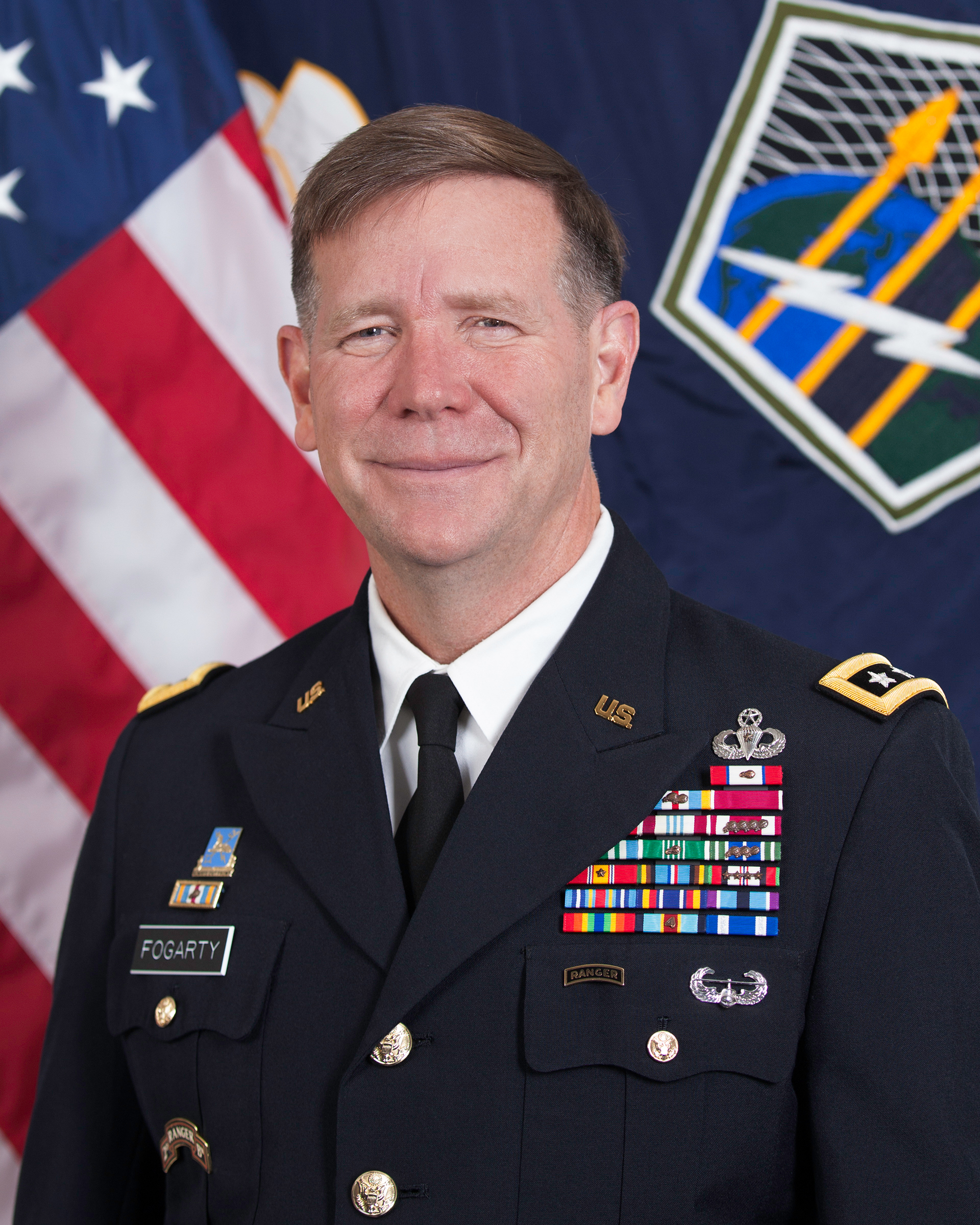
- Military career
- Allegiance: United States
- Branch: United States Army
- Service years: 1983-2022
- Rank: Lieutenant General
- Commands: United States Army Cyber Command; United States Army Cyber Center of Excellence; United States Army Intelligence and Security Command; 116th Military Intelligence Brigade; 732nd Military Intelligence Battalion
- Conflicts: War in Afghanistan
- Awards: Army Distinguished Service Medal (2); Defense Superior Service Medal (3); Legion of Merit; Bronze Star Medal (2)

Stephen G. Fogarty is a retired United States Army lieutenant general who last served as the Commanding General of the United States Army Cyber Command from 2018 to 2022. Previously, he served as the Chief of Staff of the United States Cyber Command.

Military offices
Preceded by Michael T. Flynn	Director of Intelligence of the United States Central Command; 2008–2010	Succeeded by Robert P. Ashley Jr.
Preceded by Robert A. Carr	Deputy Chief of Staff for Intelligence of the International Security Assistance Force; 2010–2012	Succeeded by Robert P. Ashley Jr.
Preceded by Mary A. Legere	Commanding General of the United States Army Intelligence and Security Command; 2012–2014	Succeeded by George J. Franz III
Preceded by Lawarren V. Patterson	Commanding General of the United States Army Cyber Center of Excellence; 2014–2016	Succeeded by John B. Morrison
Preceded by Joseph A. Brendler	Chief of Staff of the United States Cyber Command; 2016–2018	Succeeded by Ross A. Myers
Preceded by Paul M. Nakasone	Commanding General of the United States Army Cyber Command; 2018–2022	Succeeded by Maria B. Barrett
