= United States Army Communications-Electronics Command =

U.S. Army's provider and maintainer of C5ISR capabilities

Communications-Electronics Command
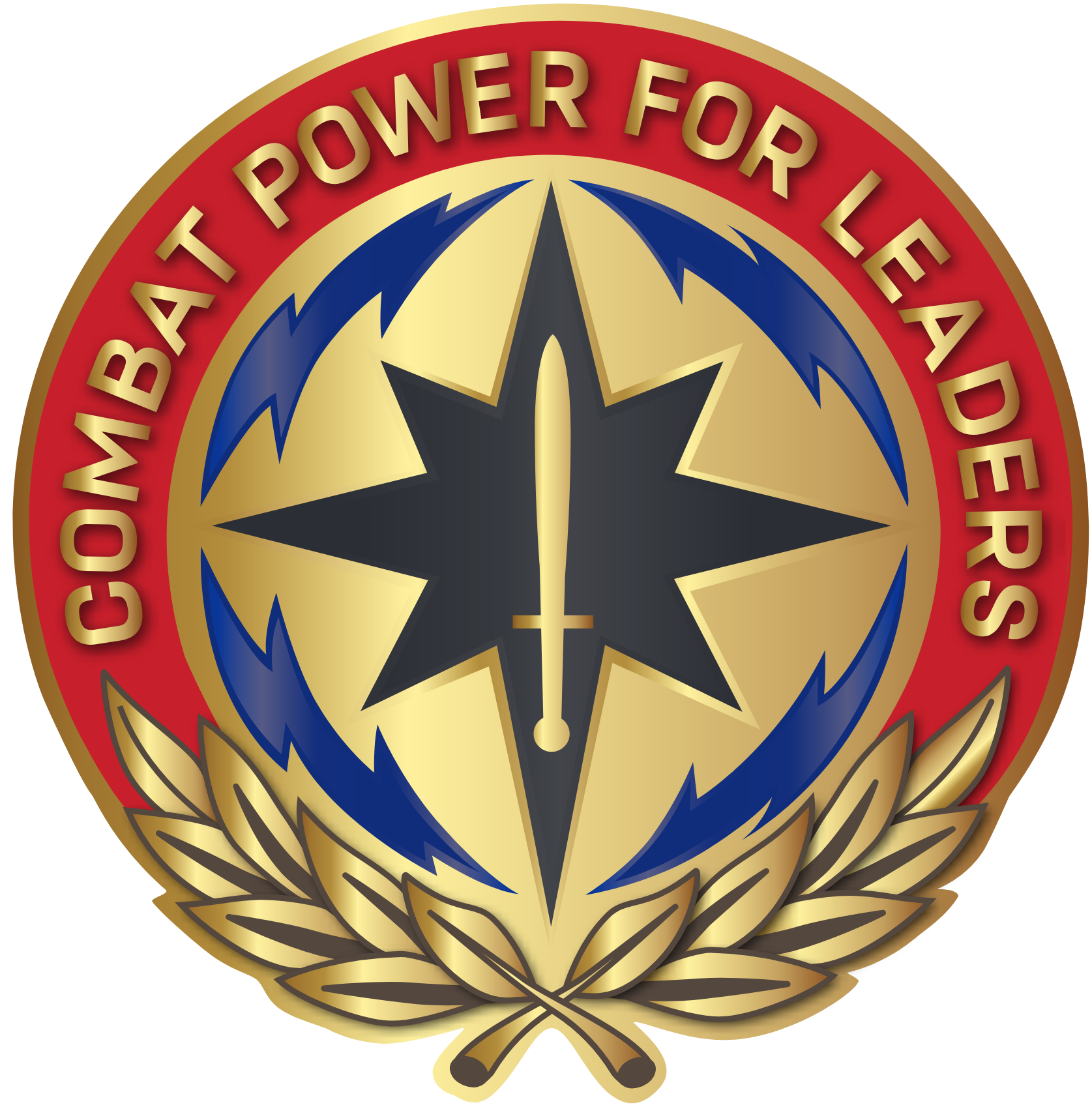
- CECOM distinctive unit insignia
- Active: 1981–present
- Country: United States
- Branch: United States Army
- Type: Life Cycle Management Command
- Size: 13,000 employees
- Part of: U.S. Army Materiel Command
- Garrison/HQ: Aberdeen Proving Ground, Maryland
- Website: www.cecom.army.mil Official website

Commanders
- Current commander: MG James D. Turinetti IV
- Notable commanders: MG Robert L. Nabors (Sept 1998 – July 2001)

Insignia
- Shoulder sleeve insignia of the U.S. Army Materiel Command, worn by CECOM service members

The U.S. Army Communications-Electronics Command (CECOM) is a Life Cycle Management Command (LCMC) of the United States Army headquartered at Aberdeen Proving Ground, Maryland. It is one of four such commands under the Army Materiel Command (AMC). CECOM is the Army's provider and maintainer of command, control, communications, computers, cyber, intelligence, surveillance, and reconnaissance (C5ISR) equipment.

CECOM has approximately 13,000 military, civilian and contract personnel across five reporting organizations:

1. Army Medical Logistics Command, Fort Detrick, Maryland;
2. Information Systems Engineering Command, Fort Huachuca, Arizona;
3. CECOM Army Software and Innovation Center, Aberdeen Proving Ground, Maryland;
4. CECOM Integrated Logistics Support Center, Aberdeen Proving Ground, Maryland;
5. Tobyhanna Army Depot, Pennsylvania.

== Mission ==
CECOM specializes in communications-electronics systems and equipment, to include setting up headquarters and command and tactical operations centers in remote areas to installing and maintaining communications systems in vehicles and aircraft. CECOM also provides training activities, field support for modifications and upgrades, and logistical expertise. The C5ISR Materiel Enterprise is a subset of the Army's Materiel Enterprise; the latter is one of four Army enterprises, which include: Human Capital, Readiness, and Services and Infrastructure.

== History ==
The history of the Communications-Electronics Command began in 1917, with the establishment of a Signal Corps training facility and radio research and development laboratory at Fort Monmouth, New Jersey. In 1929, the Signal Corps' Electrical Laboratory of Washington and the Signal Corps Research Laboratory of New York merged with the Radio Laboratories at Fort Monmouth to form the Signal Corps Laboratories (SCL).

The forerunner of the Army Air Corps and the U.S. Air Force had its roots at Fort Monmouth. In 1928, the first radio-equipped meteorological balloon traveled into the upper reaches of the atmosphere, a forerunner of a weather sounding technique universally used today. The first U.S. aircraft detection radar was developed at the Signal Corps Center in 1938. In 1946, space communications were proven feasible when the Diana Radar bounced electronic signals off the Moon.

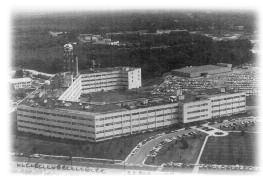
The Signal Corps Center at Fort Monmouth, New Jersey, 1949

In 1949, the Signal Corps Center was established, consolidating many existing signal-related functions, including: the Signal Corps Engineering Laboratories (SCEL), the Signal Corps Board, Signal School, Signal Corps Publications Agency, Signal Corps Intelligence Unit, Pigeon Breeding and Training Center, the Army portion of the Electro Standards Agency, and the Signal Corps troop units.

In 1962, the Army disbanded the technical services and established the Electronics Command (ECOM) at Fort Monmouth. This CECOM predecessor was charged with managing signal research, development, and logistics support. As an element of the newly formed U.S. Army Materiel Command (AMC), ECOM encompassed the Signal Research and Development Laboratories, the Signal Materiel Support Agency, the Signal Supply Agency (including its various procurement offices), and other Signal Corps logistics support activities.

In January 1978, ECOM was fragmented, per the recommendation of the Army Materiel Acquisition Review Committee (AMARC). Three commands and one activity were formed: the Communications and Electronics Materiel Readiness Command (CERCOM), the Communications Research and Development Command (CORADCOM), the Electronics Research and Development Command (ERADCOM), and the Avionics Research and Development Activity (AVRADA).

=== Establishment of CECOM ===
Reassessment of the organization shift at Fort Monmouth, begun in August 1980, concluded that while the emphasis on research and development had increased for the better, there was also much duplication of effort. Thus AMC combined CERCOM and CORADCOM to form the new Communications-Electronics Command (CECOM), effective 1 May 1981.

The 1993 Base Realignment and Closure Commission mandated closing the Evans Area of Vint Hill Farms Station, Virginia, consequently relocating the CERDEC (Communications-Electronics Research, Development and Engineering Center) to Fort Monmouth. Additionally, CECOM gained some missions and personnel from the Belvoir Research, Development and Engineering Center (BRDEC).

On 1 October 1996, the U.S. Army Information Systems Engineering Command (ISEC) was transferred to CECOM, resulting from a study on the Army's structure of information management units. All the information management-related acquisition, engineering, and procurement functions of the former Army Information Systems Command (ISC) were assigned to CECOM.

=== Relocation to Aberdeen Proving Ground ===
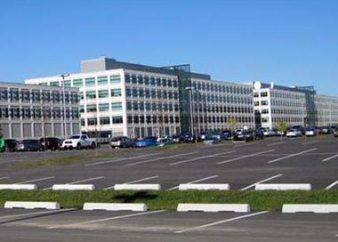
CECOM headquarters at Aberdeen Proving Ground, 2010

The 2005 Base Realignment and Closure Commission ordered the closure of Fort Monmouth, New Jersey. CECOM was to move to Aberdeen Proving Ground, Maryland. The CECOM flag was cased at Fort Monmouth on 10 September 2010, and the colors were uncased on 22 October 2010, representing CECOM’s official arrival at APG, occupying the newly completed C5ISR Center of Excellence.

Comprising six primary organizations, the "C5ISR Materiel Enterprise" has two organizations from the U.S. Army Materiel Command (AMC), one from U.S. Army Combat Capabilities Development Command (DEVCOM), and three from the Assistant Secretary of the Army for Acquisition, Logistics, and Technology, or ASA(ALT). The AMC organizations include: the U.S. Army Communications-Electronics Command (CECOM) and the Army Contracting Command-APG. The Combat Capabilities Development Command (DEVCOM) oversees the DEVCOM C5ISR Center. Lastly, the ASA(ALT) provides three program executive offices (PEOs): the PEO Command, Control, Communications, and Network (PEO C3N); the PEO Enterprise, and the PEO Intelligence, Electronic Warfare and Sensors (PEO IEW&S).

=== CERDEC transfer to Army Futures Command ===
The U.S. Army Research, Development and Engineering Command (RDECOM), including CERDEC, transferred from the Army Materiel Command to the new U.S. Army Futures Command (AFC) in 2019. Accordingly, RDECOM was renamed the Combat Capabilities Development Command (CCDC, later DEVCOM), and CERDEC was renamed the CCDC C5ISR Center (later DEVCOM C5ISR Center). The U.S. Army Communications-Electronics Command and the program executive officers (PEOs) are to coordinate with AFC and its cross-functional team (CFT)'s modernization efforts of materiel.

== Organizational structure ==
- Army Medical Logistics Command, Fort Detrick, Maryland
- Information Systems Engineering Command, Fort Huachuca, Arizona
- CECOM Army Software and Innovation Center, Aberdeen Proving Ground, Maryland
- CECOM Integrated Logistics Support Center, Aberdeen Proving Ground, Maryland
- Tobyhanna Army Depot, Pennsylvania

=== Army Medical Logistics Command ===
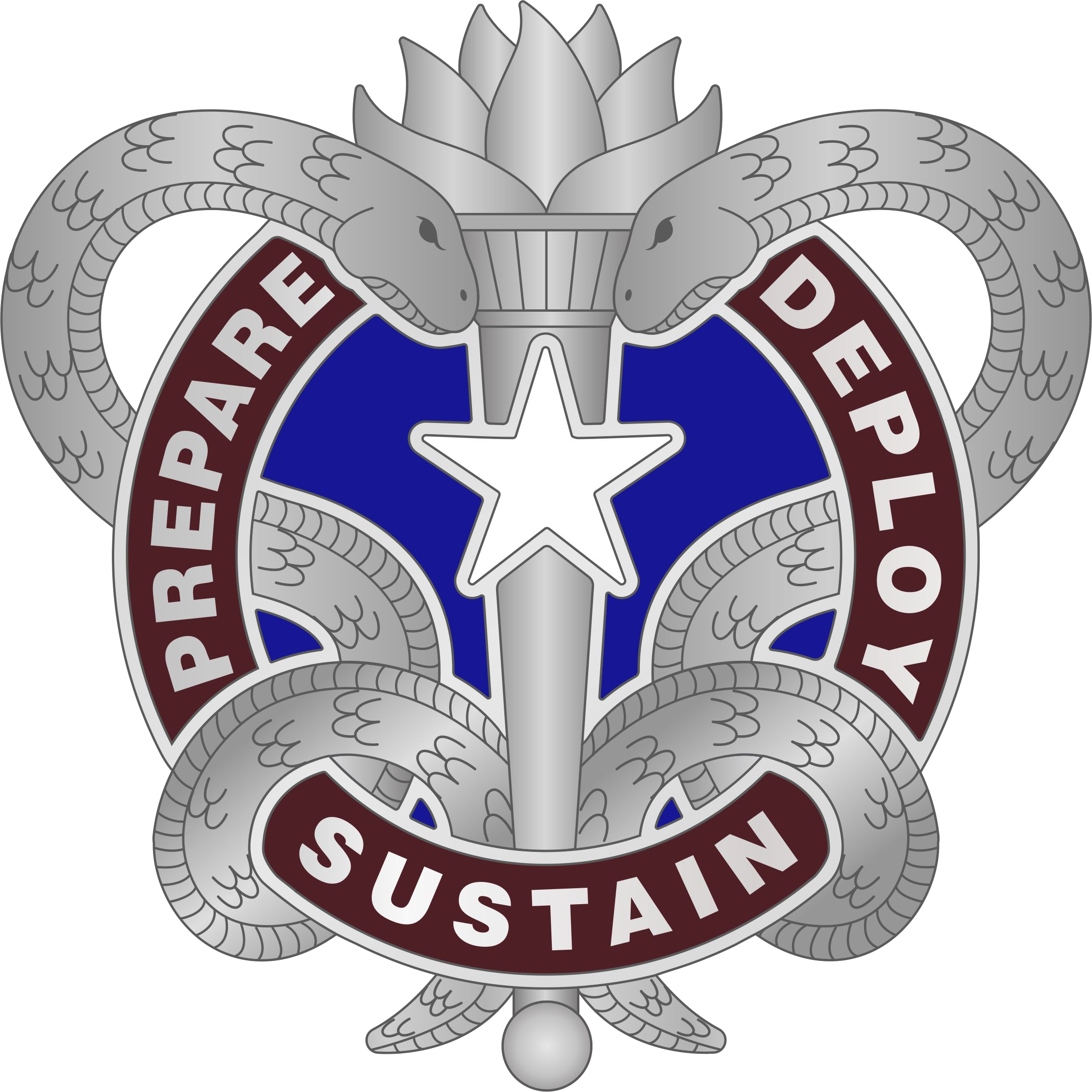
Army Medical Logistics Command distinctive unit insignia

The U.S. Army Medical Logistics Command (AMLC), a component of CECOM, manages the logistics of medical equipment and supplies used by the Army. The AMLC is headquartered at Fort Detrick, Maryland.

The Army Medical Logistics Command began operations on 1 June 2019. At some point, the AMLC was designated as a major subordinate command (MSC) of the Army Materiel Command (AMC).

In July 2021, the AMLC transitioned from its AMC MSC status to become a component of CECOM. The reason AMLC transferred under CECOM was due to similarities in managing the intricate parts in both communications-electronics and medical equipment.

The AMLC's Integrated Logistics Support Center (ILSC) was established in 2022. On 1 October 2025, the AMLC ILSC was transferred to CECOM ILSC as the Medical Logistics Directorate.

=== Information Systems Engineering Command ===
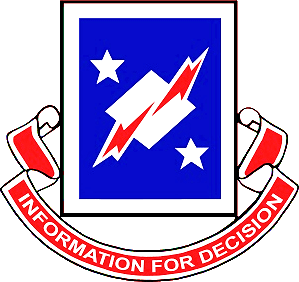
Information Systems Engineering Command distinctive unit insignia

The Information Systems Engineering Command (ISEC) is a command of CECOM responsible for engineering and operational support of communications systems.

On 1 October 1996, the Information Systems Engineering Command was transferred to CECOM, resulting from a study on the Army's structure of information management units.

=== Army Software and Innovation Center ===
The Army Software and Innovation Center (ASIC) is a component of CECOM, responsible for designing and developing military accounting and business software. ASIC was previously named the CECOM Software Engineering Center (SEC).

Between 1996 and 1997, the CECOM Software Engineering Directorate (SED) gained significant new assets and missions. The directorate was elevated to a center, and was renamed as the CECOM Software Engineering Center (SEC) on 1 October 1997. The CECOM SEC was re-designated as the CECOM Army Software and Innovation Center (ASIC), effective 20 January 2026. The renaming accompanied the Army’s broader transformation efforts.

=== CECOM Integrated Logistics Support Center ===
The CECOM Integrated Logistics Support Center (ILSC) is a component of CECOM responsible for the logistics support of communications systems.

The CECOM Logistics and Readiness Center (LRC) was provisionally established on November 10, 1987. On 1 August 2016, the CECOM commander renamed the CECOM LRC as the CECOM Integrated Logistics Support Center (ILSC).

A component of the CECOM ILSC, the former Communications Security Logistics Activity (CSLA) provided centralized logistics support for communications security (COMSEC) software and services. Between late 2025 and early 2026, CSLA was discontinued and split into two directorates, one under ISEC, and the other under the CECOM ILSC.

=== Tobyhanna Army Depot ===
Tobyhanna Army Depot (TYAD) is an electronics maintenance facility of the United States Army. Located in Pennsylvania, the depot is assigned to CECOM.

On 1 November 1997, AMC assigned CECOM the control of Tobyhanna Army Depot, located in Pennsylvania.

== Former elements ==
=== Central Technical Support Facility ===
The Central Technical Support Facility (CTSF) was a component of CECOM. The CTSF was located at Fort Hood, Texas.

CECOM assumed control of the Central Technical Support Facility (CTSF) at Fort Hood, Texas, on 9 July 2007. The CTSF ensured compliance with DoD net-centric concepts. The U.S. Army's Central Technical Support Facility officially cased its colors on 28 April 2025. The CTSF ensured adequate interoperability of its assigned equipment, and ensured secure data sharing for soldiers. Its closure represented a shift toward more modern, digital testing methods.

== Timeline of notable accomplishments ==
- 1918: Standardization and quality control of vacuum tubes for military radios resulted in a total standard for vacuum tube production for both military and civilian applications.
- 1928: The first radio-equipped weather balloon was launched in 1928. This was the first major development in the application of electronics to the study of weather, and of conditions in the upper atmosphere.
- 1938: Aircraft detecting radar was developed in 1938 at Fort Monmouth, the Evans Signal Laboratories, and at Fort Hancock at Sandy Hook. This provided the U.S. with the capability of aircraft detection and early warning. Radar sets, such as the SCR-270, were used in World War II and also later in the civilian aviation industry.
- 1940: Development of the SCR-300 first portable, hand-held, FM "walkie-talkie" for use in the front lines occurred. This was the first major development in the miniaturization of radio equipment.
- 1946: On 10 January, Fort Monmouth took the first electronic step into space when the first radar signal was bounced off the Moon using a modified SCR-271. It took the Diana radar 2^{1}/_{2} seconds to reach the Moon and return. This proved the feasibility of extraterrestrial radio communications.
- 1948: The first synthetically produced, large quartz crystals were grown by researchers at Fort Monmouth. These crystals were able to be used in the manufacture of electronic components, and made the U.S. largely independent of foreign imports for this critical mineral.
- 1949: On 28 September, a record height of 140,000 feet (43,000 meters) was set by a high-altitude balloon of the Signal Corps Engineering Laboratories at Fort Monmouth.
- 1957: Colonel William Blair finally received his radar patent, U.S. Patent Number 2,803,819. He is remembered as the "father of American radar."
- 1958: Development of solar cells for satellite power in space. The solar cells developed by Fort Monmouth scientists powered the Vanguard I satellite in space for more than five years.
- 1958: The first communication satellite was developed under Project SCORE (Signal Communications via Orbiting Relay Experiment) in 1958. Launched on 18 December that year, Project SCORE broadcast President Eisenhower's Christmas greeting, proving that voice and code signals could be relayed over vast distances using satellite communication technology developed at Fort Monmouth.
- 1959: The first weather satellite, the Vanguard 2, was launched on 19 February 1959, equipped to map the earth's cloud patterns utilizing a varying infrared scanning device. The electronics for the satellite were developed at Fort Monmouth.
- 1960: The first televised weather satellite, TIROS-1, was developed under the technical supervision of the Fort Monmouth laboratories. TIROS-1 sent the first televised weather photographs of Earth's cloud cover and weather patterns to the giant 60-foot (18-meter) "Space Sentry" antenna at Fort Monmouth.
- 1960: The first large-scale mobile computer, the Mobile Digital Computer (MOBIDIC), was developed at Fort Monmouth. It was the first computer developed for use at the field army and theater levels. This van-mounted computer was the first experiment in automating combat support functions of artillery, surveillance, logistics and battlefield administration.
- 1971: For the first time, a system test bed demonstrated the ability to intercept signals on an airborne platform. The RC-12 Guardrail evolved through multiple product improvements to become the "most prolific intelligence system in the field." Its many "firsts" included the following properties: being the first tactical, airborne, and remote-controlled communications intelligence (COMINT) system; being the first multiple platform signals intelligence (SIGINT) system; and, being the first COMINT system that could be controlled through a satellite relay.
- 1975: The solid-state AN/TTC-38 gave the user a touch-dialing pathway to anywhere in the worldwide military telephone system.

== List of commanding generals ==
No.	Commanding General		Term		
No.	Portrait	Name	Took office	Left office	Duration
1	Donald M. Babers	Major General; Donald M. Babers	1 May 1981	October 1982	1 year, 153 days
2	Lawrence F. Skibbie	Major General; Lawrence F. Skibbie	October 1982	June 1984	1 year, 244 days
3	Robert D. Morgan	Major General; Robert D. Morgan	June 1984	15 May 1987	4 years, 226 days
4	Billy M. Thomas	Major General; Billy M. Thomas	15 May 1987	10 July 1990	3 years, 56 days
5	Alfred J. Mallette	Major General; Alfred J. Mallette	10 July 1990	22 July 1992	2 years, 12 days
6	Otto J. Guenther	Major General; Otto J. Guenther	22 July 1992	10 January 1995	2 years, 163 days
7	Gerard P. Brohm	Major General; Gerard P. Brohm	10 January 1995	1 September 1998	3 years, 243 days
8	Robert L. Nabors	Major General; Robert L. Nabors	1 September 1998	20 July 2001	2 years, 322 days
9	William H. Russ	Major General; William H. Russ	20 July 2001	June 2004	2 years, 317 days
10	Michael R. Mazzucchi	Major General; Michael R. Mazzucchi	June 2004	July 2007	3 years, 30 days
11	Dennis L. Via	Major General; Dennis L. Via	July 2007	23 June 2009	1 year, 357 days
12	Randolph P. Strong	Major General; Randolph P. Strong	23 June 2009	9 February 2012	2 years, 231 days
13	Robert S. Ferrell	Major General; Robert S. Ferrell	9 February 2012	23 December 2013	1 year, 317 days
-	Gary P. Martin	Gary P. Martin; Acting	23 December 2013	20 May 2014	148 days
14	Bruce T. Crawford	Major General; Bruce T. Crawford	20 May 2014	13 April 2017	2 years, 328 days
15	Randy S. Taylor	Major General; Randy S. Taylor	13 April 2017	20 June 2019	2 years, 68 days
16	Mitchell L. Kilgo	Major General; Mitchell L. Kilgo	20 June 2019	6 August 2021	2 years, 47 days
17	Robert L. Edmonson II	Major General; Robert L. Edmonson II	6 August 2021	7 June 2024	2 years, 306 days
-	Liz S. Miranda	Liz S. Miranda; Acting	7 June 2024	28 June 2024	21 days
18	James D. Turinetti IV	Major General; James D. Turinetti IV	28 June 2024	Incumbent	2 years, 65 days
