= United States Army Information Systems Engineering Command =

Command of the Communications-Electronics Command

Information Systems Engineering Command
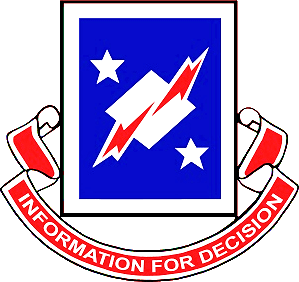
- ISEC emblem
- Active: 1943-present
- Country: United States
- Branch: United States Army
- Type: Command (brigade-size)
- Role: Information systems
- Part of: U.S. Army Communications-Electronics Command
- Garrison/HQ: Fort Huachuca, Arizona
- Motto: Information For Decision
- Website: Official website army.mil Profile

Commanders
- Current commander: COL Matthew G. Miller
- Command Sergeant Major: CSM Endesha A. Johnson

Insignia
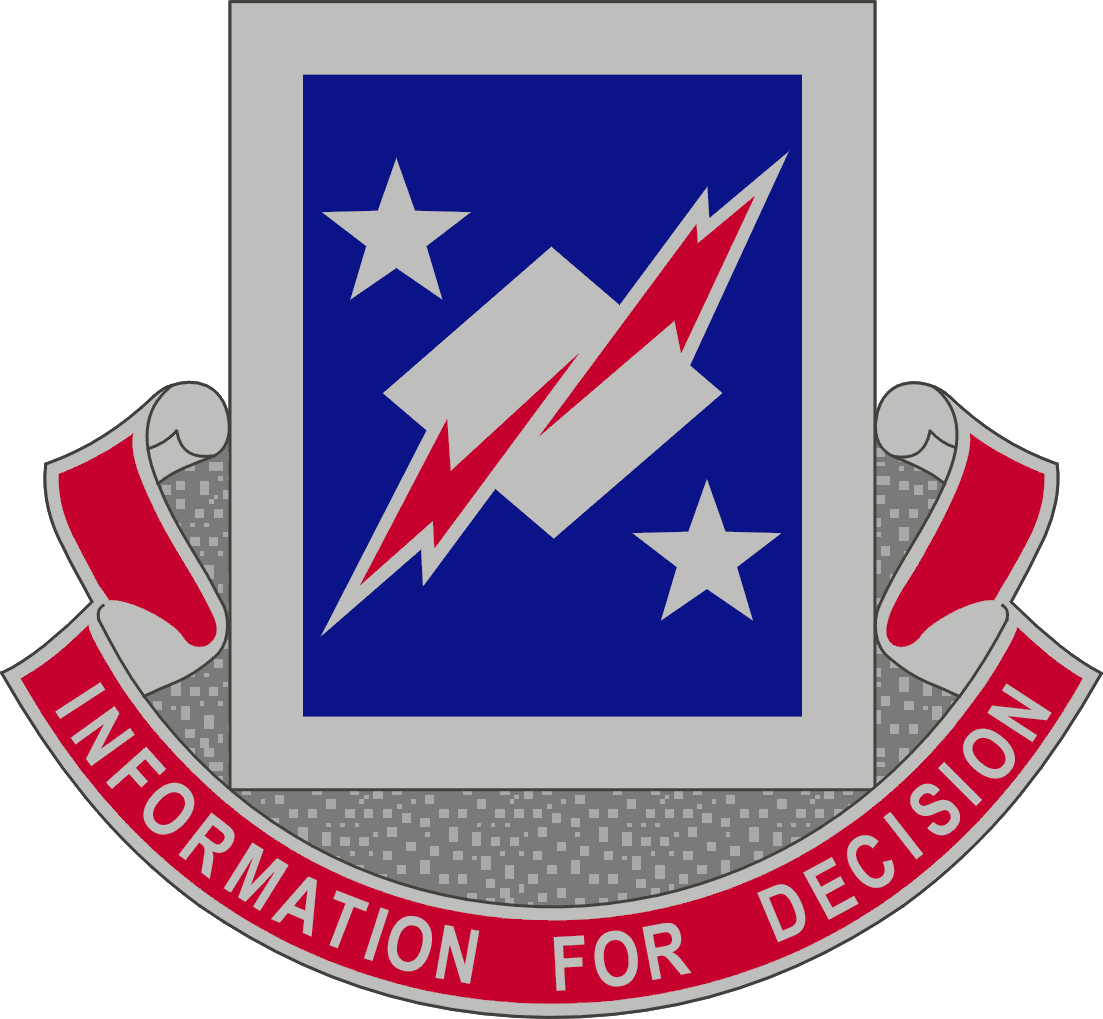
- Distinctive unit insignia

- Former shoulder sleeve insignia (1989–2010)

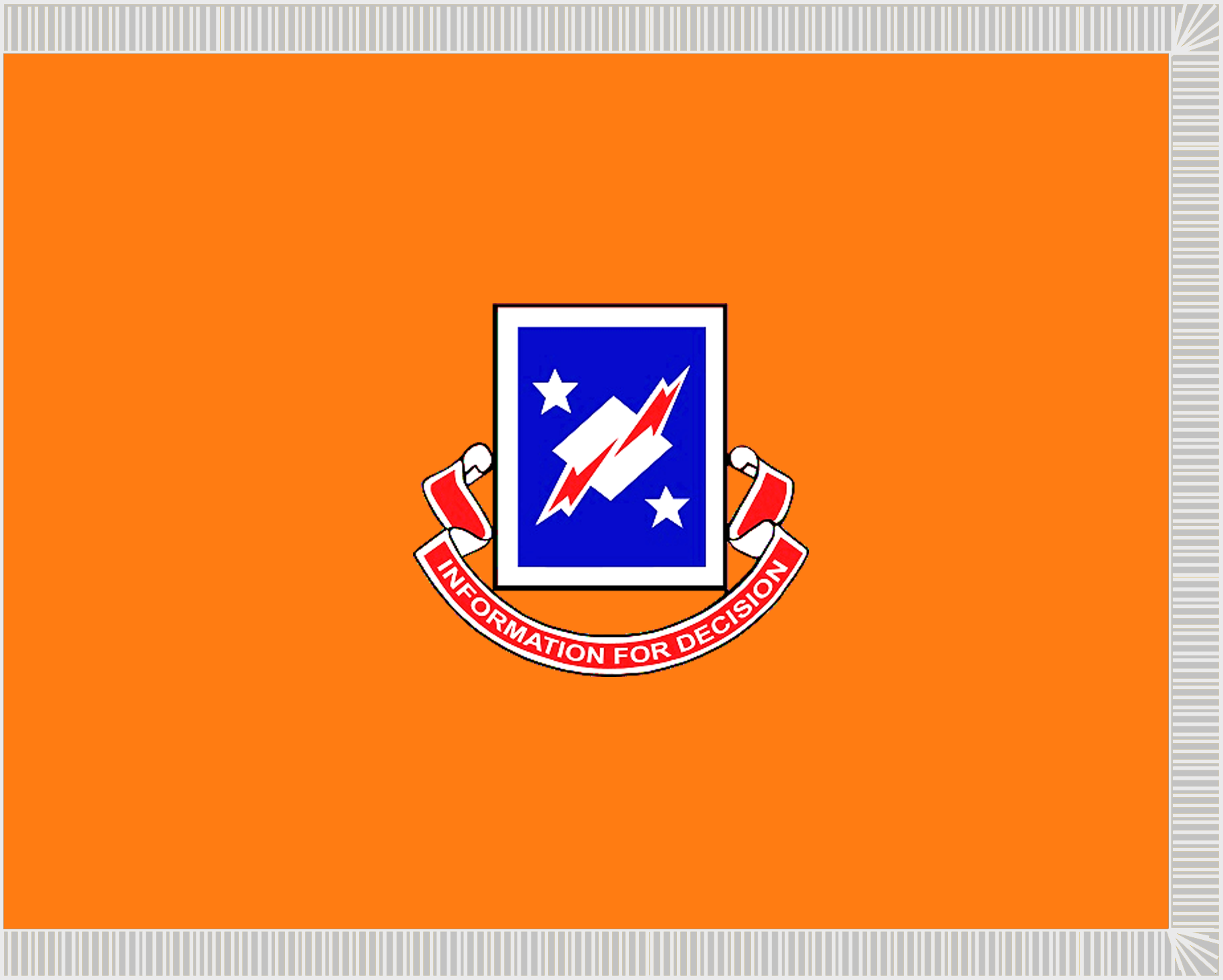
- US Army Information Systems Engineering Command Flag

The U.S. Army Information Systems Engineering Command (USAISEC or ISEC) is a command of the United States Army under the Army Communications-Electronics Command (CECOM). ISEC is headquartered on Fort Huachuca, Arizona.

== History ==
USAISEC was formed in 1943 as the Plant and Engineering Agency, and as part of the U.S. Army Signal Corps. The agency’s mission was engineering and installing airport communications for the air navigation and meteorological facilities under the Army Airways Communications System.

In 1955 the Plant and Engineering Agency was re-designated as the Army Signal Engineering Agency.

The Army Signal Engineering Agency and the Army Communications Agency were joined under the newly established Army Strategic Communications Command (STRATCOM) in 1962. The Strategic Communications Command relocated from Washington, D.C. to Fort Huachuca, Arizona, in 1967.

Shortly after relocating, the Army Signal Engineering Agency was re-designated as the U.S. Army Communications Engineering and Installation Agency (USACEIA). (Later, the USACEIA was re-designated as the U.S. Army Communications-Electronics Engineering Installation Agency, known as USACEEIA)).

U.S. Army Computer Systems Command shoulder sleeve insignia

On 1 October 1984, the Army established the U.S. Army Information Systems Command (ISC) to consolidate all information management-related responsibilities under a single command.

Also on that date, the U.S. Army Computer Systems Command (USACSC), a then-field operating activity of the assistant deputy chief of staff for operations-C4 (command, control, communications and computers), was transferred to the ISC as a major subordinate command, and briefly designated as the U.S. Army Information Systems Software Support Command (ISSSC).

Nine months later, the ISSSC was re-designated as the U.S. Army Information Systems Engineering Command (ISEC).

ISEC's headquarters were relocated from Fort Belvoir, Virginia, to Fort Huachuca, Arizona, on 1 October 1987.

=== Transfer to Communications-Electronics Command ===
On 1 October 1996, the ISEC was transferred to the U.S. Army Communications-Electronics Command (CECOM), resulting from a study on the Army's structure of information management units. All of the information management-related acquisition, engineering, and procurement functions of the former Army Information Systems Command (ISC) were assigned to CECOM.

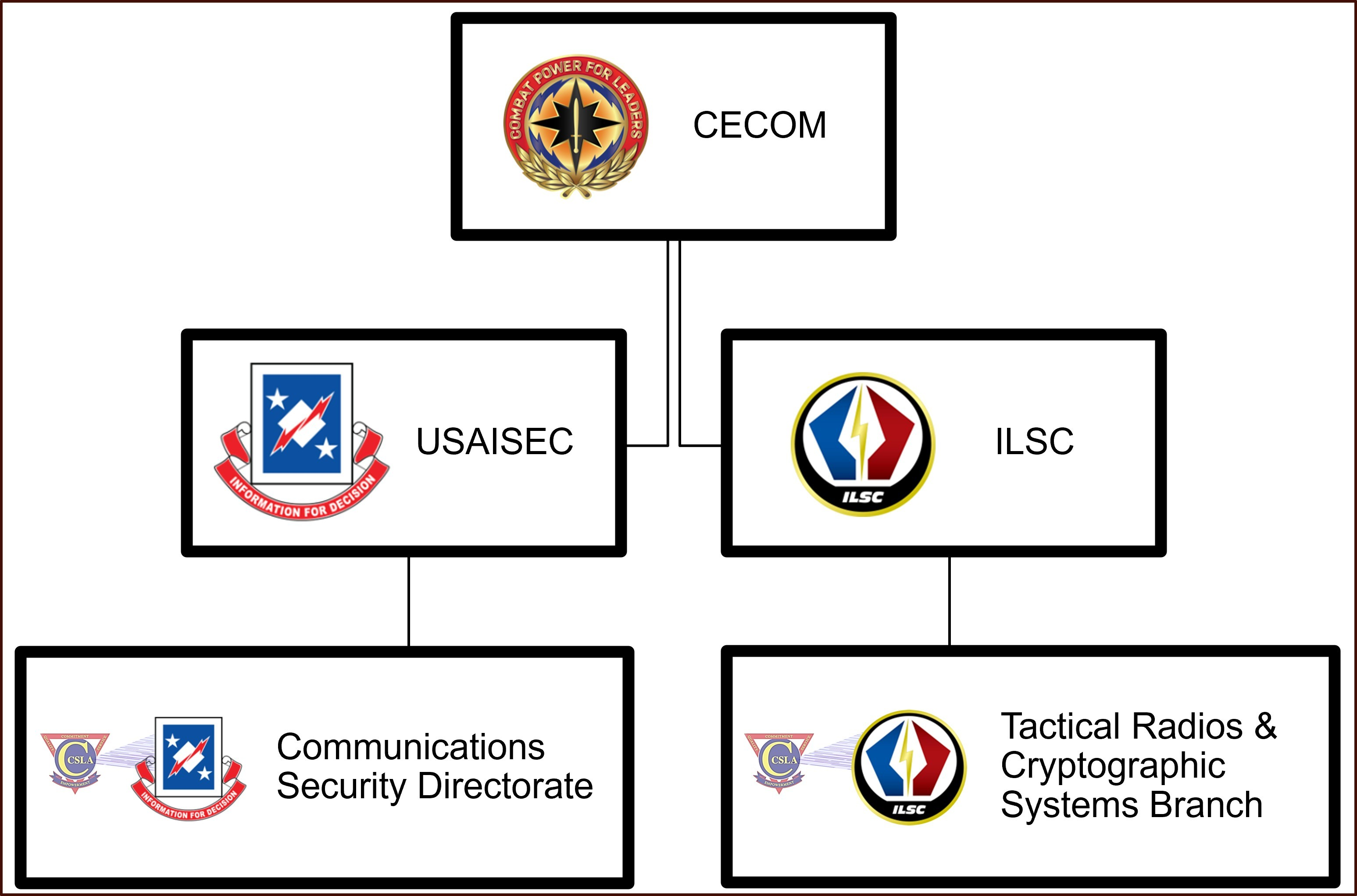
CECOM, ISEC, ILSC organizational chart - November 2025

In 2025, USAISEC functioned in the Army's modernization program for communications security (COMSEC), to update and make information systems at Army installations more resilient and less complex.
