= United States Army Chief Information Officer =

Authority in the US Army

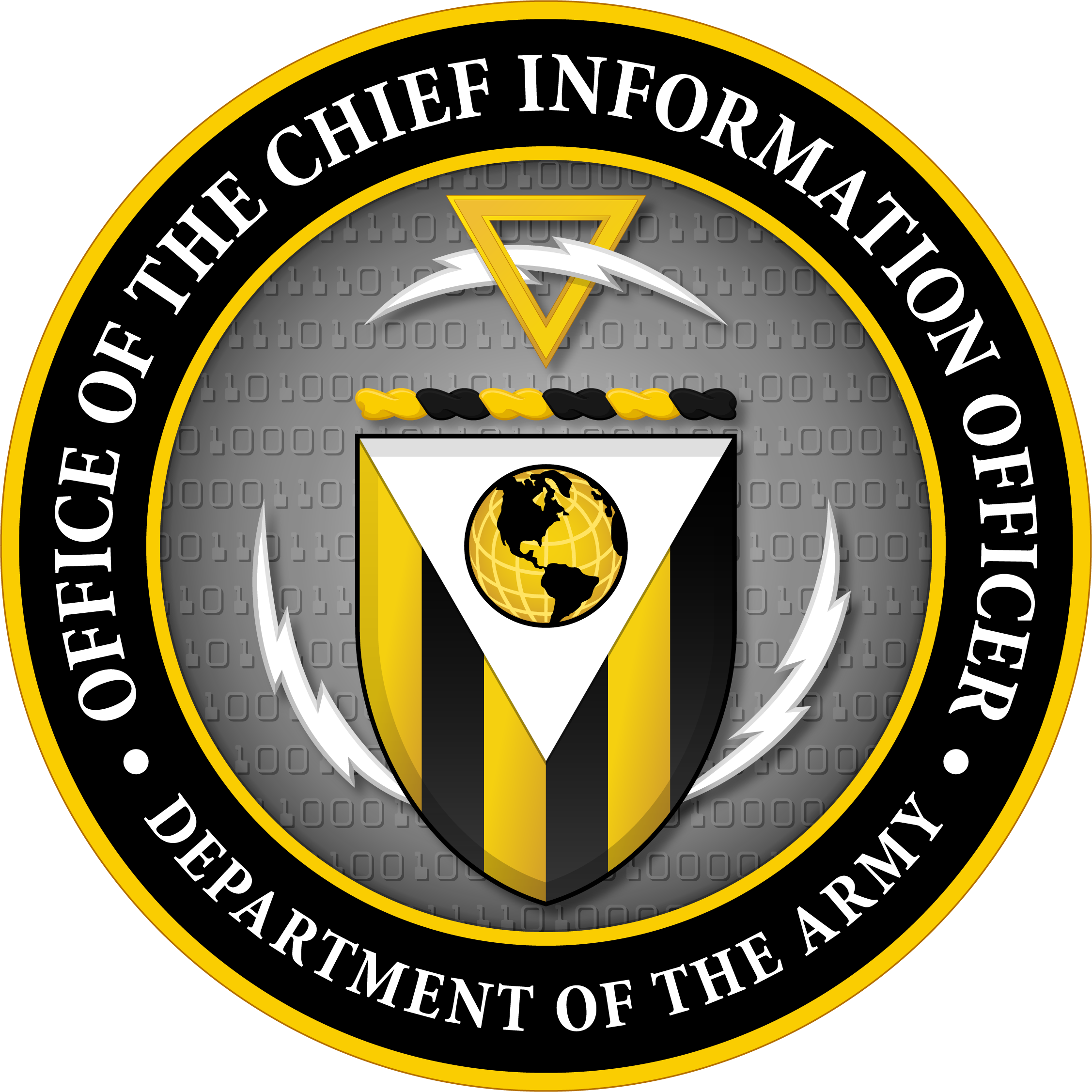
- Seal of the U.S. Army Chief Information Officer
- Incumbent; Gabriele Chiulli; Acting since May 2026
- United States Department of the Army
- Reports to: United States Secretary of the Army
- Term length: No fixed term
- Deputy: David Markowitz
- Website: www.army.mil/cio

The Chief Information Officer (CIO) is the principal adviser to the United States secretary of the Army on information resource management. The new Office of the Chief Information Officer was created from the Army Chief Information Officer/G-6, an office which previously reported to the chief of staff of the United States Army. The roles were realigned in 2020, and split into two separate positions: CIO and G6. Raj Iyer was appointed by Army secretary Ryan McCarthy as the first civilian CIO of the United States Army in November 2020. Leonel Garciga served as the chief information officer from June 2023 until May 2026. Gabriele Chiulli has served as acting chief information officer since May 2026.

== Priorities of the Chief Information Officer ==
Spearheaded by the OCIO, The Army Digital Transformation Strategy (ADTS) is the overarching framework that will set the vision, establish lines of effort (LOE), and implement strategic digital transformation initiatives prioritized and resourced to provide the capability to innovate and accelerate critical decision-making across all operational domains. The ADTS was established by Raj Iyer under the direction of Army Secretary Christine Wormuth and adopted by the Army in October 2021 to define the priorities for a data centric Army. Each LOE and initiative must be outcome-driven to ensure that it is operationally effective in a resource constrained future. The Army must and will make bold investments in transformative digital technologies, build the workforce into one with the training and experience to execute the full range of Army missions in increasingly complex technological environments, and put the right data in decision makers’ hands quicker than ever before. The Office of the CIO will lead these efforts for the Army in partnership with Headquarters, Department of Army (HQDA), Army Commands, Army Service Component Commands (ASCCs), Direct Report Units (DRUs), the Department of Defense CIO, Joint Staff, and Allied nations and partners as required.

The Army CIO serves on the Federal Chief Information Officer Council, and chairs several Army-level governance bodies including the Army Digital Oversight Council (ADOC), the Army Business Council (with the Undersecretary of the Army as co-chair), the CIO Executive Board, and the Army Cyber Risk Council.

== Office of the Chief Information Officer ==
The Office of the Chief Information Officer is composed of three directorates and three field operating agencies. The Deputy Chief Information Officer is also designated as the Army Chief Data Officer.

Enterprise System Management, Data, and Governance Directorate (EDG): The Enterprise System Management, Data, and Governance Directorate leads enterprise-level governance, integration, and modernization across the Army Enterprise Information Environment and Business Mission areas. EDG drives innovation and modernization across the Army by developing and maintaining an integrated enterprise architecture, propagating data and service standards, and applying comprehensive program management rigor to IT investments.

Policy, Resources, and Analysis Directorate (PRA): The Policy, Resources, and Analysis Directorate exercises legal, fiscal, and statutory authorities to achieve near-term and strategic CIO objectives; and delivers CIO-focused governance, policy, human capital development, financial planning, programming and execution, bulk buying strategies, and portfolio management to execute and sustain the Army Digital Transformation Strategy.

Cybersecurity Directorate (CSD): The Cybersecurity Directorate provides direction and guidance for cybersecurity policy, architecture, and resourcing to ensure the confidentiality, integrity, availability, and reputation of Army data. The Director serves as the Chief Information Security Officer (CISO) of the United States Army.

Enterprise Cloud Management Agency (ECMA): The Enterprise Cloud Management Agency is a centralized resource to establish the cloud environment to synchronize and integrate cloud efforts across the Army. ECMA was established by the first CIO, Dr. Raj G. Iyer as a new Field Operating Agency under the Office of the Chief Information Officer and codified through an amendment to the Army General Order 1. Dr. Raj Iyer established the Army Cloud Plan to move the Army closer to its objectives of digital modernization and the integration of key services into the cloud environment across the enterprise.

Enterprise Services Agency (ESA): The Army's Enterprise Services Agency provides products and services in support of the Army, other military departments, the Joint Staff, Office of the Secretary of Defense, and other federal agencies for the Pentagon Community. ESA was integrated from the Office of the Administrative Assistant to the Secretary of the Army to the Office of the Chief Information Officer in November 2022 by Dr. Raj Iyer and codified by an amendment to Army General Order 1 to more accurately align all information management functions in the Army Secretariat under the Office of the Chief Information Officer.

Army Analytics Group (AAG): The Army Analytics Group delivers analytical services to the Army for a broad cross-section of organizational operations and functions, with expertise in cybersecurity, information technology, machine learning, deep learning, natural language processing, and artificial intelligence modeling. The AAG was integrated into the Office of the Chief Information Officer through an agreement between Dr. Raj Iyer and the Undersecretary of the Army, and codified through an amendment to the Army General Order 1 in March 2023.

== Chronological list of Chief Information Officers ==
No.	Deputy Chief of Staff		Term		
No.	Portrait	Name	Took office	Left office	Term length
	Chief Information Officer (SES Civilian)				
1	Raj Iyer	Raj Iyer	2020	2023	3 years
2	Dr. David Markowitz	Dr. David Markowitz	2023	2023	4 months (acting)
3	Mr. Leo Garciga	Mr. Leo Garciga	June 2023	May 2026	47 months
4	Mr. Gabriele Chiulli	Mr. Gabriele Chiulli	May 2026	Current	Incumbent (acting)
