= John B. Morrison =

U.S. Army general

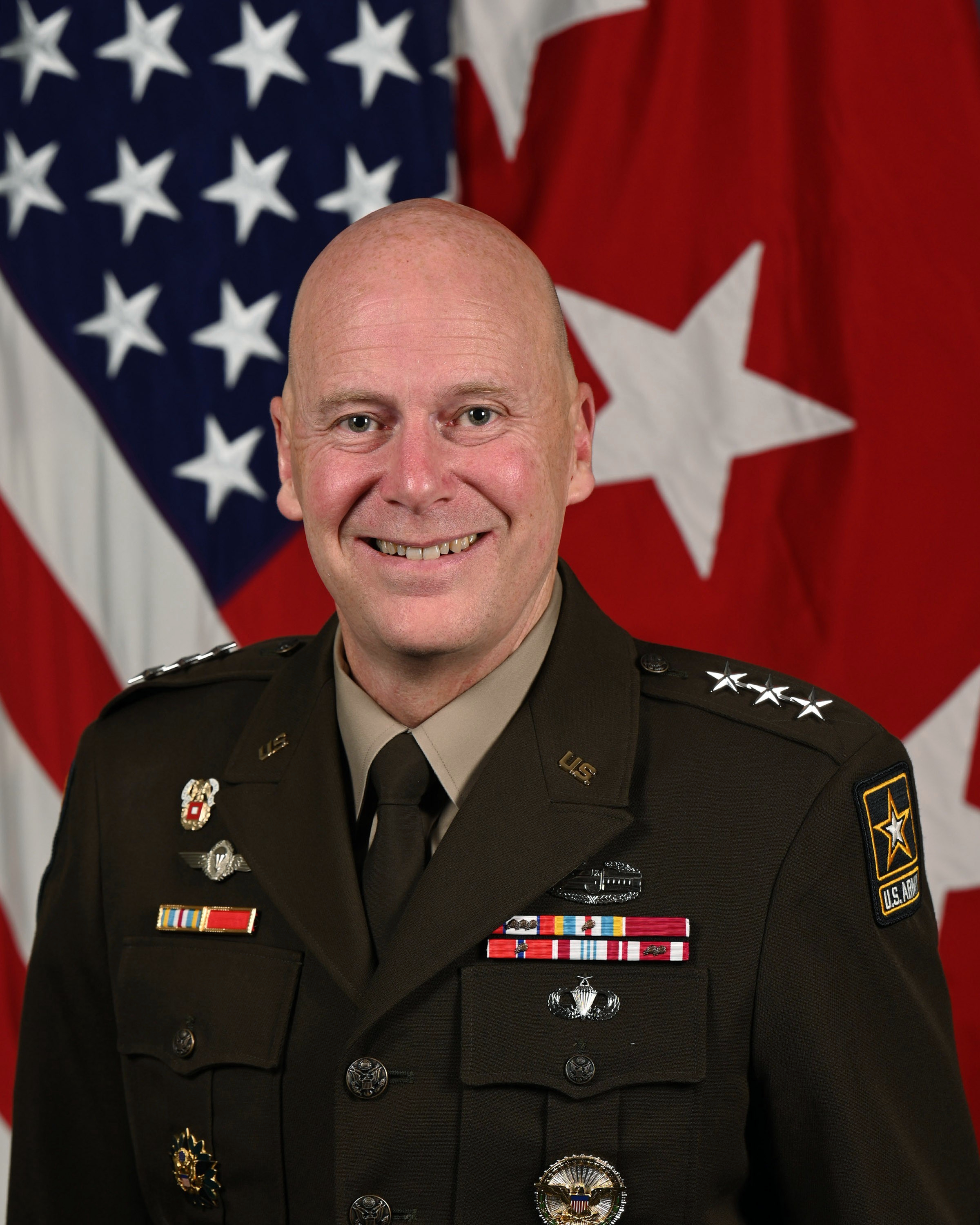
- Military career
- Allegiance: United States
- Branch: United States Army
- Service years: 1986–2024
- Rank: Lieutenant General
- Commands: United States Army Cyber Center of Excellence; Army Network Enterprise Technology Command; 7th Signal Command; Joint Communications Support Element (Airborne)
- Conflicts: Gulf War
- Awards: Army Distinguished Service Medal (4); Defense Superior Service Medal; Legion of Merit; Bronze Star Medal (2)

John Blaine Morrison Jr. is a retired United States Army lieutenant general who last served as the deputy chief of staff for cyber (G-6) of the United States Army. Previously, he was the chief of staff of the United States Cyber Command.

General Morrison has four daughters, Christine Morrison Coffey, Katherine Dodds, Colleen Morrison, and Kelly Shutler. Colleen Morrison is an attorney in Indianapolis, Indiana. She previously clerked for Associate Justice Steven H. David and Associate Justice Derek R. Molter of the Indiana Supreme Court.

Military offices
Preceded by John B. Hildebrand	Commanding General of the 7th Signal Command; 2012–2014	Succeeded by John W. Baker
Preceded by Alan R. Lynn	Commanding General of the Army Network Enterprise Technology Command; 2014–2016	Succeeded by John W. Baker
Preceded by Stephen Fogarty	Commanding General of the United States Army Cyber Center of Excellence; 2016–2019	Succeeded by Neil S. Hersey
Preceded by Ross A. Myers	Chief of Staff of the United States Cyber Command; 2019–2020	Succeeded by David T. Isaacson
Preceded by Bruce T. Crawford	Deputy Chief of Staff for Cyber of the United States Army; 2020–2024	Succeeded by Jeth Rey
