= Jeth Rey =

U.S. Army general officer

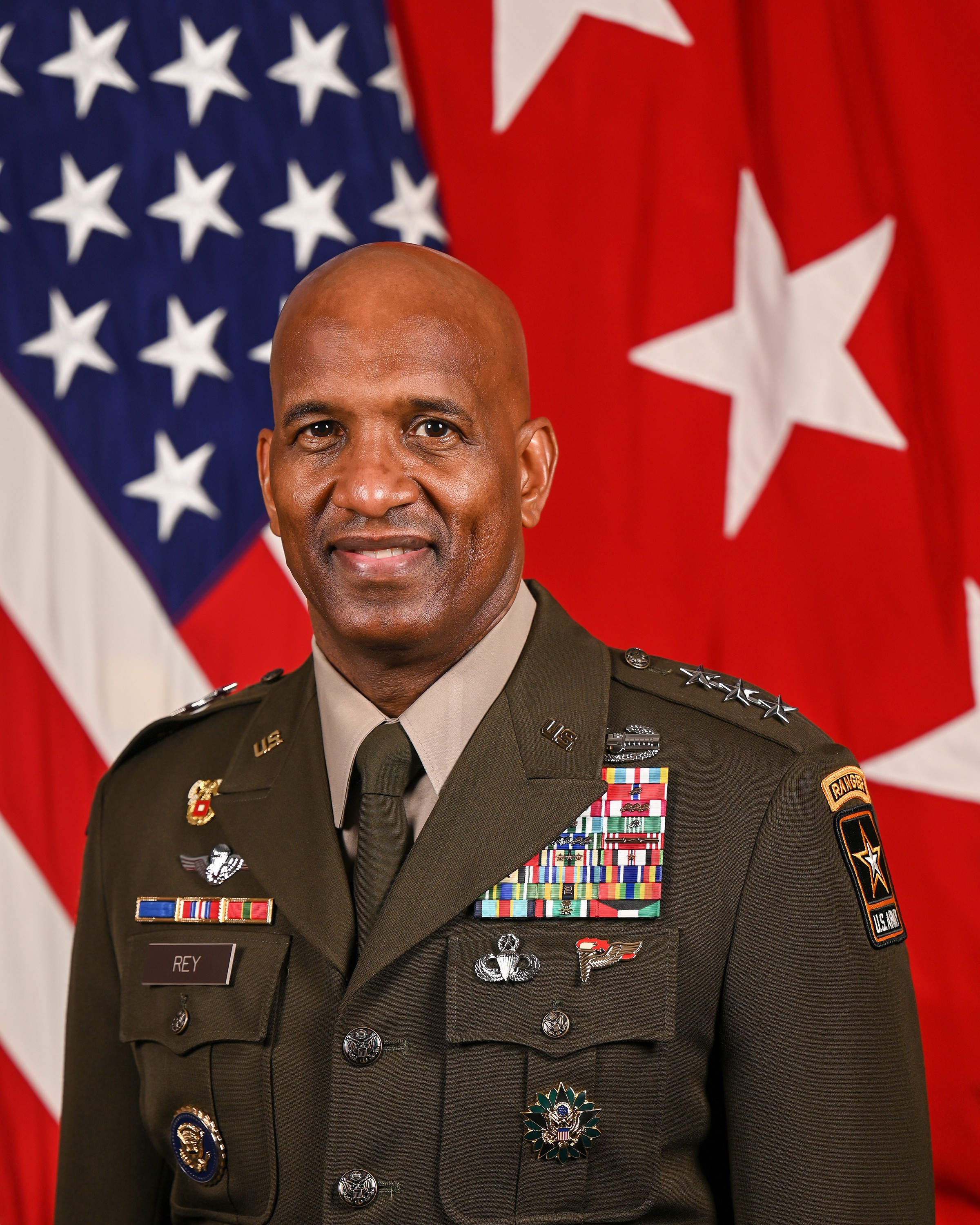
- Official portrait, 2025
- Born: c. 1965 (age 60–61); Saint Thomas, U.S. Virgin Islands
- Military career
- Allegiance: United States
- Branch: United States Army
- Service years: 1983–present
- Rank: Lieutenant General
- Commands: Network Cross-Functional Team; 516th Signal Brigade; 112th Special Operations Signal Battalion; Special Missions Command, White House Communications Agency; Signal Squadron, United States Army Special Operations Command; Alpha Company, 112th Signal Battalion Special Operations (Airborne)
- Awards: Defense Superior Service Medal (4); Bronze Star Medal (2)

Jeth B. Rey (born c. 1965) is a United States Army lieutenant general who has served as the deputy chief of staff for command, control, communications, cyber operations, and networks (G-6) of the United States Army since January 2025. He most recently served as the Director of Architecture, Operations, Networks, and Space of the U.S. Army. He previously served as the director of the Network Cross Functional Team.

In May 2024, Rey was nominated for promotion to lieutenant general and assignment as deputy chief of staff for command, control, communications, cyber operations, and networks of the U.S. Army.

Military offices
New office	Director of the Network Cross Functional Team; 2021–2024	Succeeded by Patrick J. Ellis
Preceded by Jacqueline D. McPhail	Director of Architecture, Operations, Networks, and Space of the United States Army; 2024–2025	Vacant
Preceded by John B. Morrison	Deputy Chief of Staff for Cyber of the United States Army; 2025–present	Incumbent
