= West Catholic Preparatory High School =

Location
- 4501 Chestnut Street; University City; Philadelphia, Pennsylvania 19139; United States; 39°57′26″N 75°12′42″W

Information
- Type: Private, Coeducational
- Motto: United in Faith, Loyalty, Knowledge
- Religious affiliation: Roman Catholic
- Patron saint: St. John Baptiste de la Salle
- Established: 1916
- Oversight: Archdiocese of Philadelphia
- President: Andrew Brady
- Dean: Messiah Reames
- Principal: Michael Field
- Grades: 9-12
- Education system: Archdioceses of Philadelphia
- Campus type: Urban
- Colors: Blue White and Gold
- Slogan: Learn; Compete Create Lead Go West
- Athletics conference: Philadelphia Catholic League
- Sports: Football, Boys Basketball, Girls Basketball, Cheerleading, Indoor Track, Outdoor Track, Girls Volleyball
- Mascot: Burr-Man
- Nickname: West
- Team name: Burrs
- Accreditation: Middle States Association of Colleges and Schools
- Publication: Musings
- School fees: $1,100
- Tuition: $8,900
- Admissions Director: Dominique Fuller-Finley
- Director of Student Life: Dr. John Brennan
- Director of Campus Ministry: Kelly Foley
- Website: www.westcatholic.org

West Catholic Preparatory High School is a co-educational Catholic high school in the Archdiocese of Philadelphia. It is located in Philadelphia, Pennsylvania, at 45th and Chestnut Streets, the University City neighborhood of West Philadelphia.

== History ==
The school opened on September 8, 1989, as a result of a merger between West Philadelphia Catholic High School for Boys, opened in 1916, and West Philadelphia Catholic Girls High School, opened in 1927.

When they originally opened, both West Catholic Girls and West Catholic Boys served students from West Philadelphia, Southwest Philadelphia and Delaware County. As more Archdiocesan high schools opened in the suburbs in the 1950s and 1960s, West's "feeder schools" became limited to parishes in West and Southwest Philadelphia. With the advent of "open enrollment" for Archdiocesan high schools in the 1990s, West Catholic continued to draw from West and Southwest Philadelphia, and also attracted students from Philadelphia and its suburbs. Currently (2011), approximately 25% of the students come from suburban areas, with the other 75% from across the City of Philadelphia.

In 2012, there was a proposal to close the school.

In July 2013, the school announced its official name change to West Catholic Preparatory High School, as part of its overall strategic plan. According to the Pennsylvania Interscholastic Athletic Association, the school's enrollment in 2023-24 was 359.

== Academics ==
Based on the school's student focus and support; a school organization and culture; challenging standards and curriculum; active teaching and receptive learning; professional community; leadership and educational vitality; school, family, community partnerships and many indicators of success, The Blue Ribbon School's Program (in affiliation with the United States Department of Education) has awarded West Catholic the prestigious 'Blue Ribbon School of Excellence'. An Honor of Pride and Esteem achieved several times.

West Philadelphia Catholic High School for Boys was named a Blue Ribbon School of Excellence by the Blue Ribbon Schools program in the academic year of 1983-1984 Co-Educational West Philadelphia Catholic High School was also named a Blue Ribbon School of Excellence by the Blue Ribbon Schools program in the academic years of 1994-1996.

West Catholic graduates have gone on to Swarthmore, NYU, Georgetown, Columbia, Stanford, Harvard, and the University of Pennsylvania, among others. West Catholic graduates earned scholarships such as Hispanic Heritage Youth Awards, Gates Millennium Scholarships, Nelson Scholarships, Mayor's Scholarships, and an F.C. Haab Science Scholarship.

=== The Brothers of the Christian Schools ===
West Catholic's faculty includes a number of Catholic religious orders, most notably, the Institute of the Brothers of the Christian Schools, also known as the Christian Brothers. The Christian Brothers are a Roman Catholic lay religious teaching order, founded by French Priest Saint Jean-Baptiste de La Salle. De La Salle was a canon of the cathedral and came from a wealthy family. De La Salle's goal was setting up free schools where the children of the working and poor class citizens could learn reading, writing and arithmetic and also receive religious instruction and other training appropriate for forming good Christians.

The Christian Brothers taught at West Catholic Boys beginning in 1926 (succeeding the Brothers of Mary). Sisters, Servants of the Immaculate Heart of Mary (IHM) and the Sisters of St. Joseph (Chestnut Hill) are two of the women's religious teaching orders from West Catholic Girls. In addition to the religious orders, the school's faculty includes a number of lay teachers. The Chaplain is a priest of the Archdiocese of Philadelphia.

=== Partnerships ===
As a resident of the University City, West Catholic Preparatory High School has taken advantage of its unique location by establishing a partnership with several universities in Philadelphia:

- University of Pennsylvania
- Drexel University
- University of the Sciences of Philadelphia

== Athletics ==
West Catholic is a member of the Philadelphia Catholic League Blue Division, which comprises schools with smaller enrollment. They currently offer the following sports at the varsity level:

- Girls' Volleyball
- Football
- Cheerleading
- Boys' Basketball
- Girls' Basketball
- Girls' Indoor/Outdoor Track
- Boys' Indoor/Outdoor Track
- Cross-Country

=== Football championship history ===
West Catholic has won several football championships. The following is a listing of the championship wins, the year they were won, and the winning head coach:

- Tom Tracey- 1925
- Jocko McGarry- 1932
- Bob Dougherty- 1940, 1941, 1943, 1944
- Bill McCoy- 1945, 1946
- Jack Shields- 1951
- Vince McAneny- 1962
- John McAneny- 1965
- Brian Fluck- 2006, 2007, 2008, 2009, 2010, 2011, 2012, 2013, 2015, 2016

State AA Champion 2010

=== Basketball ===
West Catholic has won a number of men's basketball championships:

- Brother Michael Quinlan- 1921
- Jocko McGarry- 1931
- Pat Conway- 1938
- Joe Langan- 1949
- Jim Usilton, Jr- 1952, 1953, 1955
- Bill Ludlow- 1959

In 1971 West Philadelphia Catholic High School for Girls won the city championship at the Palestra.

In 1974 West Philadelphia Catholic High School for Girls won the city championship.

== Notable alumni ==
- Nia Ali, female sprinter, silver medalist at Rio Olympics in 2016 on 100 metres hurdles
- Ernie Beck, a former member of the Philadelphia Warriors 1955-56 NBA Champions, All American 1953, held the University of Pennsylvania Most Points for more than 50 years and still holds most rebounds record at the University of Pennsylvania, NCAA 1951 leading Rebounder
- Peter Boyle, actor
- Michael Brooks, former NBA basketball player and captain of 1980 Olympic Basketball team
- John D. Caputo, philosopher and theologian, Thomas J. Watson Professor of Religion Emeritus at Syracuse University and David R. Cook Professor of Philosophy Emeritus at Villanova University
- Tom Cosgrove (1930–2017), college All-American football player
- Francine, professional wrestling personality (ECW) and podcaster.
- Big Daddy Graham (1953–2021), comedian, writer, actor, recording artist and sports radio personality on 94 WIP-FM.
- Philip Hart, former United States Senator (D-Michigan) and lawyer
- Jack Jones (1949-1991), first Black news anchor in Philadelphia, noted for his coverage of the 1985 MOVE bombing
- Jim Lynam, CSN Philly analyst and former collegiate and NBA basketball coach
- Herb Magee, head basketball coach for Philadelphia University and former NBA basketball player
- Joseph Mark McShea, founding bishop of Allentown
- Gerry Mulligan: Jazz Legend (Baritone Sax)
- Jim Murray, co-founder of the Ronald McDonald House and a former general manager of the Philadelphia Eagles
- Malcolm Nance, U.S. Navy senior chief petty officer, author, television commentator
- John Joseph Cardinal O'Connor, Archbishop of New York, 1984-2000.
- Peter O'Keefe, Pennsylvania State Representative, 1975-1978
- Jon Polito: Actor (Multiple Coen Bros. movies including Miller's Crossing and The Big Lebowski
- Thomas Rienzi, Lt. General US Army and Catholic Deacon
- Jaelen Strong, NFL wide receiver for the Houston Texans
- Curtis Brinkley, NFL Player for San Diego Chargers and Music executive.
- Jim Washington, a former NBA basketball player
- Paul Westhead, Coached champion teams in both NBA and WNBA.

== Student body ==
There are 427 students attending West Catholic:

Ethnicity

- Black - 80%
- White - 3%
- Asian - 6%
- Hispanic - 11%
- Other
