= Attorney General Doyle =

Attorney General Doyle may refer to:

- Brian Andre Doyle (1911–2004), Attorney General of Fiji
- Jim Doyle (born 1945), Attorney General of Wisconsin

== See also ==
- General Doyle (disambiguation)
