= Robert L. Edmonson II =

United States Army retired general

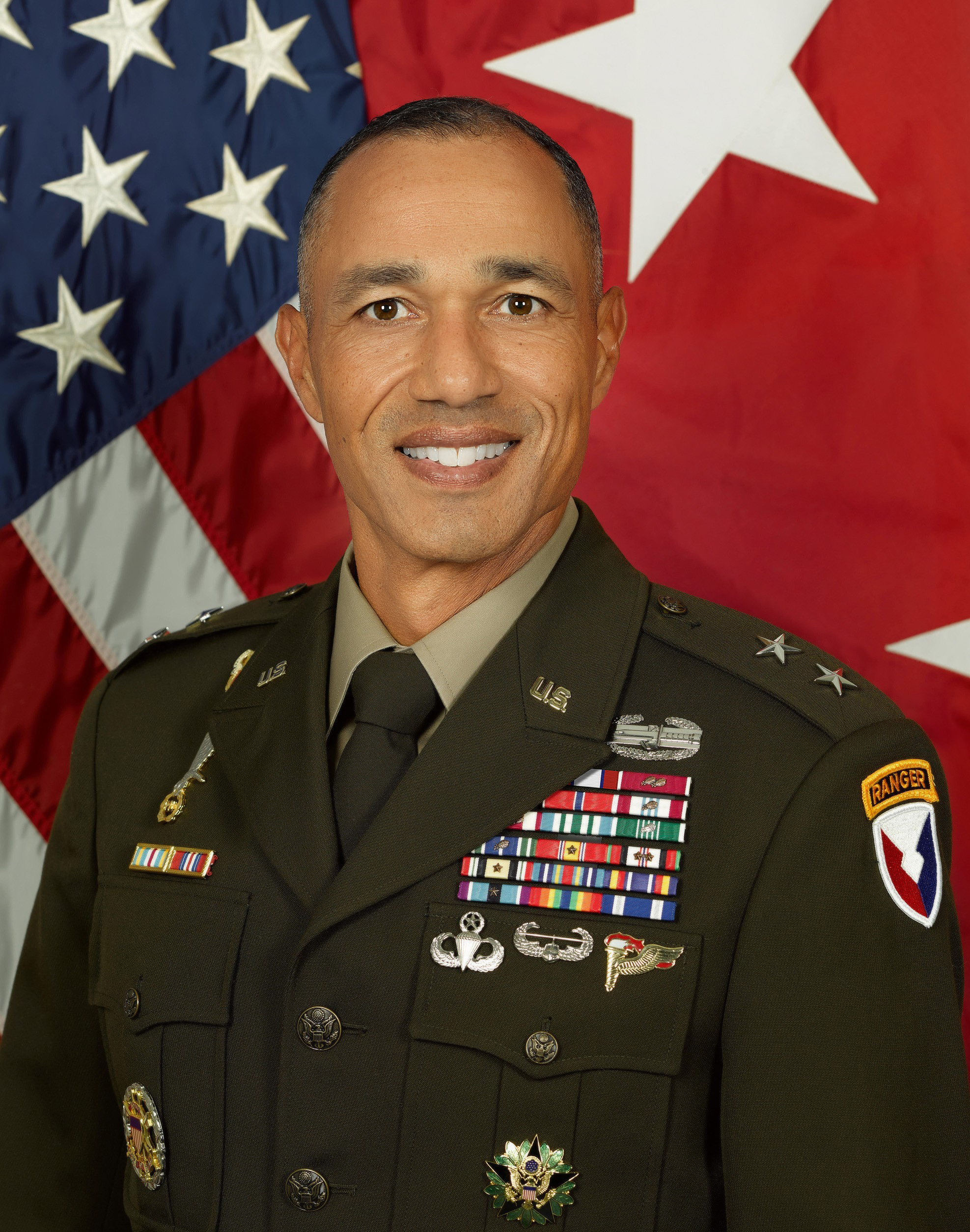
- Born: 1966 (age 59–60); Fürth, Germany
- Allegiance: United States of America
- Branch: United States Army
- Service years: 1991–2024
- Rank: Major general
- Commands: United States Army Communications-Electronics Command
- Conflicts: Iraq War; Afghan War

Robert L. Edmonson II (born 1966) is a retired United States Army two-star general who last served as the Commanding General of the United States Army Communications-Electronics Command and Senior Commander of Aberdeen Proving Ground in Maryland from August 6, 2021, to June 7, 2024.

== Early life and education ==
Edmonson was born in 1966 in Fürth, Germany. He is a biological son of an American soldier and German mother and was placed for adoption without the knowledge of his biological father. He was adopted in 1967 by another U.S. Army Soldier, Robert L. Edmonson, and his Austrian wife, Margaret K. Edmonson. He grew up in Willingboro, New Jersey.

Edmonson attended Frostburg State University in Maryland, where he was introduced to the Army R.O.T.C during a visit to play college football. While attending Frostburg State, Edmonson played college football and participated in Alpha Phi Alpha fraternity. He was commissioned as a Second Lieutenant (Infantry) and graduated with a degree in business marketing in 1990.

Edmonson also holds an associate's degree in business administration from Burlington County College, a Master of Science Administration in information resource management from Central Michigan University and a Master of Science in national security strategy from the National Defense University. In 2022, Frostburg State University granted him an Honorary Doctor of Humane Letters.

== Military career ==
Edmonson was commissioned as a second lieutenant through Frostburg State University's ROTC program in 1991. He began his military career in 1991 as a Rifle Platoon Leader in the 101st Airborne Division at Fort Campbell, Kentucky.

In 1993, Edmonson transitioned to the Signal Corps, serving as a Signal Platoon Leader and Assistant S-3 in the 501st Signal Battalion, Fort Campbell, Kentucky. As a captain in the 82nd Airborne Division at Fort Bragg, he held multiple roles including Infantry Brigade Signal Officer, Division Radio Officer, and Commander of Alpha Company, 82nd Signal Battalion, Fort Bragg, North Carolina.

In 2000, Edmonson was selected to serve in the Chairman of the Joint Chiefs of Staff Internship Program, contributing to the Joint Staff J-6 and the Army Staff CIO/G-6, Pentagon.

As a Major, Edmonson returned to the 82nd Airborne Division, serving as an Infantry Brigade Signal Officer and deploying in support of Operation Enduring Freedom and Operation Iraqi Freedom. He later served as the Deputy G-6 and Battalion Executive Officer of the 82nd Signal Battalion from 2004 to 2006, where he deployed to support humanitarian recovery efforts following Hurricane Katrina.

As a Lieutenant Colonel, Edmonson served on the Joint Staff, J-6, Pentagon. He commanded the 63rd Expeditionary Signal Battalion and served as a Senior Military Advisor to the Minister of Interior (Sustainment) in Kabul, Afghanistan during Operation Enduring Freedom.

As a Colonel, Edmonson was the Army Chief Information Officer/G-6 (CIO/G-6) and Director of Army Signal Activity at the United States Army Intelligence and Security Command (INSCOM). He commanded the 35th Signal Brigade, XVIII Airborne Corps from 2013 to 2015. He later became Executive Officer to the Army CIO/G-6.

In 2016, Edmonson was appointed the 38th Chief of Signal and Signal Commandant, where he was responsible for the education and leader development of 11,000 students, annually. In 2017, Edmonson was promoted to brigadier general.

In 2018, Edmonson became Deputy Chief of Staff, CIO/G-6, U.S. Army Forces Command at Fort Bragg in North Carolina. In 2021, Edmonson was promoted to major general.

Edmonson served the 17th commander of the U.S. Army Communications-Electronics Command and Senior Commander of Aberdeen Proving Ground from August 6, 2021, to June 7, 2024.

== Awards and decorations ==
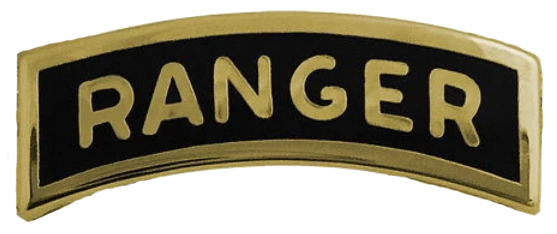
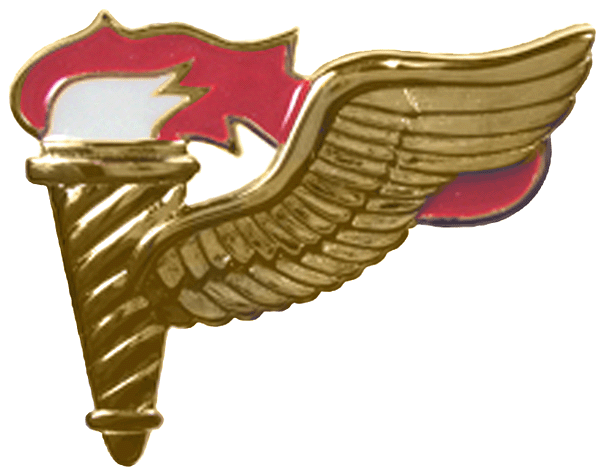
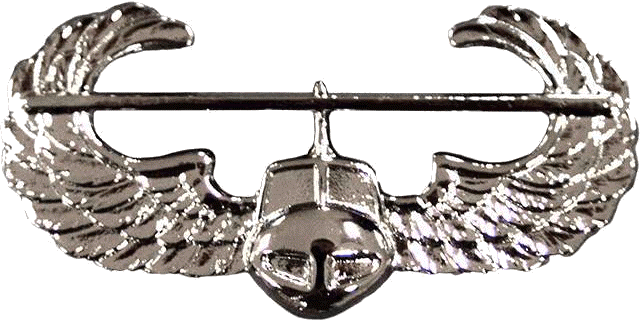
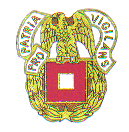
Combat Action Badge
Expert Infantryman Badge
Ranger tab
Master Parachutist Badge
Pathfinder Badge
Air Assault Badge
Joint Staff Identification Badge
Army Staff Identification Badge
82d Airborne Division Combat Service Identification Badge
NATO-A Combat Service Identification Badge
Army Signal Corps Distinctive Unit Insignia
Distinguished Service Medal
Legion of Merit with three bronze oak leaf clusters
Bronze Star Medal
Defense Meritorious Service Medal with one bronze oak leaf cluster
Meritorious Service Medal with three bronze oak leaf clusters
Joint Service Commendation Medal
Army Commendation Medal with one silver oak leaf cluster
Army Achievement Medal with one bronze oak leaf cluster
National Defense Service Medal with one service star
Afghanistan Campaign Medal with two service stars
Iraq Campaign Medal with star
Global War on Terrorism Expeditionary Medal
Global War on Terrorism Service Medal
Humanitarian Service Medal with one bronze oak leaf cluster
Army Service Ribbon
NATO Medal
Valorous Unit Award
Joint Meritorious Unit Award
