= General Doyle (1803 ship) =

History

United Kingdom
- Name: General Doyle
- Namesake: Sir John Doyle, 1st Baronet
- Launched: 1803, Looe
- Captured: August 1814
- Fate: Burnt August 1814

General characteristics
- Tons burthen: 83, or 8337/94 (bm)
- Length: 57 ft 8 in (17.6 m)
- Beam: 19 ft 3 in (5.9 m)
- Depth of hold: 9 ft 0 in (2.7 m)
- Sail plan: Cutter
- Complement: 1805: 40; 1806: 40; 1810: 9
- Armament: 1805: 8 × 4&6-pounder guns; 1806: 8 × 4&6-pounder guns; 1810: 4 x 3-pounder guns
- Notes: Clinker-built

General Doyle was launched at Looe in 1803, and registered in Guernsey later that year. Between January 1805 and September 1806 she sailed as a privateer. Between October 1806 to November 1809 she became a packet boat in the Post Office Packet Service, sailing between Weymouth and the Channel Islands. From 1810 she became a merchant ship. In August 1813, she survived a maritime incident. An American privateer captured and burnt her in 1814.

== Career ==
On 18 February 1804, General Doyle was in the Roads when she had to cut her cables in a storm.

On 7 January 1805, Captain Samuel David acquired a letter of marque. The size of her crew indicates that she was sailing as a privateer. Later, as a packet or merchant vessel, she had a crew of fewer than 10 men. As a privateer, the extra men above the number required to sail her where there to act as prize crews on any vessels she would capture.

Captain William Tardiff acquired a letter of marque on 22 May 1806. He too had a large crew.

General Doyle, formerly under the command of Captain William Tardiff, was offered for sale on 18 September 1806.

General Doyle became a packet, sailing between Weymouth and the Channel Islands. She served from October 1806 to November 1809. Once she joined the Weymouth Packet Service, first under Captain Ed Billot and then later Captain Pipon, she permitted the service to make two voyages per week. General Doyle sailed every Wednesday. The fare from Weymouth to Guernsey was £1 6s 6d.

On 6 June 1807, General Doyle closed out her Guernsey registry and was re-registered at Weymouth. She first appeared in the Weymouth register in June 1807, with Pipon as owner and Isaac Malzard as master, but the only master mentioned in the Post Office records is Charles Pipon.

After November 1809 she was withdrawn from service. The Gazette de Guernesey carried the advertisement: "General Doyle packet, built 1803, copper fastened, 83 tons. The hull to be sold December, 1809 in consequence of a late Post Office regulation not allowing clinker built vessels to be employed in the service on account of the Smuggling Act. Apply Captain Pipon, Weymouth, Francis Janvrin of Jersey, or Messrs. Cary and Macullock of Guernsey". (Note: Several sources confuse the subsequent history of the General Doyle of this article with another General Doyle. Unfortunately for researchers, General Doyle was a common name at the time.)

Captain Charles Hocquart acquired a letter of marque on 21 August 1810. Her owner was David King. Under Captain C. Hocquard she traded between Guernsey and Lisbon, and with St Michaels.

Her owner sold General Doyle in 1813, and she began trading between Bristol and Bermuda.

On 4 August over 50 vessels were damaged in a hurricane at Bermuda. Among them was the cutter, General Doyle, from Bristol, which was full of water.

== Fate ==
In August 1814, Lloyd's List reported that the United States privateer Neuchatel had captured General Doyle and burnt her, after taking out the most valuable part of her cargo. General Doyle had been sailing from Leghorn to Bristol with a cargo of oil.
