= Clay Buckingham =

United States Army general

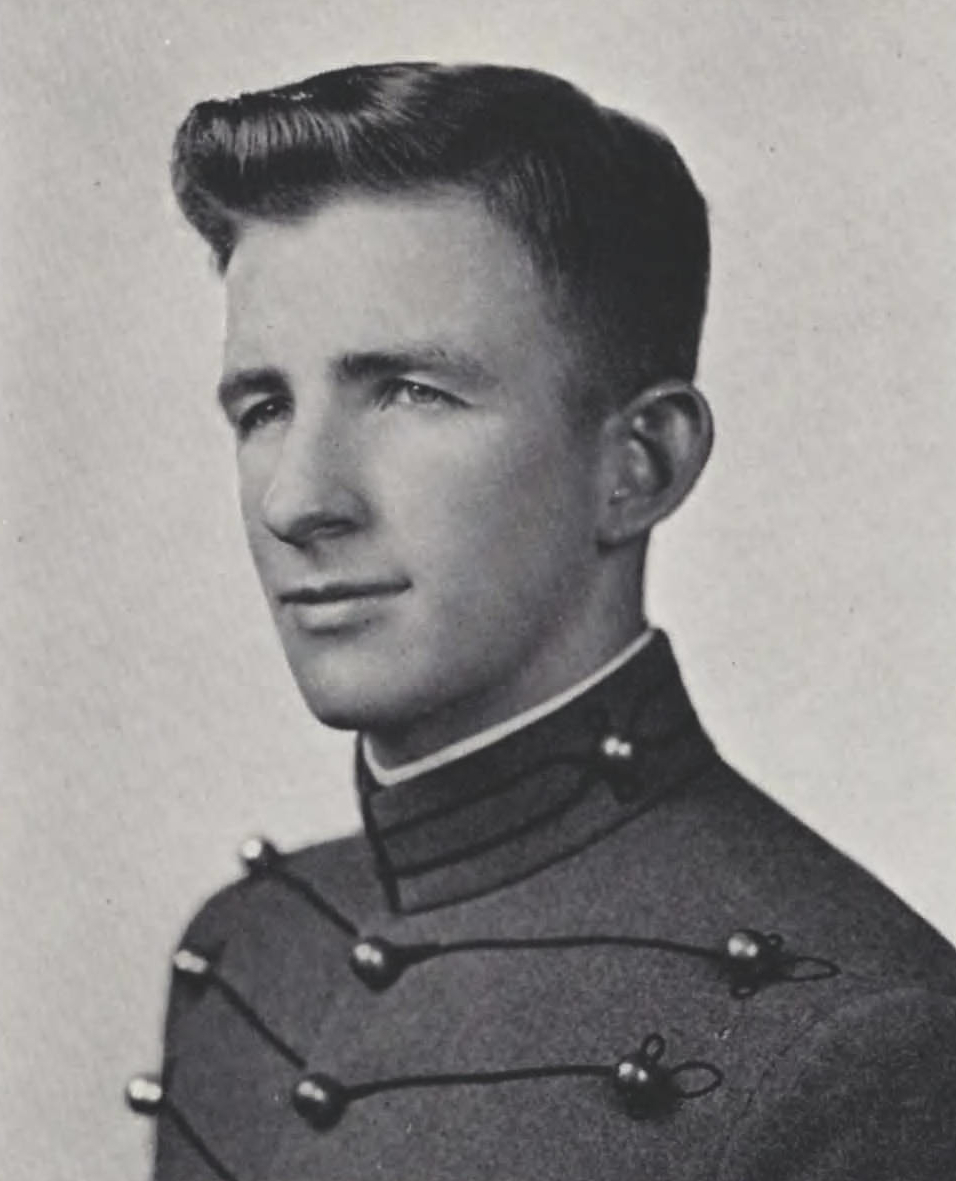
- Buckingham as a West Point cadet c. 1949
- Born: Clay Thompson Buckingham; June 8, 1927 (age 98); Vero Beach, Florida, U.S.
- Allegiance: United States of America
- Branch: United States Army
- Service years: 1949–1982
- Rank: Major general
- Commands: Assistant Chiefs of Staff for Automation and Communications

Clay Thompson Buckingham (born June 8, 1927) is a United States Army major general who served as Assistant Chief of Staff for Automation and Communications/Assistant Deputy Chief of Staff for Operations (Command & Control, Communications, Computers) of the United States Army from 1979 to 1982. He graduated from the United States Military Academy in 1949.
