= Thomas Rienzi =

United States Army general (1919–2010)

Thomas M. Rienzi
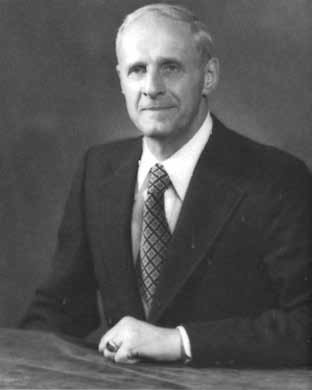
- Thomas Rienzi in 1980
- Born: February 5, 1919; Philadelphia, Pennsylvania, U.S.
- Died: December 15, 2010 (aged 91); Honolulu, Hawaii, U.S.
- Burial place: National Memorial Cemetery of the Pacific
- Military career
- Allegiance: United States of America
- Branch: United States Army
- Service years: 1942–1979
- Rank: Lieutenant general
- Nickname: "Big Tom"
- Unit: U.S. Army Signal Corps
- Commands: 1st Signal Brigade; 51st Signal Battalion
- Conflicts: World War II; Korean War; Vietnam War

Thomas Matthew Rienzi (February 5, 1919 – December 15, 2010) was a lieutenant general in the U.S. Army Signal Corps who served during World War II, the Korean War and Vietnam War. He implemented the modernization of signal units from the usage of just wire and radio, through the growth of strategic satellite communications, to the integration of computer systems at even the tactical level.

== Early life and education ==
Rienzi was born on February 5, 1919, in Philadelphia, Pennsylvania, the son of successful clothiers Luigi and Ethel Rienzi. Graduating from West Philadelphia Catholic High School, he accepted an appointment to the United States Military Academy at West Point, from which he graduated in 1942. From there, he was assigned to the Army Signal Corps.

== Career ==
=== World War II ===
After graduating from Fort Monmouth's Signal Center and School he was assigned to the China-Burma-India Campaign. From there he was transferred to command a company in the 96th Signal Battalion of the 96th Infantry Division. In 1945 he attended the Command and General Staff College, then taught at the Signal School in Fort Monmouth, New Jersey.

=== Interwar Years ===
Rienzi returned from World War II to his hometown and married Clare Moore in 1946. They would later have two children, Thomas Rienzi Jr. and daughter Sherri. He received his master's degree in electrical engineering from the University of Illinois in 1948. Assigned to the Armed Forces Special Weapons Project at Sandia Base, New Mexico, he trained atomic weapons technicians, planning and implementing over 40 test detonations. He then served as a tactical instructor at the United States Military Academy at West Point in 1955. He became commander of the 51st Signal Battalion in Korea in 1957. After this, he was assigned to the Joint Planning and Army Logistics at the Senior United States Headquarters at Honolulu, Hawaii. From 1961 to 1963, Rienzi was appointed Signal Officer for Eighteenth Airborne Corps. His next assignment from 1963 to 1965 was as Executive Officer to the Chief Signal Officer and Chief of Communications-Electronics, United States Army.

=== The Vietnam War ===
In May 1966, Rienzi was promoted to brigadier general and assigned as Commanding General and Commandant of the United States Army Signal Center and School at Fort Monmouth, New Jersey, the largest United States Army school. During his assignment at Fort Monmouth he received a Master of Arts degree in international affairs from George Washington University and a certificate in business management from Pittsburgh University. In 1968, after the Tet Offensive, Rienzi was promoted to major general and given the command of the 23,000 soldiers of the 1st Signal Brigade. During this time the Army implemented new generations of electronically secured voice communications systems, and Rienzi and his staff oversaw its integration and implementation. This integration was complicated by implementing the program of Vietnamization of duties and resources.

== Later life and death ==
In 1970, Rienzi was assigned as commander of the Strategic Communications Command of the Pacific at Fort Shafter in Honolulu, Hawaii. In June 1972, he was made the Chief Signal Officer of the U.S. Army. In August 1977, he was promoted to lieutenant general, assuming the position of Deputy Director General, Chief of Staff, and Chief Engineer of the NATO Integrated Communications System Management Agency in Brussels, Belgium. Approaching retirement from army life, he attended seminaries in Washington, D.C. and Louvain, Belgium and was ordained a Roman Catholic deacon in April 1979 by Cardinal Terence Cook in Heidelberg, Germany. Reinzi retired from active duty in July 1979 and began to serve as a deacon in Hawaii.

Rienzi died on December 15, 2010, at Tripler Army Medical Center, Honolulu, Hawaii, and was buried in the National Memorial Cemetery of the Pacific.

== Awards ==
Rienzi received the Distinguished Service Medal, two awards of the Legion of Merit, two Bronze Star Medals and six Air Medals. He was presented the International Meritorious Service Award by the Armed Forces Communications and Electronics Association and the Medical Corps Award of Merit for his hospital ministry as a deacon at Tripler Army Medical Center.

== Legacy ==
Rienzi is survived by his daughter (his wife and son having passed on already), three grandchildren, seven great-grandchildren and five great-great-grandchildren. Rienzi commanded units of the United States Army's most technical branch during the transition from wire and cable, vacuum tube radio and visual signals, through the advent of transistorized radio, teletype, electronically secured voice communications and satellite communications.
