= Thurman D. Rodgers =

United States Army general (1934–2022)

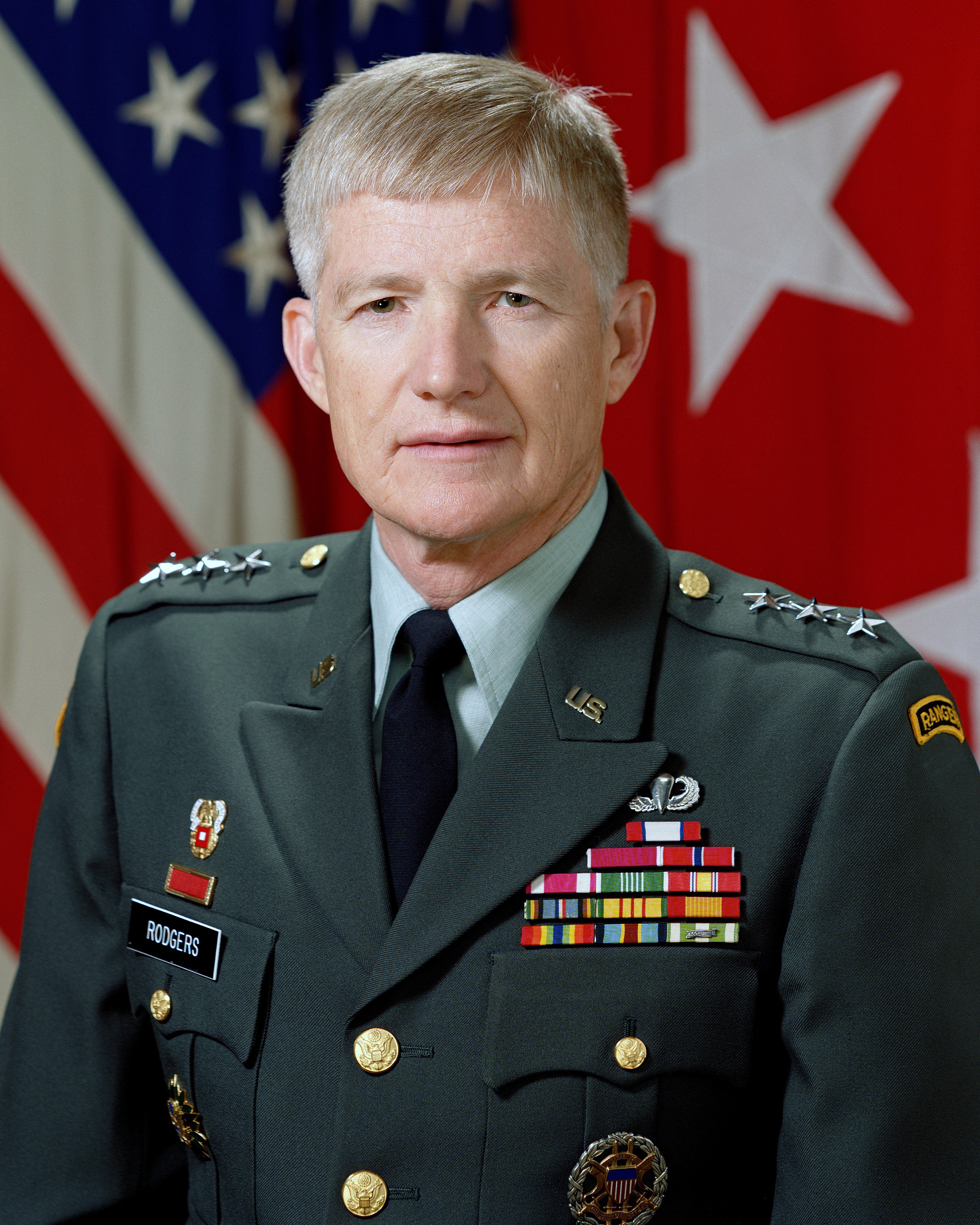
- Born: December 1, 1934; Cookeville, Tennessee, U.S.
- Died: June 9, 2022 (aged 87); Chattanooga, Tennessee, U.S.
- Military career
- Allegiance: United States
- Branch: United States Army
- Service years: 1957–1991
- Rank: Lieutenant general
- Nickname: Don
- Commands: United States Army Information Systems Command; United States Army Signal Center; 7th Signal Brigade
- Conflicts: Vietnam War
- Awards: Distinguished Service Medal; Legion of Merit; Bronze Star Medal; Meritorious Service Medal

Thurman Donell Rodgers (December 1, 1934 – June 9, 2022) was a lieutenant general in the United States Army. His assignments included Commanding General of the United States Army Information Systems Command, United States Army Signal Center and Fort Gordon. Rodgers attended the Tennessee Polytechnic Institute, graduating in 1957 with a B.S. degree in electrical engineering. He later earned an M.A. degree in public administration from the University of Northern Colorado.

From March 1979 to April 1981, Rodgers served as commanding officer of the 7th Signal Brigade. In April 1982, he was given command of the U.S. Army Communications Systems Agency at Fort Monmouth, New Jersey, and the U.S. Army Communication-Electronics Engineering Installation Agency at Fort Huachuca, Arizona. In September 1983, he became the commanding officer of the U.S. Army Signal Center and Fort Gordon, as well as commandant of the U.S. Army Signal School, in Augusta, Georgia.

== Personal ==
Rodgers is the son of Lester Donell Rodgers and Johnie Dellard (McBroom) Rodgers.

Rodgers married Wanda Faye Bohannon on December 28, 1956, in Cookeville, Tennessee. The couple had one son. Faye Rodgers died from a heart attack in Northern Virginia.

On June 3, 1989, Rodgers remarried with Virginia June Scobee (née Kent), the widow of Space Shuttle Challenger commander Dick Scobee, in Arlington County, Virginia. June Scobee Rodgers is a retired university professor.
