= David K. Doyle =

American Army general (1931–2021)

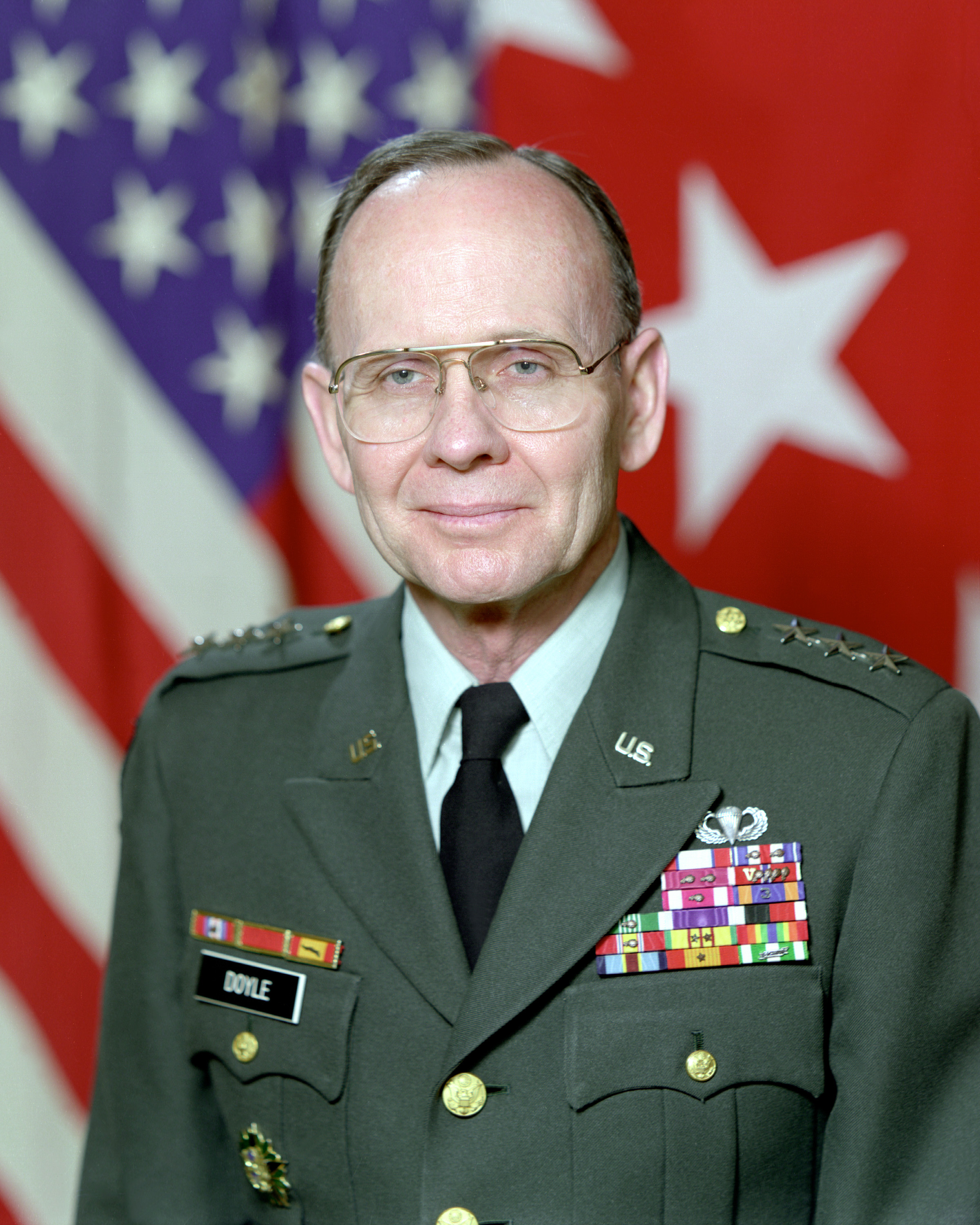
- Born: 8 December 1931 (age 94); Pottsville, Pennsylvania U.S.
- Died: May 8, 2021 (aged 89); Austin, Texas
- Military career
- Allegiance: United States
- Branch: United States Army
- Service years: 1950s–1980s
- Rank: Lieutenant general
- Commands: Assistant Chief of Staff for Information Management
- Conflicts: Vietnam War
- Awards: Distinguished Service Medal; Silver Star (3); Legion of Merit (3)

David Kyte Doyle (8 December 1931 – 8 May 2021) was a lieutenant general in the United States Army who served as Assistant Chief of Staff for Information Management. An alumnus of the University of Maryland, he was commissioned following completion of Officer Candidate School. Doyle received a B.S. degree in military science from the University of Maryland, an M.S. degree in international relations from George Washington University and a Master of Military Arts and Sciences degree from the U.S. Army Command and General Staff College.
