= US Army Cyber Protection Brigade =

Cyber brigade of the United States Army

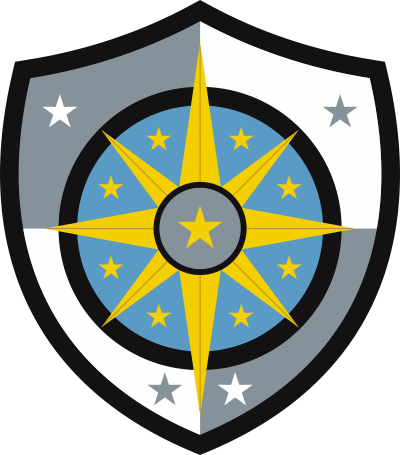
- Shoulder Sleeve Insignia
- Active: 2015 - present
- Country: United States
- Branch: United States Army
- Type: Cyber
- Role: Cyberwarfare
- Size: Brigade
- Part of: United States Army Cyber Command
- Garrison/HQ: Fort Gordon, Georgia
- Nickname: Hunter Brigade
- Motto: "Omnes Ire" (Go Anywhere)
- Website: www.arcyber.mil

Commanders
- Current commander: COL Timothy Sikora
- Command Sergeant Major: CSM Danny J. Hurst

Insignia
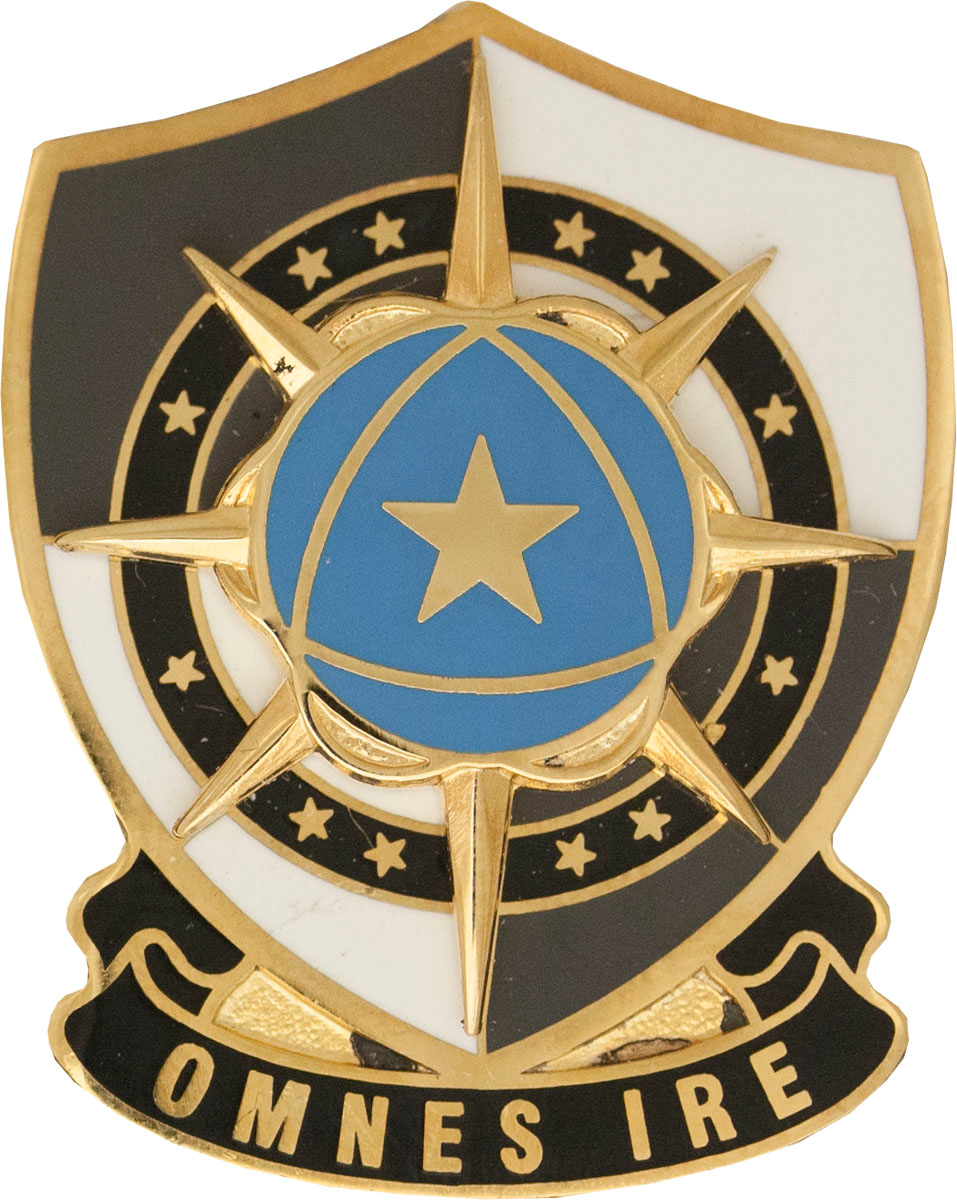
- Distinctive unit insignia

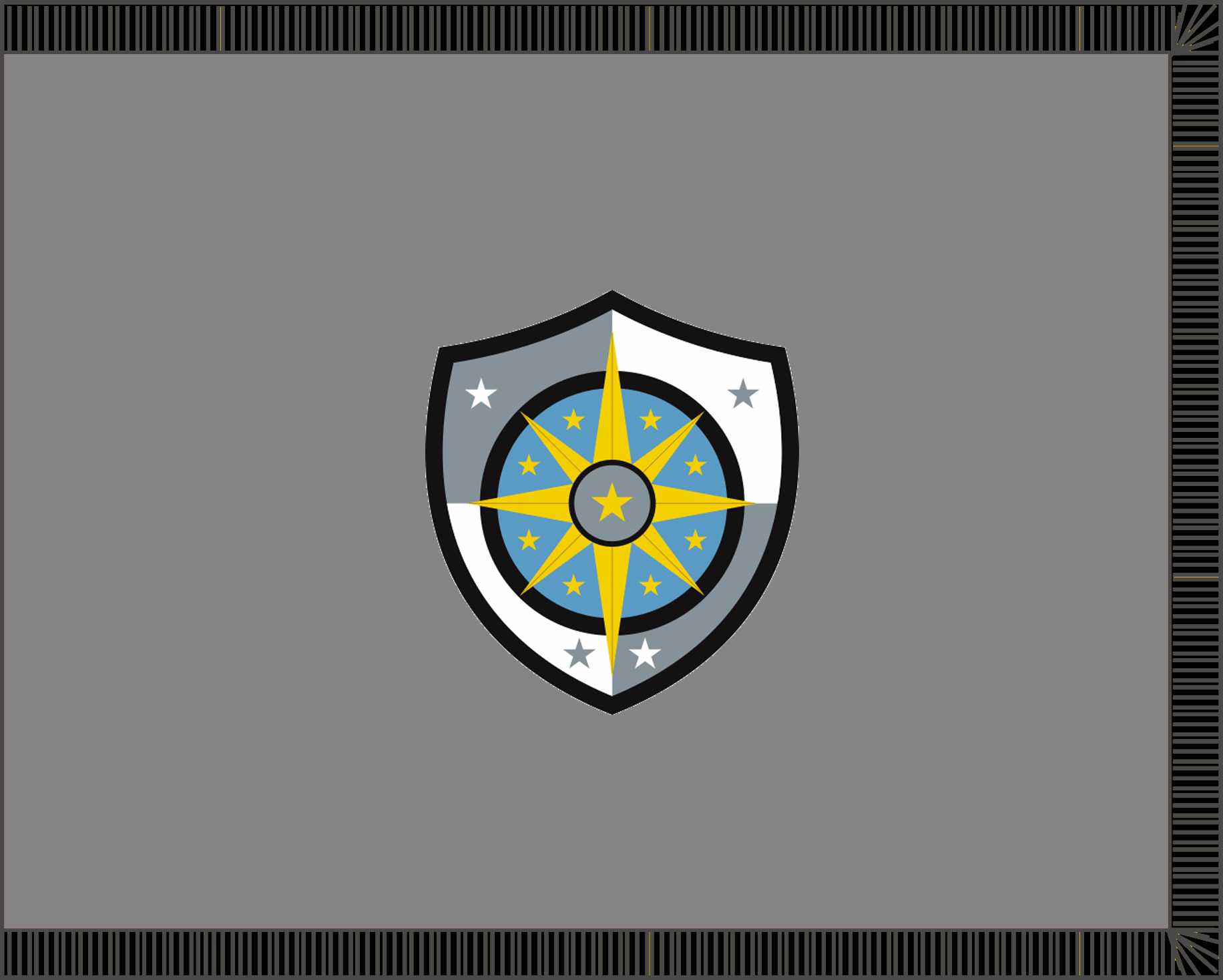
- US Army Cyber Protection Brigade Flag

The Cyber Protection Brigade (CPB) ("Hunter Brigade") is a United States Army cyber defence brigade located in Fort Gordon, Georgia, founded in 2015. The CPB has three subordinate units as of 2025, including the 1st Cyber Battalion, 2nd Cyber Battalion, and the 60th Signal Battalion.

The brigade forms and trains Cyber Protection Teams that deploy to support and safeguarding network systems and data; provide defensive readiness assessments; harden networks; and conduct defensive cyber operations. Cyber protection teams also conduct “hunt forward operations” to improve cybersecurity and identify malware before it affects networks.

== Headquarters ==
The headquarters is in Fort Gordon, Georgia which is also the home of the United States Army Cyber Command (ARCYBER) since March 2020.

== See also ==
- United States Army Cyber Command
- United States Army 91st Cyber Brigade
- United States 780th Military intelligence Brigade
