= General Hernandez =

General Hernandezor Hernández may refer to:

- Rhett A. Hernandez (born 1953), U.S. Army lieutenant general
- Adriano Hernández (1870–1925), Filipino revolutionary general
- José Manuel Hernández (1853–1921), Venezuelan Army general
- Joseph Marion Hernández (1788–1857), U.S. Army brigadier general
