= US Army Reserve Cyber Protection Brigade =

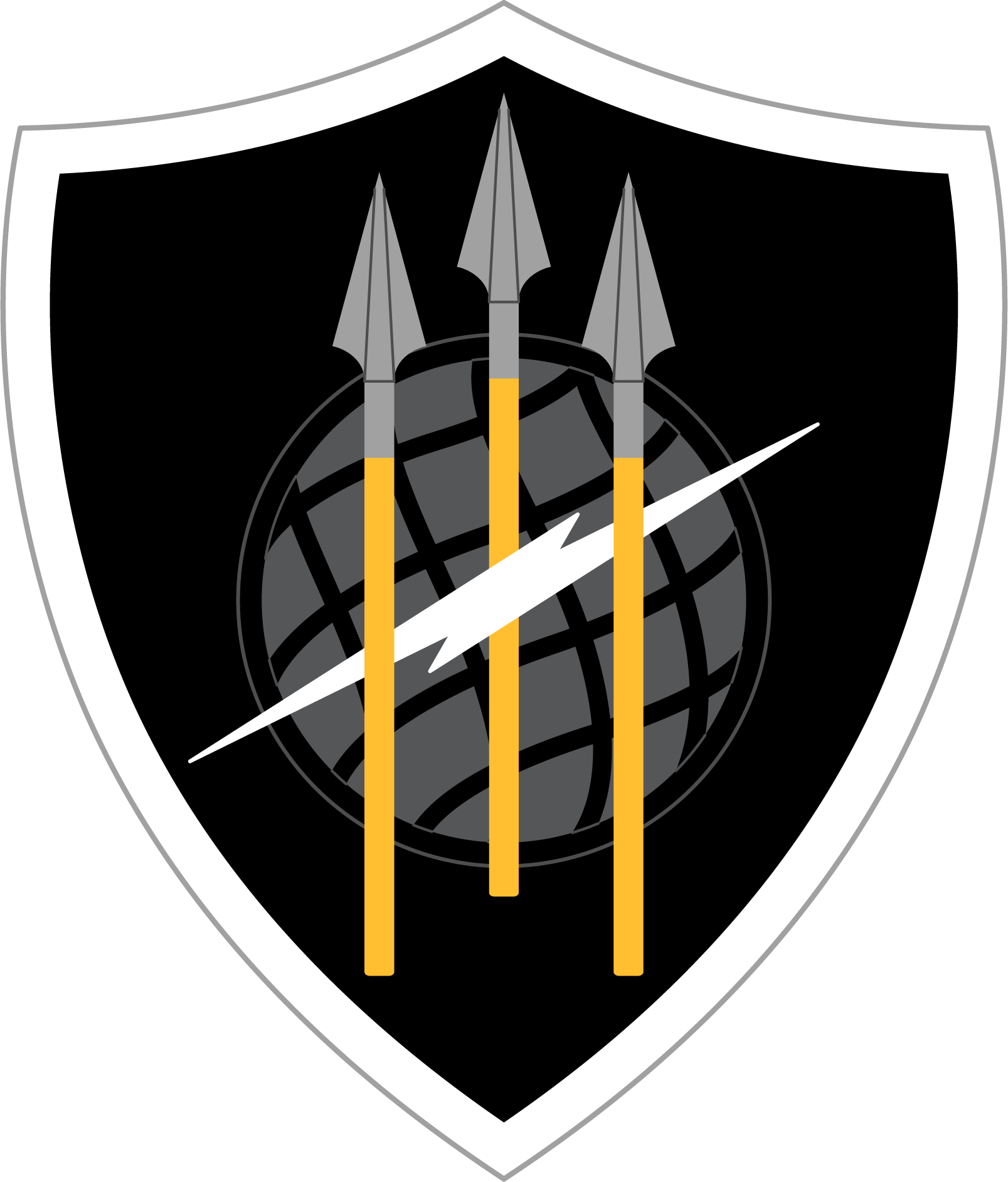
- Active: 2017 - present
- Country: United States
- Branch: United States Army Reserve
- Role: Cyber
- Size: Brigade
- Part of: United States Army Cyber Command
- Garrison/HQ: Adelphi, Maryland

Commanders
- Current commander: Col. Andrew V. Walsh
- Command Sergeant Major: CSM Edinri Magege

Insignia
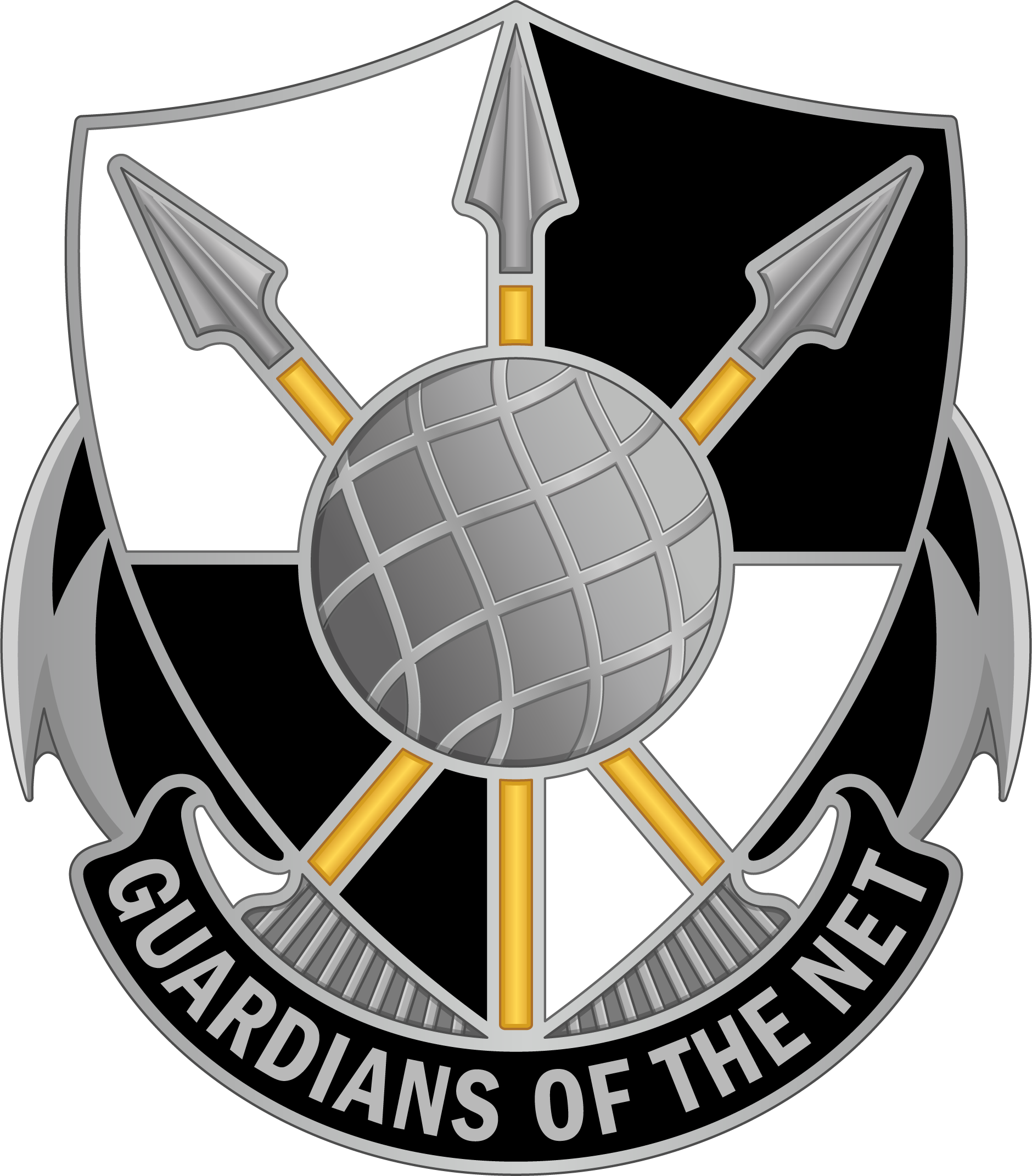
- US Army Reserve Cyber Protection Brigade DUI

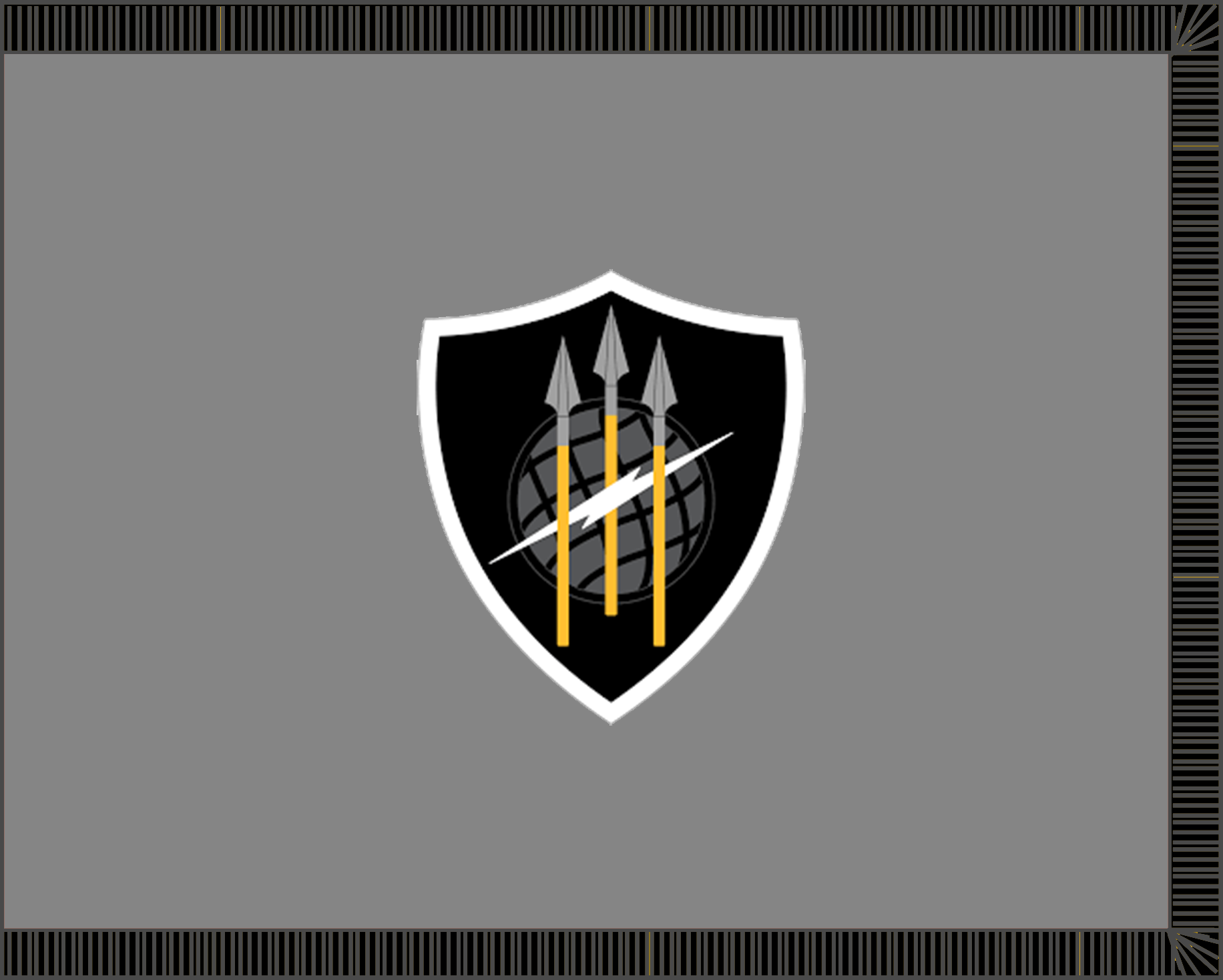
- US Army Reserve Cyber Protection Brigade Flag

The Army Reserve Cyber Protection Brigade (USAR-CPB) was originally activated August 18, 2017 by the United States Army Cyber Command to establish and train Ready Cyber Protection Teams (CPTs) in Adelphi, Maryland. USAR-CPB also helps run cyber defense readiness exercises as well as five Cyber Protection Centers and ten Cyber Protection Teams.

== Subordinate Units ==
- US Army Reserve Cyber Protection Brigade
  - NorthEast Cyber Protection Center (NECPC) - Devens, Massachusetts
    - Cyber Protection Team 180
    - Cyber Protection Team 181
  - National Capital Region Cyber Protection Center (NCRCPC) - Adelphi, Maryland
    - Cyber Protection Team 182
    - Cyber Protection Team 183
  - South West Cyber Protection Center (SWCPC) - Joint Base San Antonio, Texas
    - Cyber Protection Team 184
    - Cyber Protection Team 185
  - North Central Cyber Protection Center (NCCPC) - Coraopolis, Pennsylvania
    - Cyber Protection Team 186
    - Cyber Protection Team 187
  - 304th Cyber Battalion - Camp Parks, California
    - Cyber Protection Team 188
    - Cyber Protection Team 189
