= United States Army Cyber Command =

Information dominance and cyberspace command of the U.S. Army

U.S. Army Cyber Command
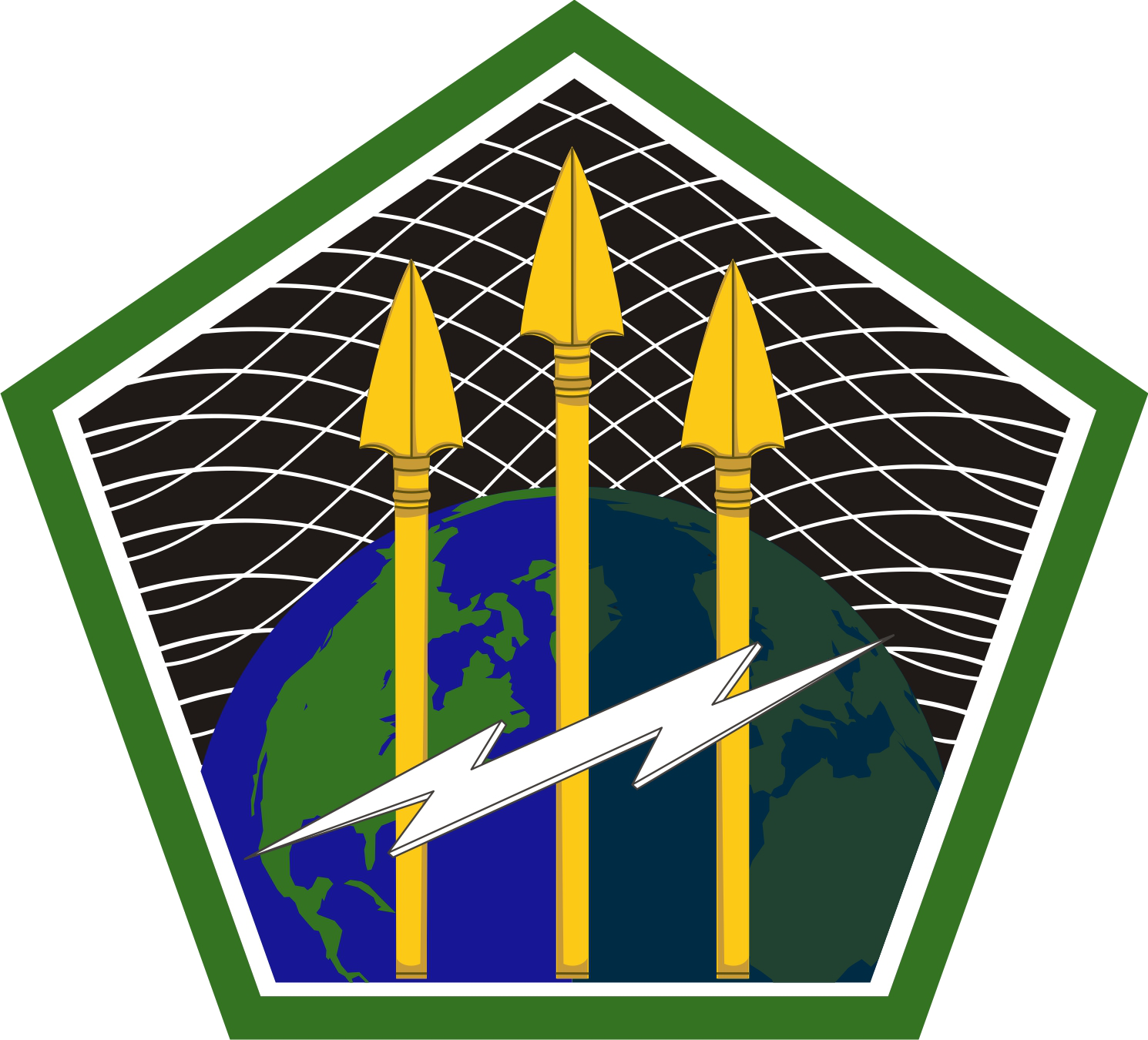
- ARCYBER shoulder sleeve insignia
- Active: 1 October 2010 – present (15 years, 11 months)
- Country: United States
- Allegiance: United States Department of the Army
- Branch: United States Army
- Type: Army Service Component Command
- Role: Cyber operations
- Part of: U.S. Cyber Command
- Garrison/HQ: Fort Gordon, Georgia
- Website: arcyber.army.mil

Commanders
- Commanding General: LTG Christopher L. Eubank
- Deputy Commanding General (Operations): COL John P. Kunstbeck
- Command Sergeant Major: CSM Jebin R. Heyse

Insignia
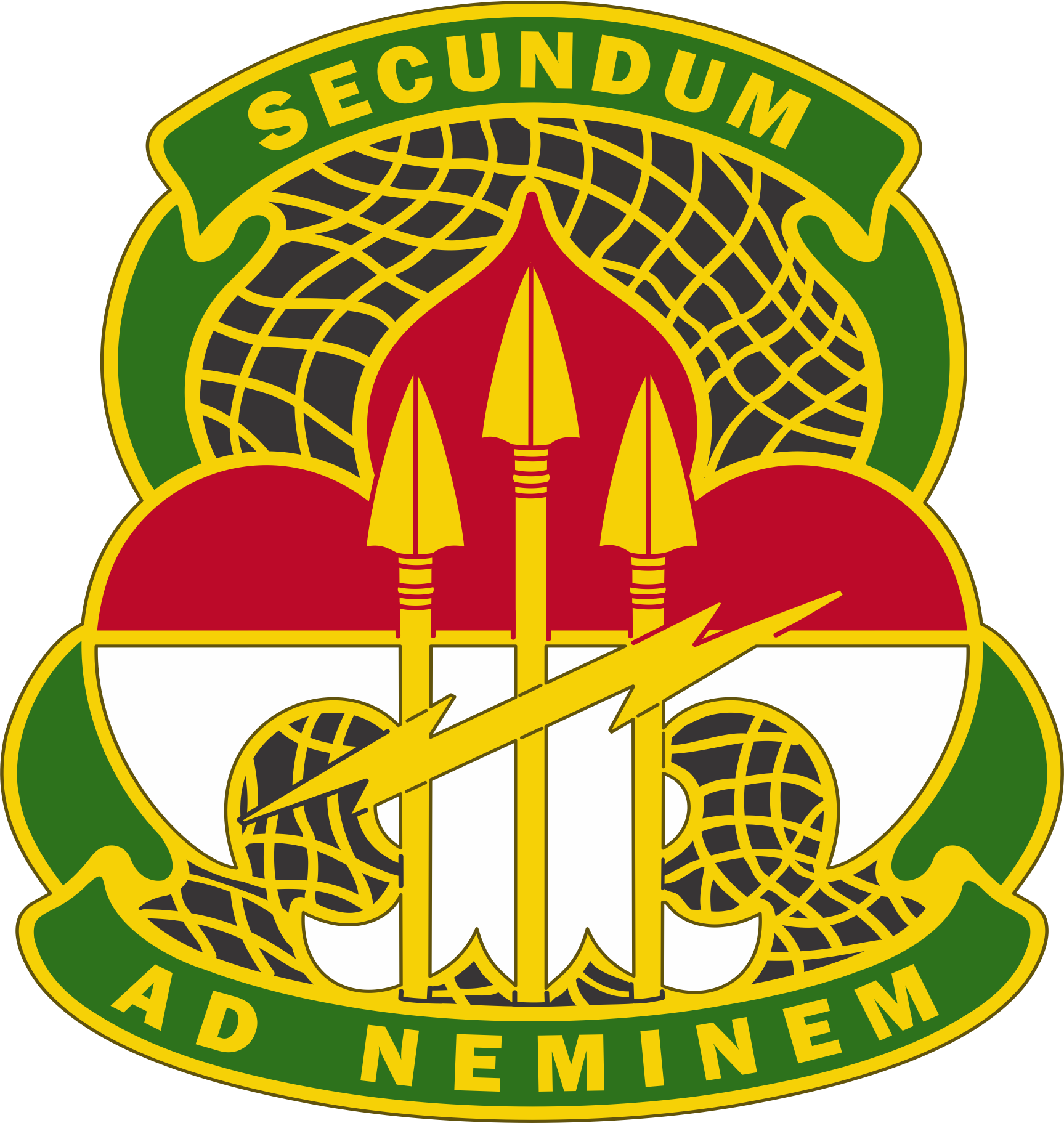
- Distinctive unit insignia

- Seal of Joint Force Headquarters - Cyber (Army) (JFHQ-C (Army))

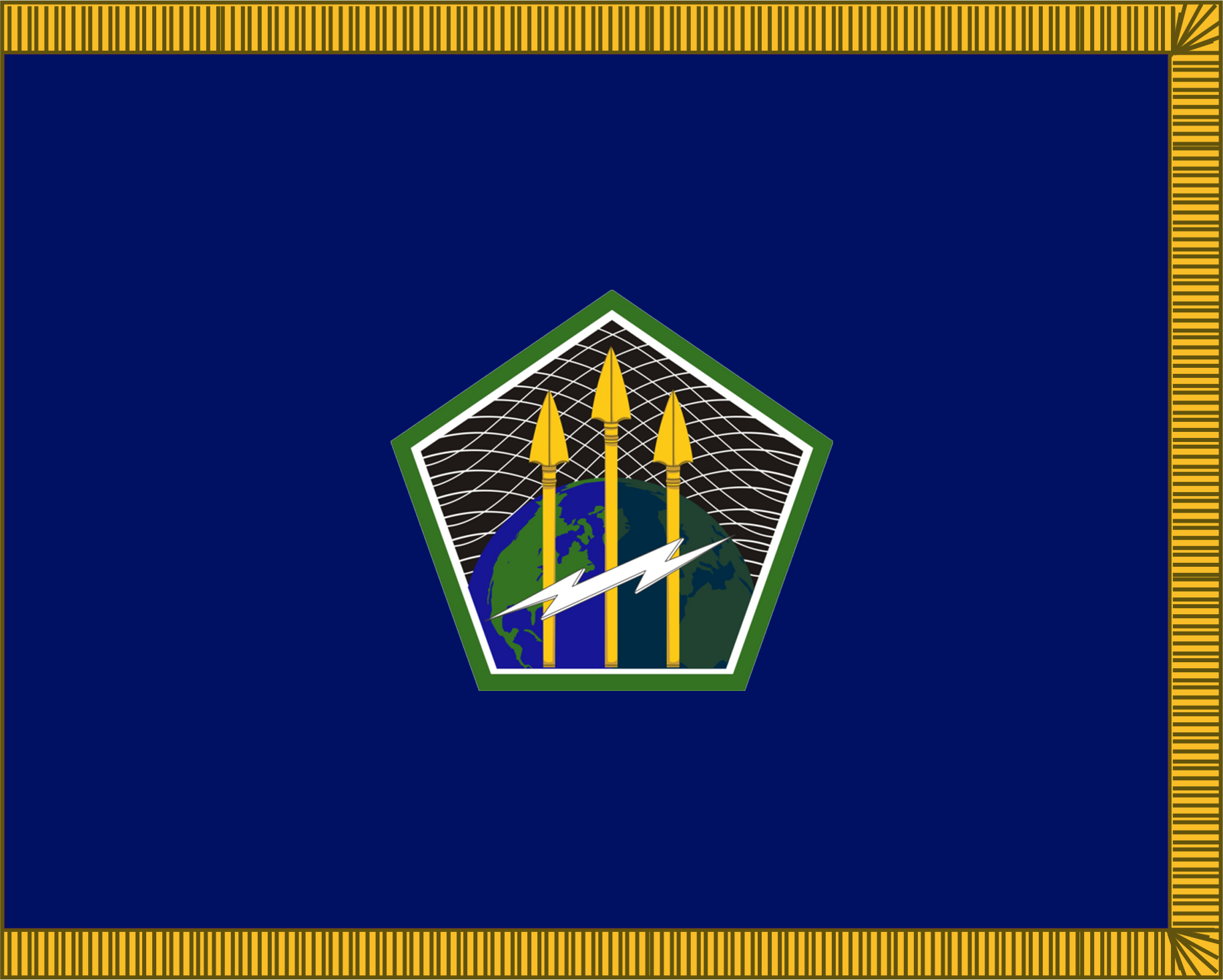
- US Army Cyber Command Flag

The U.S. Army Cyber Command (ARCYBER) conducts information dominance and cyberspace operations as the Army service component command of United States Cyber Command (USCYBERCOM).

ARCYBER was established on 1 October 2010, intending to be the Army's single point of contact for external organizations regarding information operations and cyberspace.

== Organization ==
ARCYBER is the Army service component command supporting USCYBERCOM.

All 41 of the Active Army's cyber mission force teams reached Full Operational Capability (FOC) by September 2017. The cyber mission force teams are composed of a defensive component, denoted cyber protection teams (CPTs), and an offensive component. In addition, 21 CPTs are being readied in the Reserve component. Initial operational capability (IOC) for some of the cyber protection teams was attained as early as 2014 during DoD missions.

=== Subordinate Units ===
- Army Network Enterprise Technology Command
  - US Army Reserve Cyber Protection Brigade
- U.S. Army Intelligence and Security Command will be under the operational control of ARCYBER for cyber-related actions.
  - 780th Military Intelligence Brigade, Fort Meade
- Army Cyber Protection Brigade, Fort Gordon
  - 60th Offensive Cyberspace Operations Signal Battalion (OCOSB)
- 91st Cyber Brigade
- Joint Force Headquarters-Cyber (JFHQ-C) (Army)
- 780th Military Intelligence Brigade (Cyber)
- 11th Cyber Battalion

== History ==
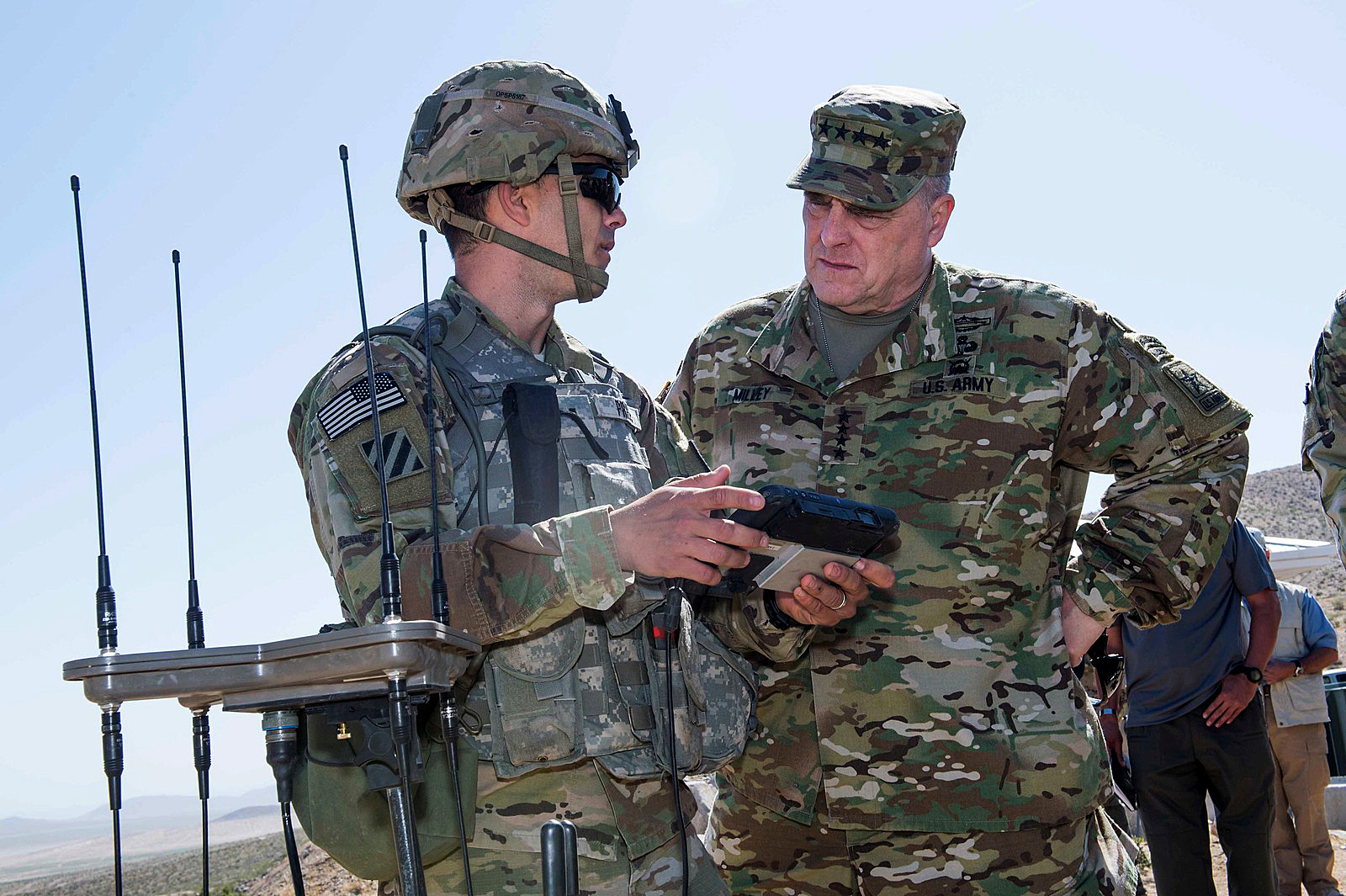
Chairman of the Joint Chiefs of Staff General Mark Milley receives a briefing from a cyber soldier at the Fort Irwin National Training Center.

The Army achieved an initial cyber operating capability in October 2009 by employing the Army Space and Missile Defense Command/Army Forces Strategic Command (SMDC/ARSTRAT) supported by NETCOM/9thSC(A), 1st IO CMD (L), and INSCOM. The command was originally announced to be named Army Forces Cyber Command (ARFORCYBER). The command was established on 1 October 2010 with the name Army Cyber Command (ARCYBER), commanded by then-Maj. Gen. Rhett A. Hernandez. There are plans for the command to move to Fort Gordon, in Augusta, Georgia home of the United States Army Cyber Center of Excellence, the U.S. Army Cyber Corps and Signal Corps.

== Commanding Generals ==
| No. | Commanding General | | Term | | |
| No. | Portrait | Name | Took office | Left office | Term length |
|---|---|---|---|---|---|
| 1 | Rhett A. Hernandez | Lieutenant General; Rhett A. Hernandez (born 1953) | 1 October 2010 | 3 September 2013 | 2 years, 337 days |
| 2 | Edward C. Cardon | Lieutenant General; Edward C. Cardon (born 1960) | 3 September 2013 | 14 October 2016 | 3 years, 41 days |
| 3 | Paul M. Nakasone | Lieutenant General; Paul M. Nakasone (born 1963) | 14 October 2016 | 11 May 2018 | 1 year, 209 days |
| 4 | Stephen G. Fogarty | Lieutenant General; Stephen G. Fogarty | 11 May 2018 | 3 May 2022 | 3 years, 357 days |
| 5 | Maria B. Barrett | Lieutenant General; Maria B. Barrett | 3 May 2022 | 3 December 2025 | 3 years, 214 days |
| 6 | Christopher L. Eubank | Lieutenant General; Christopher L. Eubank | 3 December 2025 | Incumbent | 287 days |

== See also ==
- List of cyber warfare forces
- PLA Unit 61398
- United States Cyber Command
