= Edward C. Cardon =

United States Army general

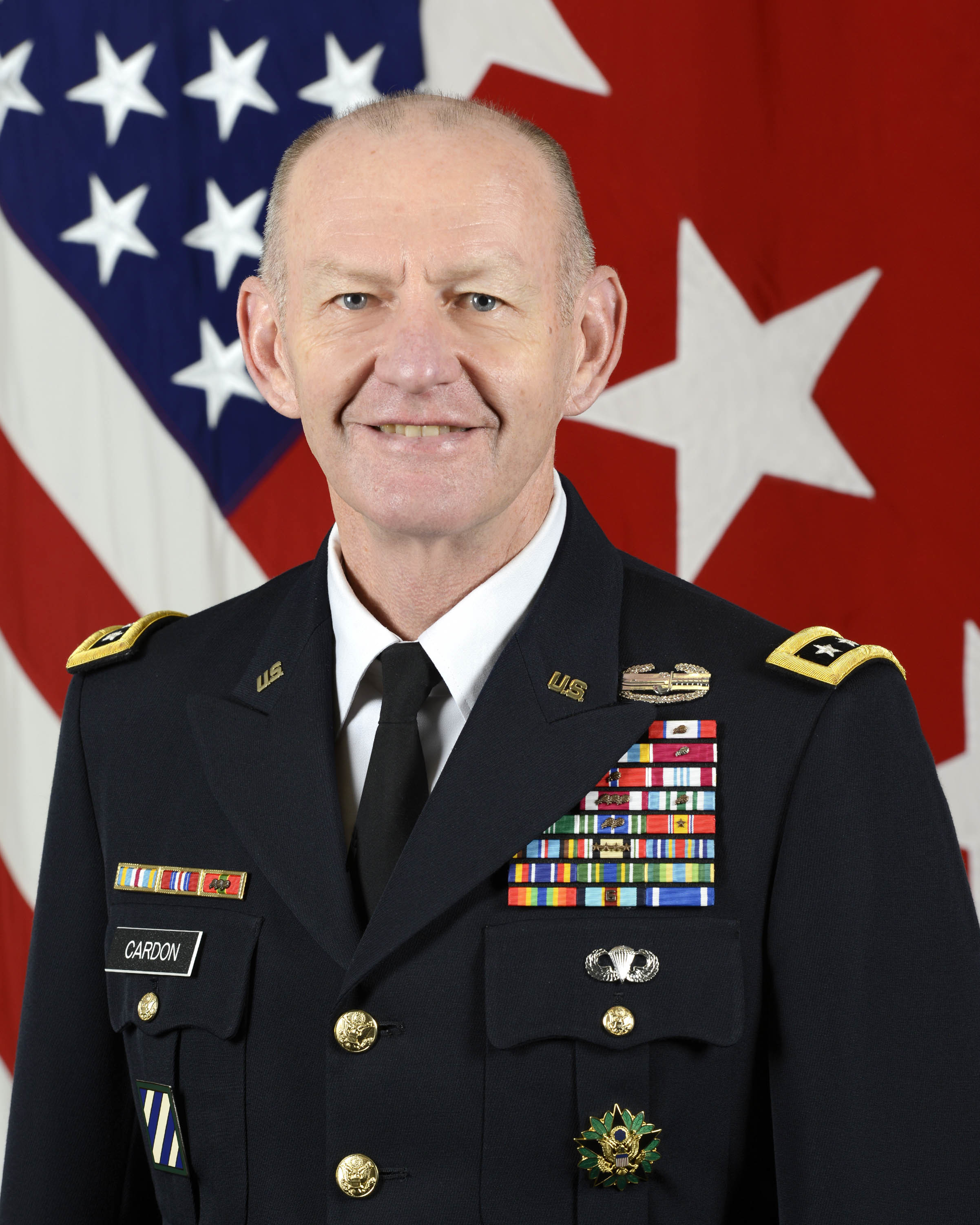
- Born: November 16, 1960 (age 65); El Paso County, Texas, U.S.
- Military career
- Allegiance: United States
- Branch: United States Army
- Service years: 1982–2018
- Rank: Lieutenant General
- Commands: Office of Business Transformation; Second United States Army; United States Army Cyber Command; 2nd Infantry Division
- Conflicts: Iraq War
- Awards: Army Distinguished Service Medal (2); Defense Superior Service Medal; Legion of Merit (6); Bronze Star Medal (2)

Lieutenant General Edward Charles Cardon (born November 16, 1960) is a retired senior officer in the United States Army who last served as the director of the United States Army Office of Business Transformation and before that as former commander of the Second United States Army/United States Army Cyber Command.

== Military career ==
Cardon received his commission upon his graduation from the United States Military Academy in 1982. Upon his entry into service he was commissioned as an engineer officer. During his tenure Cardon has held commands at every organizational level of the Army, ranging from platoon, division, field army, and component command. Cardon has also served as commander of the Engineer Brigade, 3rd Infantry Division, the first commanding officer of the newly reorganized 4th Brigade Combat Team, 3rd Infantry Division, the Deputy Commandant, US Army Command and General Staff College, and the commanding officer of 2nd Infantry Division. Cardon took command of United States Army Cyber Command on September 2, 2013, taking over for retiring Lieutenant General Rhett A. Hernandez. Cardon was given command of the Second Army upon its reactivation on March 6, 2014, when the positions of commander of US Army Cyber Command and commander of the Second Army were dual hatted. While head of US Army Cyber Command, Cardon was tasked with setting up cyber protection teams to protect Army systems and network from intrusions as well as moving the Army to a "more defensible platform".

Cardon served as commander of US Army Cyber Command and the 2nd Army until October 14, 2016, when he was succeeded as commanding officer by Lieutenant General Paul M. Nakasone upon his was appointment as chief of the United States Army Office of Business Transformation. In addition to receiving his bachelor's degree from the United States Military Academy at West Point, Cardon has also attended the National War College where he received a MS in National Security and Strategic Studies and the United States Naval Command and Staff College where he received a second Master of Science in National Security Strategic Studies.

As DIROBT, Cardon was tasked by the army's top officer to review the problem and devise ways to strengthen the senior officer corps.

== Awards and decorations ==
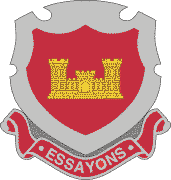
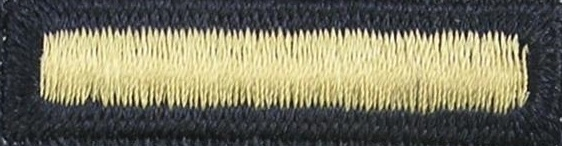
Combat Action Badge
Basic Parachutist Badge
Army Staff Identification Badge
3rd Infantry Division Combat Service Identification Badge
United States Army Corps of Engineers Distinctive Unit Insignia
6 Overseas Service Bars

Army Distinguished Service Medal with one bronze oak leaf cluster
Defense Superior Service Medal
Legion of Merit with silver oak leaf cluster
Bronze Star Medal with oak leaf cluster
Defense Meritorious Service Medal
Meritorious Service Medal with three oak leaf clusters
Joint Service Commendation Medal with oak leaf cluster
Army Commendation Medal
Army Achievement Medal with two oak leaf clusters
Joint Meritorious Unit Award
Valorous Unit Award
Superior Unit Award with three oak leaf clusters
National Defense Service Medal with one bronze service star
Armed Forces Expeditionary Medal
Iraq Campaign Medal with four campaign stars
Global War on Terrorism Expeditionary Medal
Global War on Terrorism Service Medal
Korea Defense Service Medal
Armed Forces Service Medal
Army Service Ribbon
Army Overseas Service Ribbon with bronze award numeral 6
NATO Medal for the former Yugoslavia

== Personal ==
Cardon is the son of Lawrence Edward Cardon and Cornelia Helen (Overdevest) Cardon. He is married and has three children.

Military offices
Preceded by Rhett A. Hernandez	Commanding General of the United States Army Cyber Command; 2013–2016	Succeeded by Paul M. Nakasone
Preceded by Guy A. J. LaBoa	Commanding General of the Second United States Army; 2014–2016	Succeeded by Paul M. Nakasone
