= Rhett A. Hernandez =

United States Army general

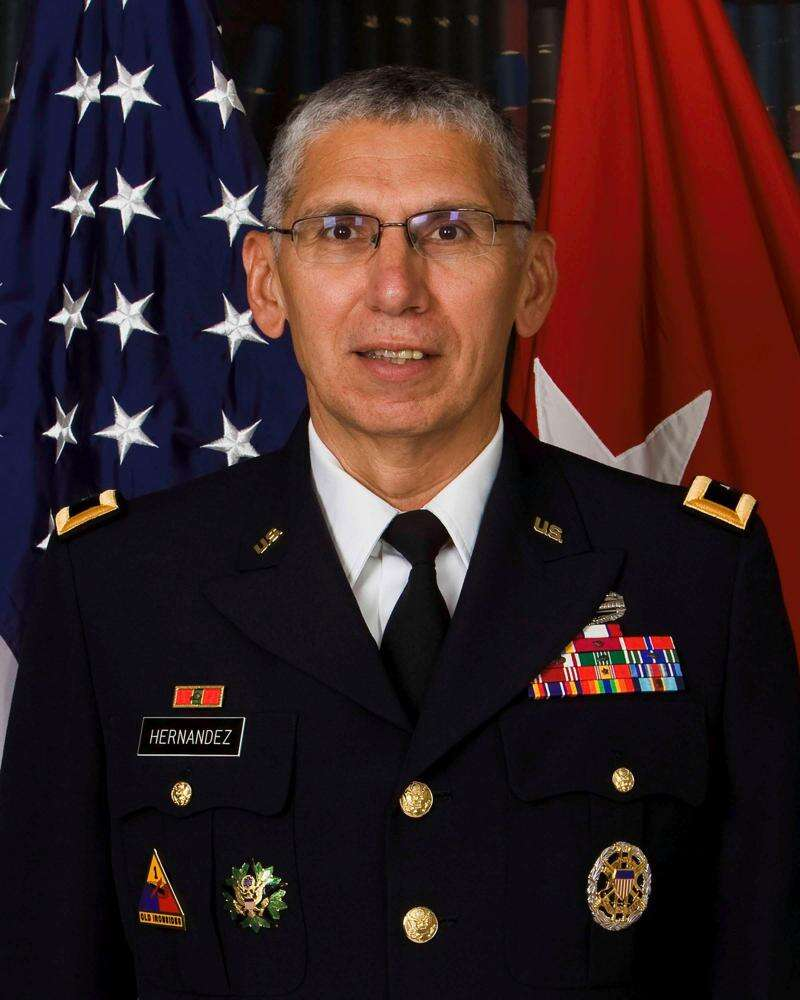
- Born: March 9, 1953 (age 73); Palmerton, Pennsylvania, U.S.
- Military career
- Allegiance: United States
- Branch: United States Army
- Service years: 1976–2013
- Rank: Lieutenant General
- Commands: United States Army Cyber Command; United States Army Human Resources Command; United States Military Training Mission in Saudi Arabia; 4th Infantry Division Artillery
- Awards: Army Distinguished Service Medal (2); Defense Superior Service Medal (2); Legion of Merit (2); Bronze Star Medal

Lieutenant General Rhett Anthony Hernandez (born March 9, 1953) is a retired officer in the United States Army and the former commander of the United States Army Cyber Command, the Army's service component to United States Cyber Command. Hernandez assumed the position upon its activation at Fort Belvoir in Virginia, on October 10, 2010.

== Early life and education ==
Hernandez was born in Palmerton, Pennsylvania, on March 9, 1953. Hernandez attended the University of Virginia, where he received a master's degree in systems engineering, and the National War College, where he received a master's degree in national security and strategic studies.

== Military career ==
In 1976, Hernandez was commissioned into the United States Army as a Field Artillery officer upon graduation from the United States Military Academy. He held posts with several field artillery units and as a staff officer, including as Assistant G-3/5/7, Headquarters, Department of the Army, Chief, United States Military Training Mission in Saudi Arabia, and commander, United States Army Human Resources Command.

Hernandez commanded the United States Army Cyber Command from its creation on October 1, 2010, until he handed command over to Lieutenant General Edward C. Cardon on September 3, 2013. He received a promotion to lieutenant general on March 25, 2011.

As head of Army Cyber Command, Hernandez was responsible for planning, coordinating, and integrating the network operations and defense of all United States Army networks. Hernandez was also tasked with conducting cyberspace operations in support of army operations through his command of approximately 21,000 soldiers and civilians. Hernandez oversaw a command that brought an unprecedented unity of effort and synchronization of all Army forces operating within the cyber domain. Under Hernandez, the command concentrated its efforts on operationalizing cyberspace and improving Army capabilities in the cyberspace domain. The command established the Army Cyber Operations and Integration Center collocating intelligence, operations, and signal staffs, together with a critical targeting function, and bringing a new synergy to Army cyberspace operations. Hernandez developed new doctrinal concepts for land-cyber operations; and identified the Army's capability requirements needed to fully operationalize the cyberspace domain and grow the Army's cyber force. He currently serves on the Board of Advisors of the Military Cyber Professionals Association (MCPA).

Hernandez retired on September 4, 2013.

== Awards ==
Hernandez received the Army Distinguished Service Medal (2), Defense Superior Service Medal (2), the Legion of Merit (2), the Bronze Star Medal, the Meritorious Service Medal (5), the Army Commendation Medal (5), the Army Achievement Medal (2), the Combat Action Badge, the Joint Chiefs of Staff Identification Badge, and the Army Staff Identification Badge.
