= 780th Military Intelligence Brigade (United States) =

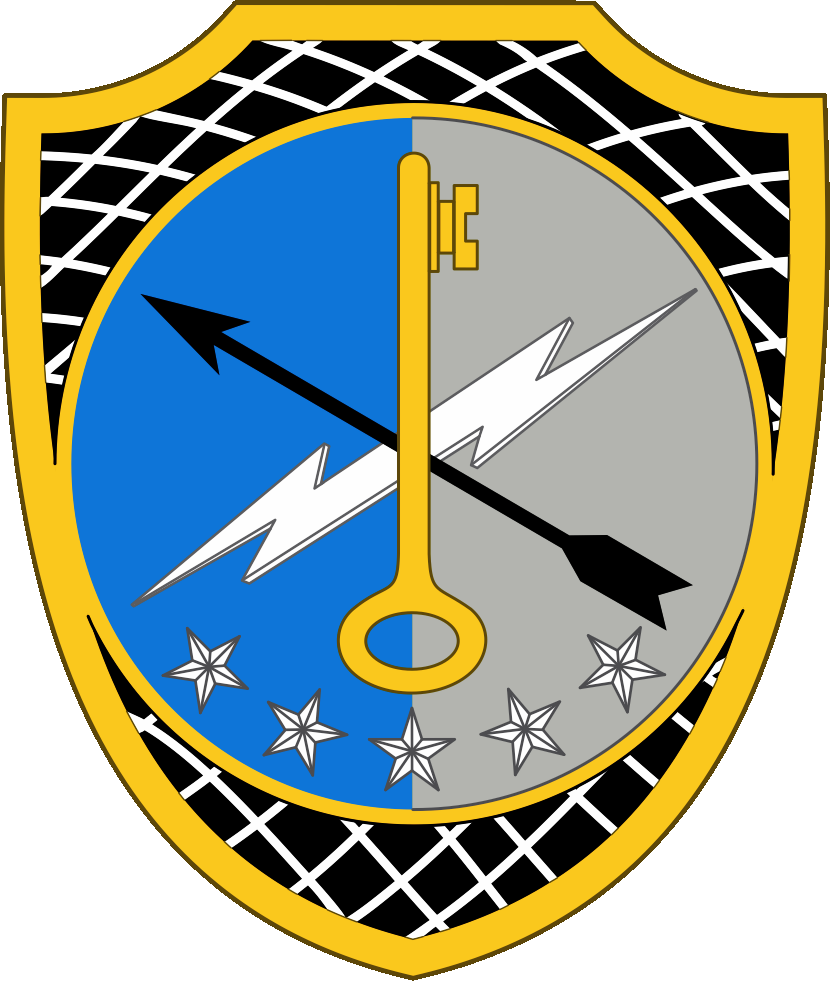
- Active: 2011 - present
- Country: United States
- Branch: United States Army
- Type: Military intelligence Cyberwarfare
- Role: Cyber Operations
- Size: Brigade
- Part of: United States Army Cyber Command
- Headquarters: Fort Meade, Maryland
- Nickname: Praetorians
- Website: 780th MI BDE website

Commanders
- Current Commander: Colonel Benjamin H. Klimkowski
- Command Sergeant Major: Command Sergeant Major Joseph Daniel

Insignia
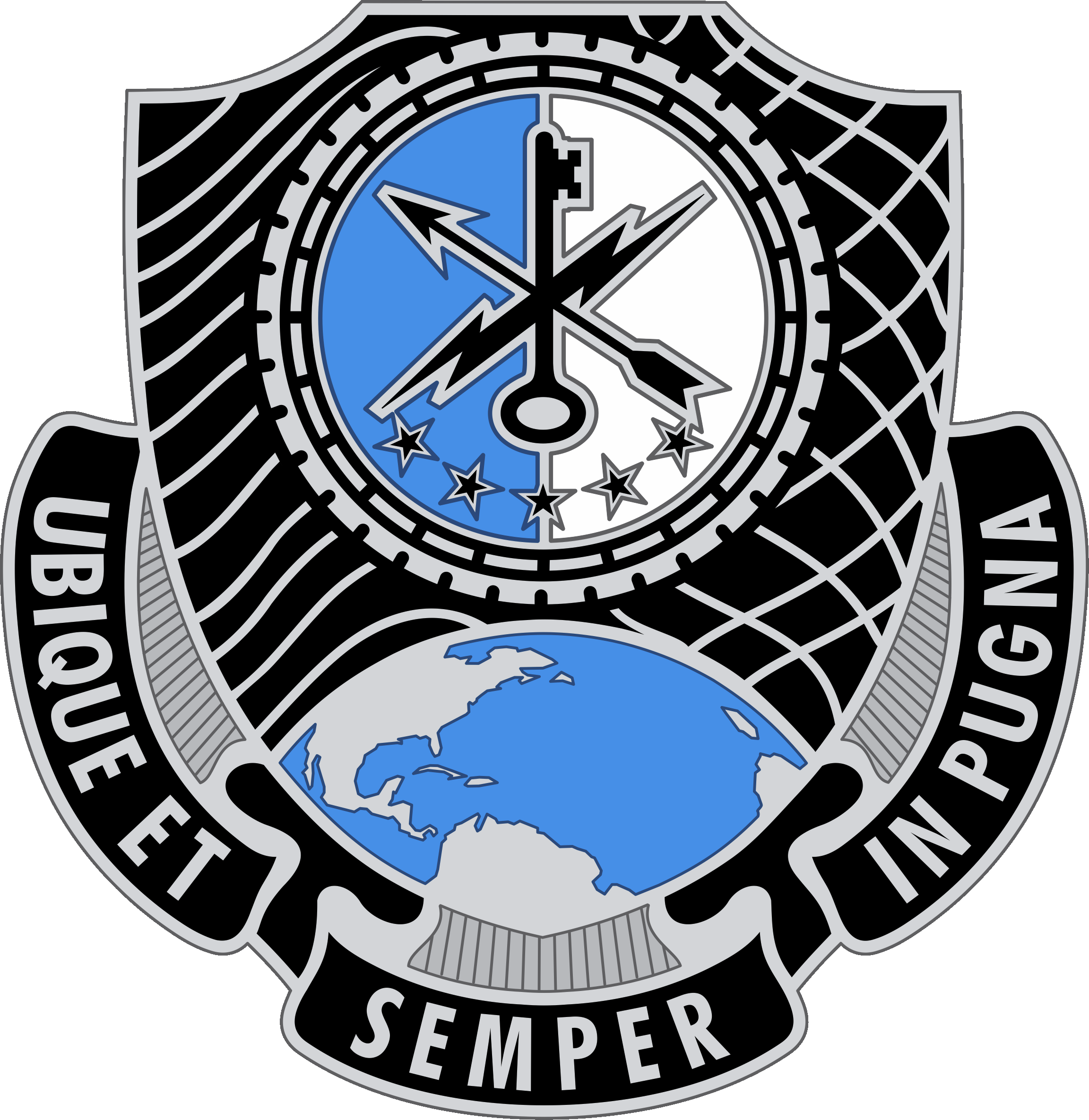
- Distinctive Unit Insignia

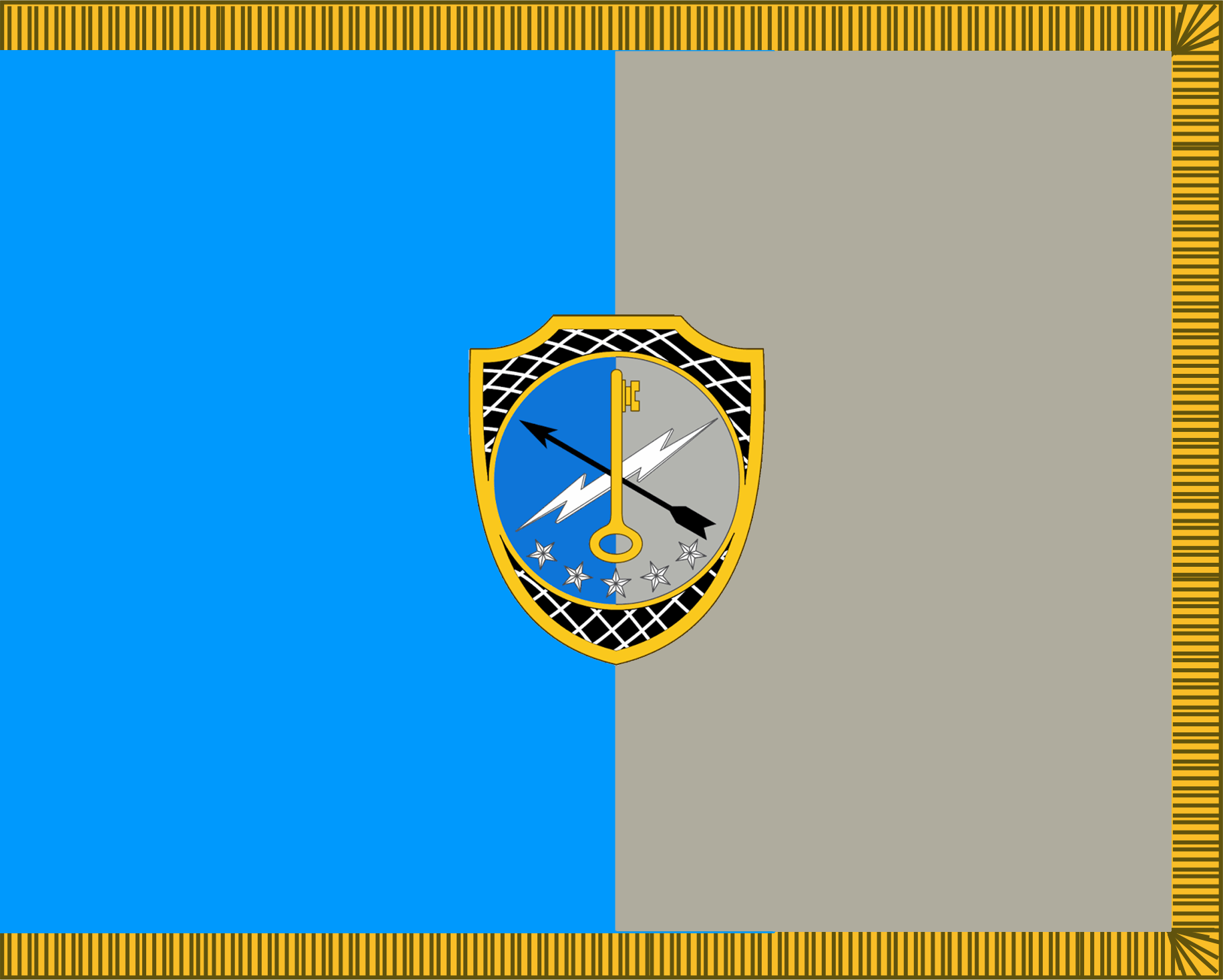
- 780th Military Intelligence Brigade Flag

The 780th Military Intelligence Brigade conducts cyberspace operations to deliver effects in support of Army and Joint requirements. The 780th MI BDE is the only offensive cyberspace operations brigade in the U.S. Army.

The 11th Cyber Battalion (11th CYB) activated on October 16, 2022.

== See also ==
- Military Intelligence Corps (United States Army)
- United States Army Intelligence and Security Command
- United States Army Cyber Command
- Battlefield surveillance brigades in the United States Army – the United States Army is currently reorganizing its intelligence formations into Battlefield Surveillance Brigades (BfSB).
