= 91st Cyber Brigade =

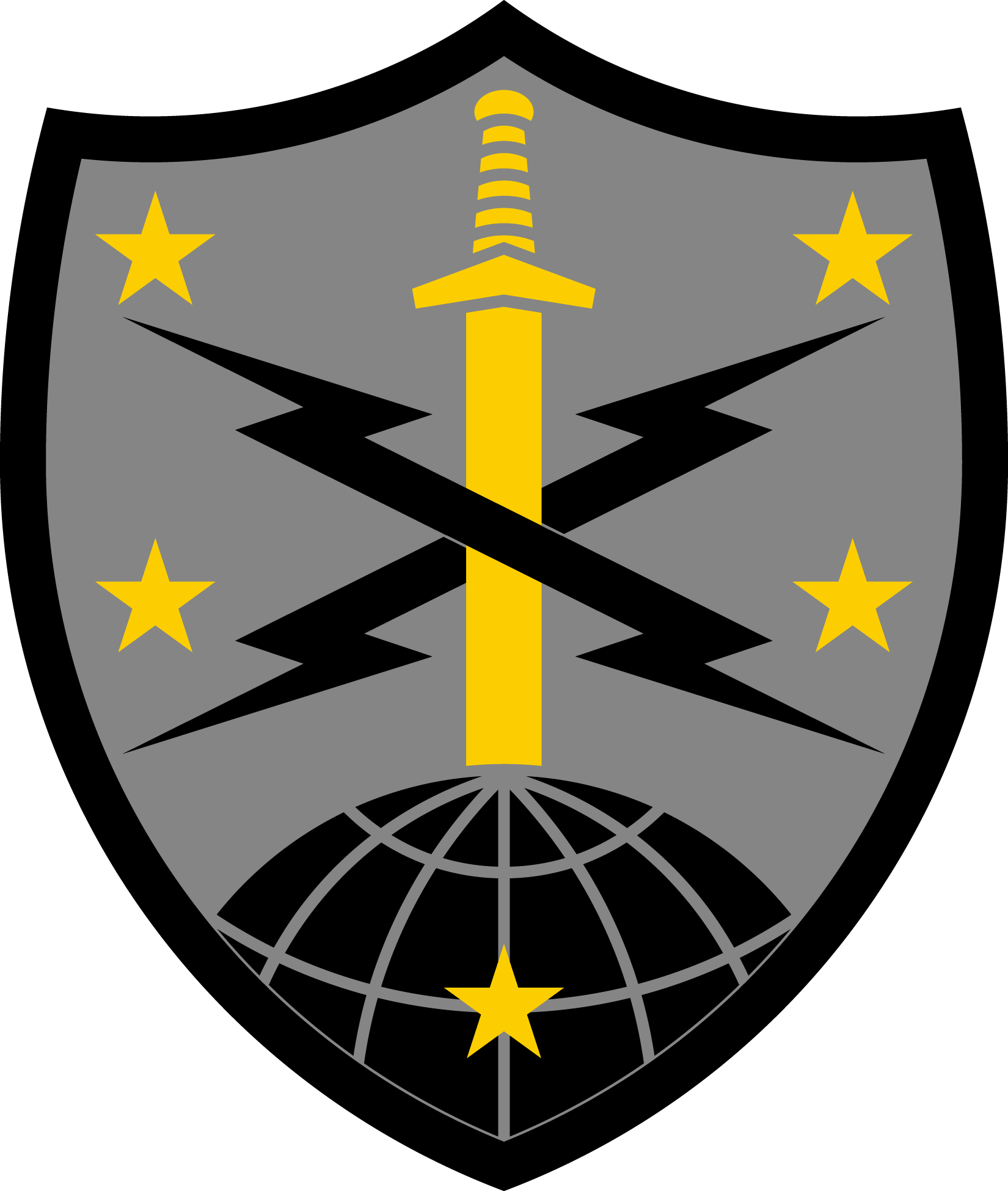
- Active: 2017 - present
- Country: United States
- Allegiance: Virginia Army National Guard
- Branch: United States Army National Guard
- Type: Cyber
- Size: Brigade
- Part of: United States Army Cyber Command
- Garrison/HQ: Fort Belvoir, Virginia
- Motto: UMBRA BELLATORES (Shadow Warriors)

Commanders
- Current commander: Col. Gerald Mazur

Insignia
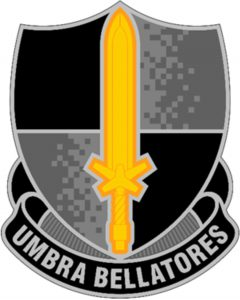
- 91st Cyber Brigade DUI

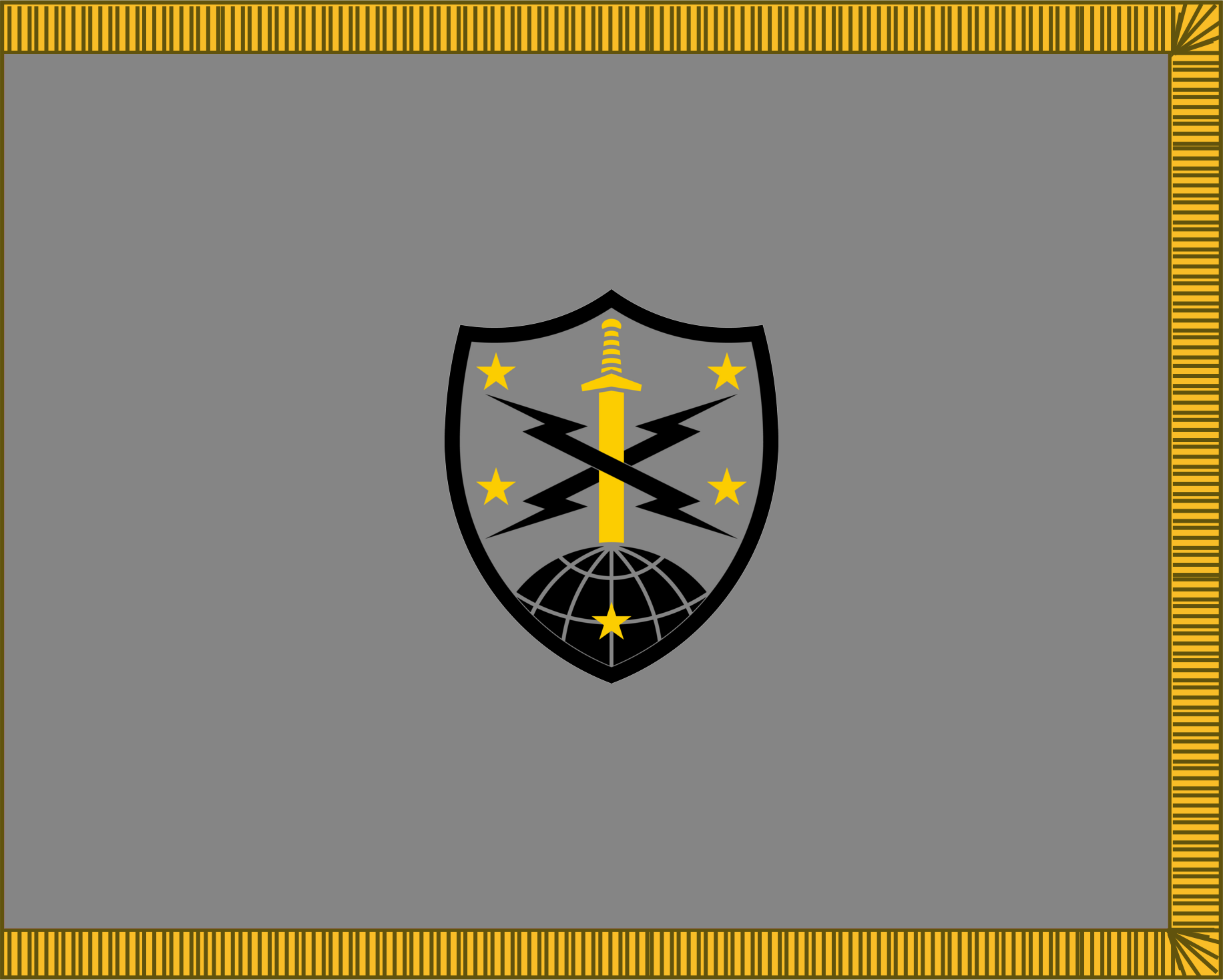
- 91st Cyber Brigade Flag

The 91st Cyber Brigade the "Shadow Brigade" is a unit of the Army National Guard since September 2017 stationed at Fort Belvoir, Va. The Brigade's mission is to provide training and readiness in cyber security and operational control in the cyber realm. In March 2025, the brigade direct commissioned Robert M. Lee (CEO and co-founder of Dragos) at the rank of Lieutenant Colonel in the billet of executive officer of the Information Operations Support Center at Fort Belvoir similar to the Detachment 201 commissioning ceremony in June, 2025.

== Organization ==
- 91st Cyber Brigade, in Bowling Green (VA) — (Virginia Army National Guard)
  - Headquarters and Headquarters Company, 91st Cyber Brigade, in Bowling Green (VA)
  - Information Operations Support Center, in Fairfax (VA)
  - 123rd Cyber Protection Battalion, in Fairfax (VA) — (Virginia Army National Guard)
    - Headquarters and Headquarters Company, 123rd Cyber Protection Battalion, in Fairfax (VA)
    - 133rd Cyber Security Company, in Fairfax (VA)
    - 143rd Cyber Warfare Company, in Fairfax (VA)
  - 124th Cyber Protection Battalion, in Fairfax (VA) — (Virginia Army National Guard)
    - Headquarters and Headquarters Company, 124th Cyber Protection Battalion, in Fairfax (VA)
    - 134th Cyber Security Company, in Fairfax (VA)
    - 144th Cyber Warfare Company, in Fairfax (VA)
  - 125th Cyber Protection Battalion, at McEntire Joint National Guard Base (SC) — (South Carolina Army National Guard)
    - Headquarters and Headquarters Company, 125th Cyber Protection Battalion, at McEntire Joint National Guard Base (SC)
    - 135th Cyber Security Company, at McEntire Joint National Guard Base (SC)
    - 145th Cyber Warfare Company, at McEntire Joint National Guard Base (SC)
  - 126th Cyber Protection Battalion, in Bedford (MA) — (Massachusetts Army National Guard)
    - Headquarters and Headquarters Company, 126th Cyber Protection Battalion, in Bedford (MA)
    - 136th Cyber Security Company, in Bedford (MA)
      - Detachment 1, 136th Cyber Security Company, in Pembroke (NH) — (New Hampshire Army National Guard)
      - Detachment 2, 136th Cyber Security Company, in Northfield (VT) — (Vermont Army National Guard)
    - 146th Cyber Warfare Company, in Bedford (MA)
  - 127th Cyber Protection Battalion, at Stout Field (IN) — (Indiana Army National Guard)
    - Headquarters and Headquarters Company, 127th Cyber Protection Battalion, at Stout Field (IN)
    - 137th Cyber Security Company, at Stout Field (IN)
    - 147th Cyber Warfare Company, at Stout Field (IN)
  - Cyber Protection Team 169 — (Maryland Army National Guard)
  - Cyber Protection Team 170 — (Georgia Army National Guard)
  - Cyber Protection Team 171, at Camp San Luis Obispo (CA) — (California Army National Guard)
  - Cyber Protection Team 172, in Columbus (OH) — (Ohio Army National Guard)
    - Detachment 1, Cyber Protection Team 172, in Lansing (MI) — (Michigan Army National Guard)
  - Cyber Protection Team 173, at Camp Smith (NY) — (New York Army National Guard)
  - Cyber Protection Team 174, in Centennial (CO) — (Colorado Army National Guard)
    - Detachment 3, Cyber Protection Team 174, in Draper (UT) — (Utah Army National Guard)
  - Cyber Protection Team 176, in Bloomington (IL) — (Illinois Army National Guard)
    - Detachment 1, Cyber Protection Team 176 — (Wisconsin Army National Guard)
  - Cyber Protection Team 175 — (Alabama Army National Guard, Kentucky Army National Guard and Tennessee Army National Guard)
  - Cyber Protection Team 177, in Rosemount (MN) — (Minnesota Army National Guard)
  - Cyber Protection Team 178, in Starkville (MS) — (Mississippi Army National Guard)
  - Cyber Protection Team 179, in Omaha (NE) — (Nebraska Army National Guard)
    - Detachment 1, Cyber Protection Team 179, at Jefferson Barracks (MO) — (Missouri Army National Guard)
