= Navy Space Command =

Naval service component of the U.S. Space Command

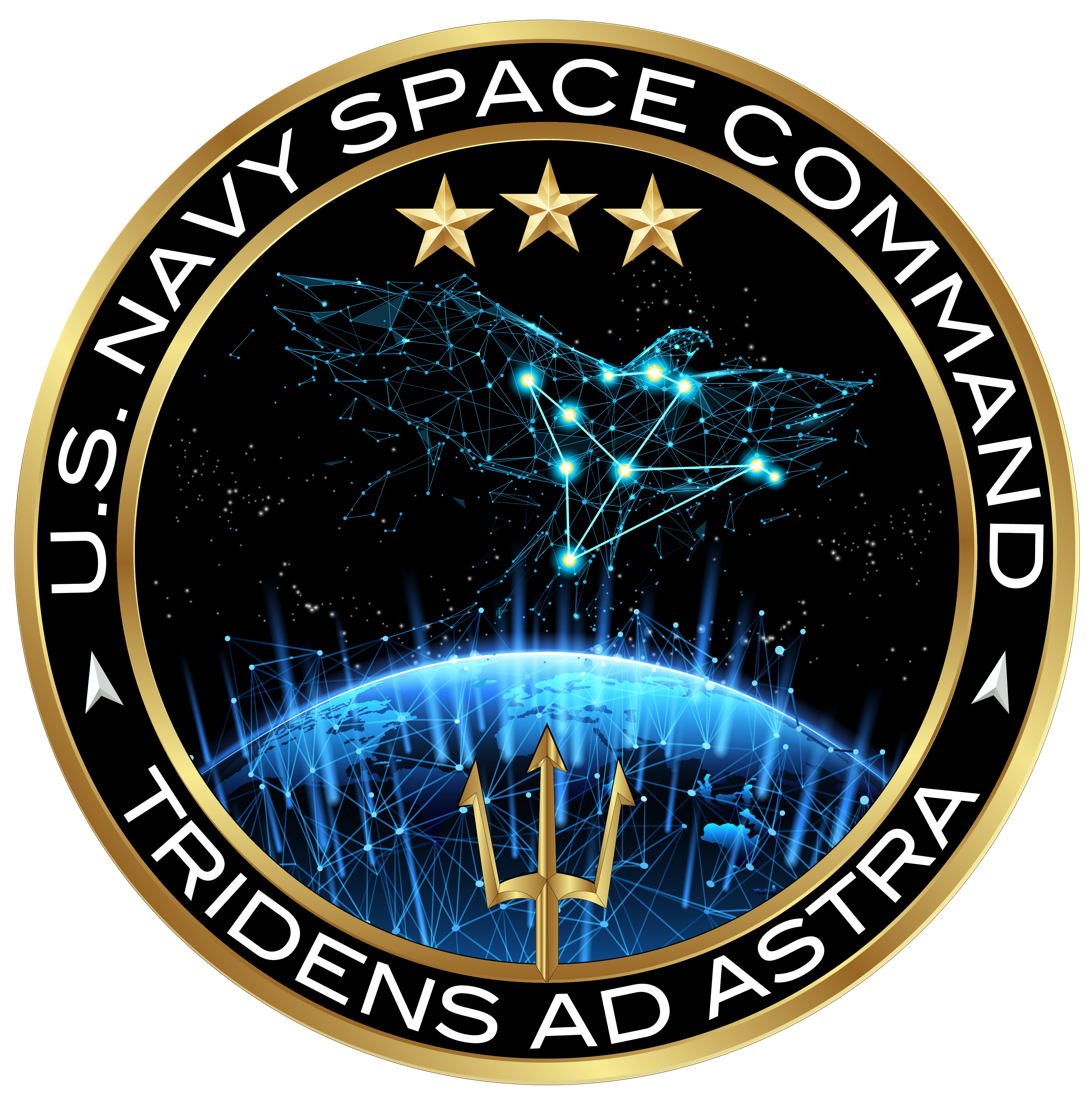
- Active: April 2019 – present
- Country: United States
- Branch: United States Navy
- Part of: U.S. Space Command
- Garrison/HQ: Fort Meade, Maryland
- Motto: Tridens Ad Astra (Latin)

Commanders
- Commander: Vice Admiral Heidi Berg

The Navy Space Command (abbreviated NAVSPACECOM) is a command that is tasked with developing space capability to provide the United States Navy with global communications, targeting, and reconnaissance using space-based assets.

== History ==
The U.S. Navy previously had the Naval Space Command (NSC) that was active from 1985 to 2002 as the Navy component of U.S. Space Command, before that organization was restructured and merged with United States Strategic Command by Defense Secretary Donald Rumsfeld. The functions of the NSC were then divided between several other organizations, with the command initially becoming part of the Naval Network Warfare Command in July 2002 (which became the "Naval Network and Space Operations Command"). In late 2003 the Defense Secretary requested that the Navy transfer all of its space functions to the Air Force, and by the end of 2004 they were given to the Air Force's 20th Space Control Squadron, while the NNSOC reverted to its original name. Prior to its dissolution in 2002, the Naval Space Command headquarters had about 300 personnel.

The Chief of Naval Operations ordered the creation of the Navy Space Command (NAVSPACECOM) on 26 April 2019 to serve as the naval component of the reestablished U.S. Space Command. On 6 March 2022, a letter from the CNO intended for NAVSPACECOM to become a separate command under the leadership of the commander of United States Fleet Cyber Command. The position of Commander, Navy Space Command, was formally established on 1 January 2023, though it was already being used as of 2020 by the head of Fleet Cyber Command. The head of Fleet Cyber Command and its operating component, the U.S. Tenth Fleet, is also the commander of Navy Space Command. The Navy Space Command is tasked with space domain operations to provide the Navy with global communications connectivity and targeting capability from the sea floor to space, through the usage of space assets, together with its other partners in U.S. Space Command.

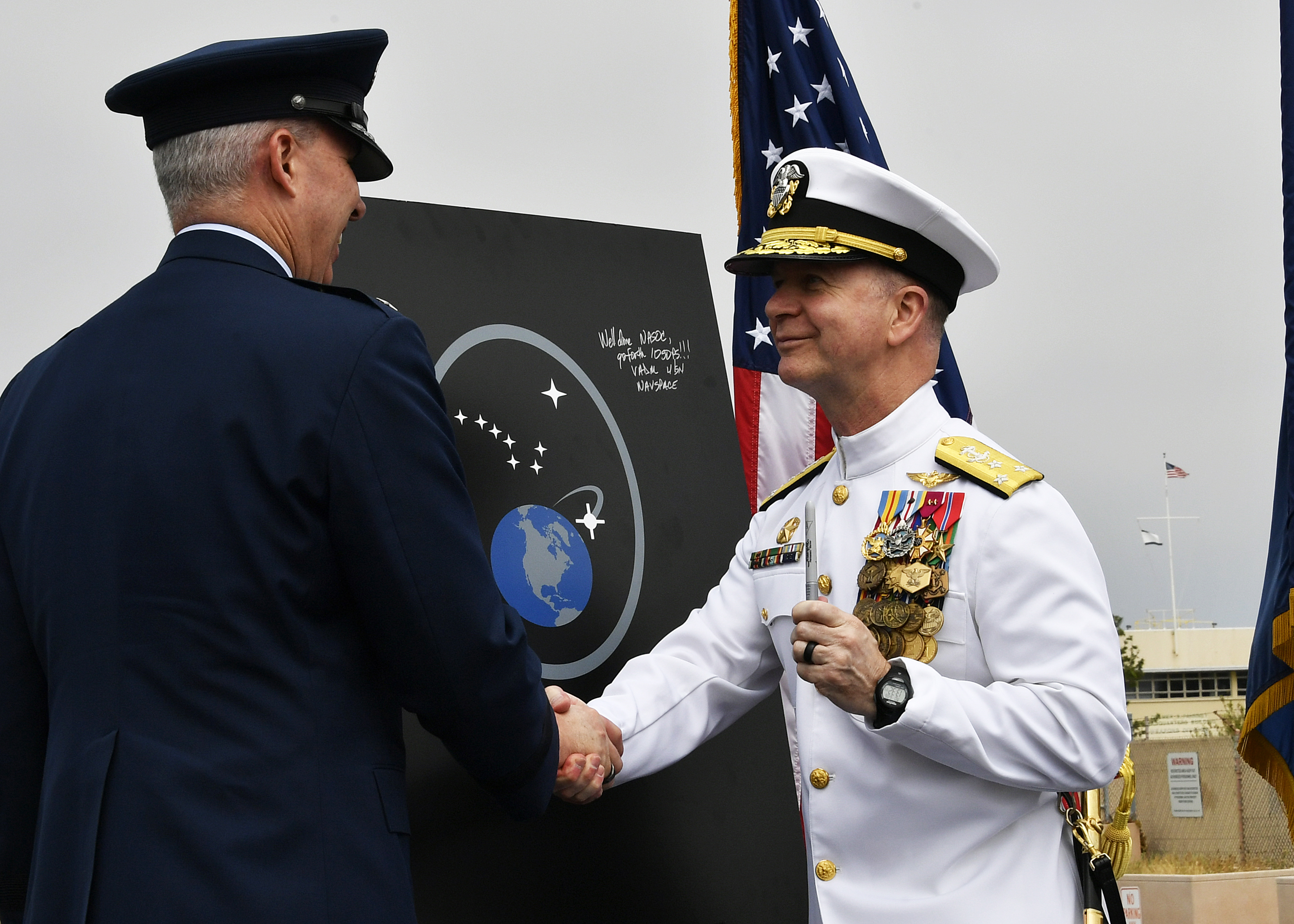
Transfer of the Naval Satellite Operations Center from the Navy to the Space Force.

When the Space Force was established in 2019 it was intended to consolidate the existing military space forces across the Army, Navy, and Air Force. On 21 September 2021, the Navy and Space Force announced that the Naval Satellite Operations Center and its responsibility for narrowband satellite communications would be transferring to the new service. This accelerated implementation of a 2019 pre-Space Force agreement between the Department of the Air Force and the Department of the Navy to transfer responsibility for the Mobile User Objective System follow-on from the Navy to the Air Force and see the Navy end its space operations mission. However, the Space Force agreed to let the Navy maintain a small space research footprint at the Naval Research Laboratory. On 6 June 2022, the Naval Space Operations Center transferred from the Navy to the Space Force, ending 60 years of Naval space operations. Founded as the Navy Astronautics Group in 1962 it was the first military space operations command established and was redesignated the Naval Satellite Operations Center in 1990. The Space Force replaced it with the 10th Space Operations Squadron, named after the United States Tenth Fleet to honor NAVSOC's legacy with it.

== Commanders ==
No.	Commander		Term		
No.	Portrait	Name	Took office	Left office	Term length
1	Timothy J. White	Vice Admiral; Timothy J. White	26 April 2019	18 September 2020	1 year, 145 days
2	Ross A. Myers	Vice Admiral; Ross A. Myers	18 September 2020	4 August 2022	1 year, 320 days
3	Craig Clapperton	Vice Admiral; Craig Clapperton	4 August 2022	10 October 2025	3 years, 67 days
4	Heidi Berg	Vice Admiral; Heidi Berg	10 October 2025	Incumbent	308 days
