= Craig Clapperton =

Retired American admiral (born 1967)

Craig A. Clapperton
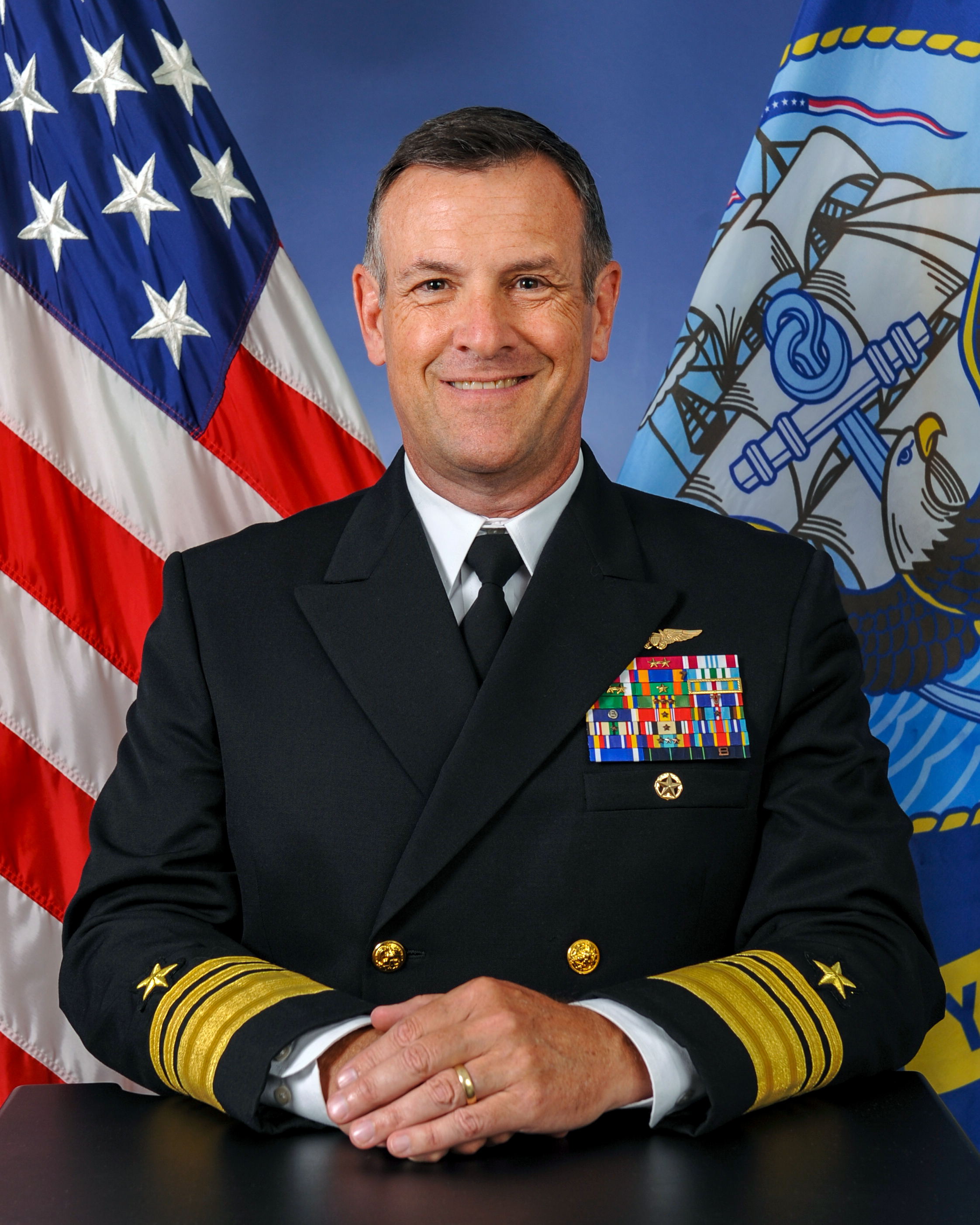
- Clapperton as a vice admiral, 2022
- Born: 1967 (age 58–59)
- Education: Pennsylvania State University (BS); United States Naval War College (MA)
- Military career
- Allegiance: United States
- Branch: United States Navy
- Service years: 1989–2025
- Rank: Vice Admiral
- Nickname: Clap
- Commands: United States Fleet Cyber Command; United States Tenth Fleet; Combined Joint Task Force, Cyber; Carrier Strike Group 12; USS Theodore Roosevelt (CVN-71); USS Mount Whitney (LCC-20); VAQ-141
- Awards: Defense Superior Service Medal; Legion of Merit (3); Air Medal; Admiral James Bond Stockdale Award for Inspirational Leadership

Craig A. "Clap" Clapperton (born 1967) is a retired United States Navy vice admiral and Naval Flight Officer who served as the commander of U.S. Fleet Cyber Command and the United States Tenth Fleet from 4 August 2022 to 10 October 2025.

== Biography ==
Clapperton commissioned into the U.S. Navy in 1989 after graduating with a bachelor's degree from Pennsylvania State University. He most recently served as the commander of Combined Joint Task Force, Cyber from 30 June 2021 to 7 June 2022. He previously served as commander of Carrier Strike Group 12 from 7 May 2020 to 17 June 2021.

He was also deputy director of operations of United States Cyber Command, with command tours as commanding officer of the USS Theodore Roosevelt (CVN-71) from July 2015 to July 2017 and commanding officer of USS Mount Whitney (LCC-20) from November 2012 to July 2014. He also commanded the Shadowhawks of Electronic Attack Squadron 141 (VAQ-141), relinquishing command in September 2007 to Commander Michael D. McKenna.

A native of Pittsburgh, Pennsylvania, Clapperton graduated from Pennsylvania State University with a Bachelor of Science in Aerospace Engineering, commissioning via the NROTC program in 1989 and designated as a Naval Flight Officer upon completion of flight training in 1991. He would then go on to fly the EA-6B Prowler in various squadrons. In 2008, he earned an M.A. degree in National Strategy and Security Studies from the United States Naval War College (with highest distinction) and was a member of the college's elite Stockdale group. He is also a distinguished graduate of the Navy Nuclear Power Training Command and completed nuclear power training in 2010. He was the 2007 recipient of the Admiral James Bond Stockdale Award for Inspirational Leadership.

In March 2023, Clapperton was nominated for reappointment as vice admiral, with the addition of Navy Space Command to his assignment.

Military offices
Preceded by Ted R. Williams	Commanding Officer of USS Mount Whitney (LCC-20); 2012–2014	Succeeded by Mark J. Columbo
Preceded by Daniel Grieco	Commanding Officer of USS Theodore Roosevelt (CVN-71); 2015–2017	Succeeded by Carlos A. Sardiello
Preceded by ???	Deputy Director of Operations of the United States Cyber Command; 2017–2018	Succeeded by Paul T. Stanton
Preceded by Michael E. Boyle	Commander of Carrier Strike Group 12; 2020–2021	Succeeded by Gregory C. Huffman
New office	Commander of Combined Joint Task Force, Cyber, United States Tenth Fleet; 2021–2022	Succeeded by Darryl L. Walker
Preceded by Ross A. Myers	Commander of United States Fleet Cyber Command, Navy Space Command, and United States Tenth Fleet; 2022–2025	Succeeded by Heidi Berg
