= Charles L. Moore =

U.S. Cyber Command deputy commander

Charles L. Moore Jr.
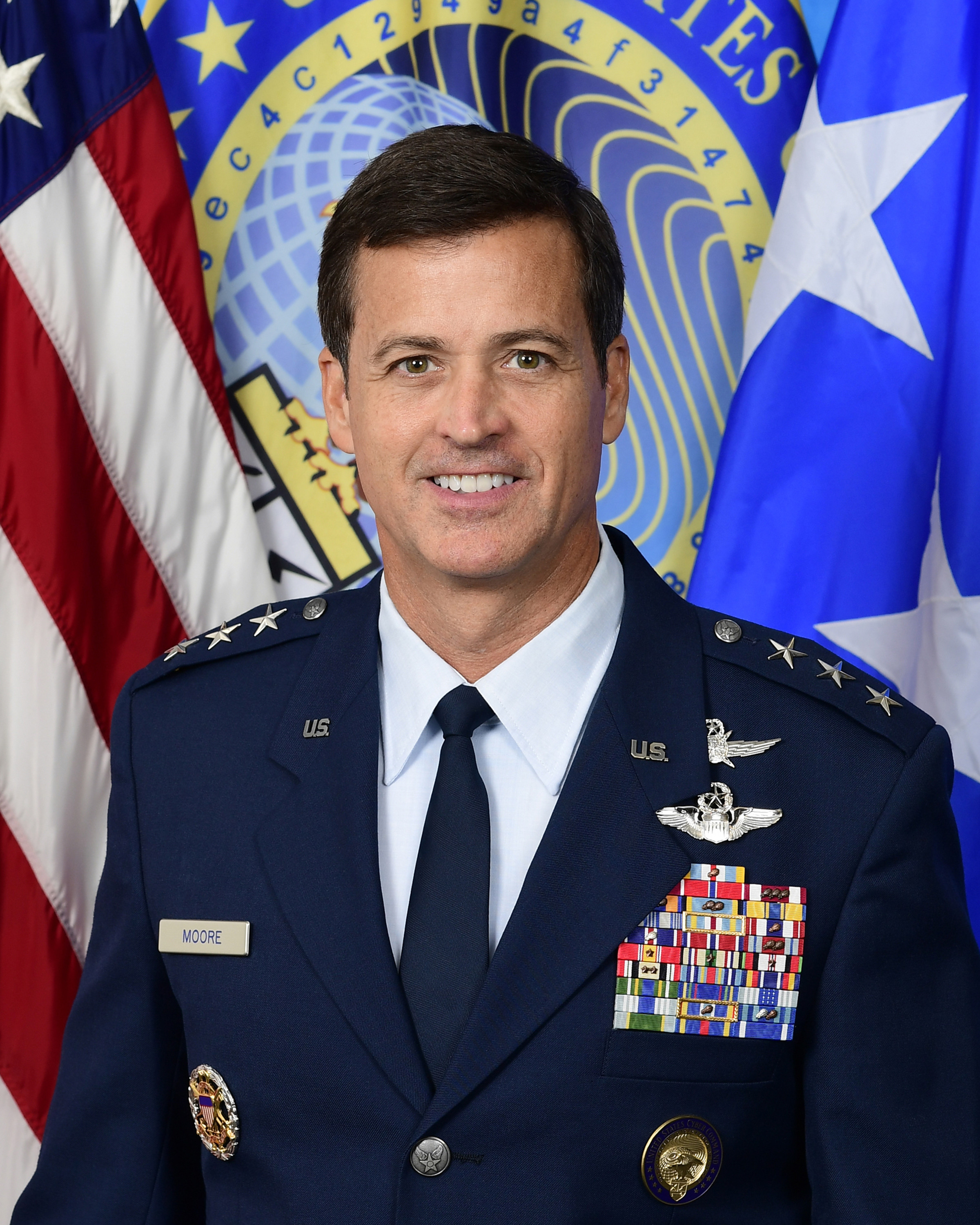
- Born: October 3, 1966 (age 60); Charleston, South Carolina, U.S.
- Education: United States Air Force Academy (BS); Troy University (MA); Air Command and Staff College (MA)
- Military career
- Allegiance: United States
- Branch: United States Air Force
- Service years: 1989–2022
- Rank: Lieutenant general
- Nickname: Tuna
- Commands: 332nd Expeditionary Operations Group; 20th Fighter Wing; 57th Wing
- Conflicts: War in Afghanistan; Iraq War
- Awards: Defense Superior Service Medal (2); Legion of Merit (2); Bronze Star Medal

Charles L. Moore Jr. (born October 3, 1966) is a retired United States Air Force lieutenant general who last served as deputy commander of the United States Cyber Command. He previously was the Deputy Director for Global Operations of the Joint Staff. In July 2020, the United States Senate confirmed his promotion to lieutenant general and nomination to become the deputy commander of the Cyber Command, replacing United States Navy Vice Admiral Ross A. Myers.

During his career Moore was an F-16 Fighting Falcon pilot and also served as an instructor pilot at the USAF Weapons School. He has over 3,000 hours of flight time, including 640 combat hours. His commands included the 555th Fighter Squadron, 332nd Expeditionary Operations Group, 20th Fighter Wing, and 57th Wing.

== Awards and decorations ==
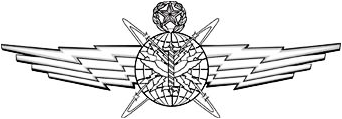
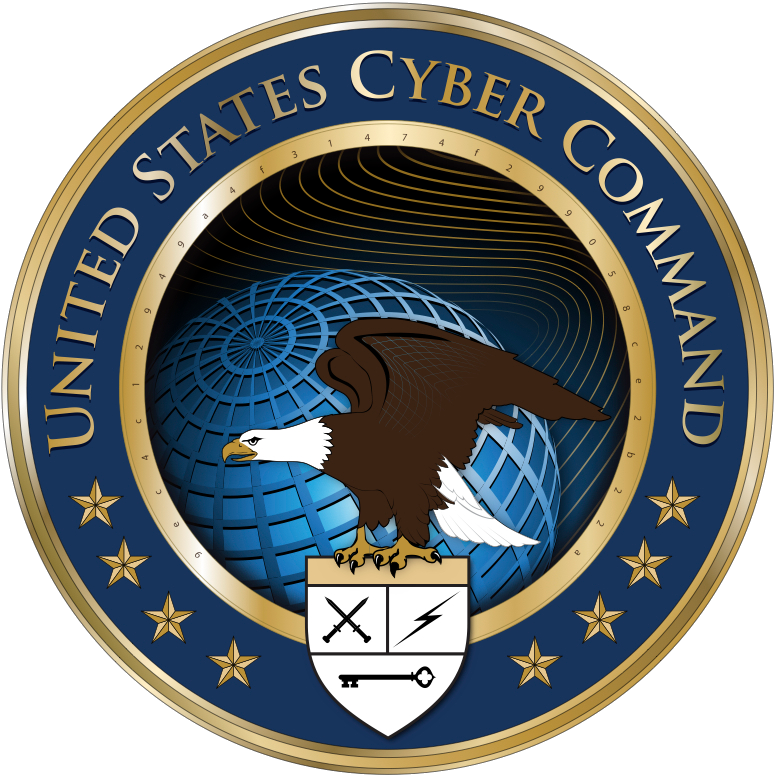
Master Cyberspace Operator Badge
US Air Force Command Pilot Badge
United States Cyber Command Badge
Joint Chiefs of Staff Badge

Defense Superior Service Medal with one bronze oak leaf cluster
Legion of Merit with oak leaf cluster
Bronze Star Medal
Meritorious Service Medal with three oak leaf clusters
Air Medal with one silver and two bronze oak leaf clusters
Aerial Achievement Medal with two oak leaf clusters
Air Force Commendation Medal
Air Force Achievement Medal
Joint Meritorious Unit Award
Air Force Meritorious Unit Award with oak leaf cluster
Air Force Outstanding Unit Award with silver oak leaf cluster
Air Force Organizational Excellence Award
Combat Readiness Medal with two oak leaf clusters
National Defense Service Medal with one bronze service star
Southwest Asia Service Medal with service star
Afghanistan Campaign Medal with service star
Iraq Campaign Medal with two service stars
Global War on Terrorism Expeditionary Medal
Global War on Terrorism Service Medal
Korea Defense Service Medal
Nuclear Deterrence Operations Service Medal
Air Force Overseas Short Tour Service Ribbon
Air Force Overseas Long Tour Service Ribbon
Air Force Expeditionary Service Ribbon with gold frame and oak leaf cluster
Air Force Longevity Service Award with one silver and two bronze oak leaf clusters
Small Arms Expert Marksmanship Ribbon
Air Force Training Ribbon
NATO Medal for the former Yugoslavia

== Effective dates of promotions ==
Rank	Date
Second Lieutenant	May 31, 1989
First Lieutenant	May 31, 1991
Captain	May 31, 1993
Major	April 1, 1998
Lieutenant Colonel	March 1, 2003
Colonel	January 1, 2007
Brigadier General	November 2, 2012
Major General	August 5, 2016
Lieutenant General	September 3, 2020

Military offices
Preceded by James Cobb	NORAD Vice Director of Operations; 2008–2010	Succeeded by ???
Preceded by Joseph T. Guastella	Commander of the 20th Fighter Wing; 2010–2012	Succeeded by Clay Hall
Preceded by Terrence J. O'Shaughnessy	Commander of the 57th Wing; 2012–2014	Succeeded by Christopher Short
Preceded by ???	Deputy Chief of the Office of Security Cooperation-Iraq; 2014–2015	Succeeded by Brian Killough
Preceded by David Béen	Deputy Director of Global Operations of the Joint Staff; 2015–2017	Succeeded by Alexus Grynkewich
Preceded by George J. Franz III	Director of Operations of the United States Cyber Command; 2017–2020	Succeeded by Kevin B. Kennedy Jr.
Preceded by Ross A. Myers	Deputy Commander of the United States Cyber Command; 2020–2022	Succeeded by Timothy D. Haugh
