= Structure of the United States Navy =

The structure of the United States Navy consists of four main bodies: the Office of the Secretary of the Navy, the Office of the Chief of Naval Operations, the operating forces (described below), and the Shore Establishment.

== Office of the Chief of Naval Operations ==
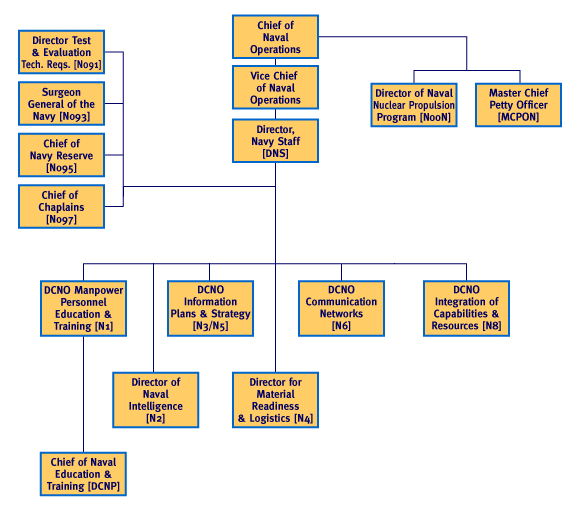
Organizational chart of the Office of the Chief of Naval Operations (OPNAV).

The chief of naval operations presides over the Navy Staff, formally known as the Office of the Chief of Naval Operations (OPNAV). The Office of the Chief of Naval Operations is a statutory organization within the executive part of the Department of the Navy, and its purpose is to furnish professional assistance to the secretary of the Navy (SECNAV) and the chief of naval operations (CNO) in carrying out their responsibilities.

The OPNAV organization consists of:

- The chief of naval operations (CNO)
- The vice chief of naval operations (VCNO), the principal deputy of the chief of naval operations, delegated complete authority to act for the CNO in all matters not specifically reserved by law to the CNO.
  - The director of the Navy Staff (DNS).
  - Several deputy chiefs of naval operations (DCNOs) of either three or two-star rank, heading functional directorates.
    - (N1) DCNO Personnel, Manpower, and Training/Chief of Naval Personnel
    - (N2/N6) DCNO Information Warfare/Director of Naval Intelligence
    - (N3/N5) DCNO Operations, Plans, and Strategy
    - (N4) DCNO Installations & Logistics
    - (N8) DCNO Integration of Capabilities & Resources
    - (N7) DCNO Warfighting Development
    - (N9) DCNO Warfare Systems
  - (N00D) The master chief petty officer of the Navy (MCPON), appointed by the chief of naval operations to serve as a spokesperson to address the issues of enlisted personnel to the highest positions in the Navy.
  - (N00N) The director of the Naval Nuclear Propulsion Program, a unique eight-year posting held by a 4 star admiral, which was originally created and served in by Admiral Hyman G. Rickover. The appointment as Director is both a military and civilian position as it is the head of the Naval Nuclear Propulsion Program in the Department of the Navy and deputy administrator for the Office of Naval Reactors of the National Nuclear Security Administration in the Department of Energy.
  - (N093) The surgeon general of the Navy, the most senior officer in the Medical Corps who heads the Bureau of Medicine and Surgery (BUMED).
  - (N095) The chief of Navy Reserve/commander, Navy Reserve Force.
  - (N097) The chief of chaplains.
- In addition, there are officials who are by either law or regulation part of the Office of the Secretary of the Navy (also known as the Secretariat), but who advise the CNO and OPNAV, on an additional duty basis, within their area of specialty, these include:
  - (N09C) Special Assistant for Public Affairs Support, additional duty for the Chief of Information (CHINFO).
  - (N09G) Special Assistant for Inspection Support, additional duty for the Naval Inspector General (NIG).
  - (N09J) Special Assistant for Legal Services, additional duty for the Judge Advocate General of the Navy (JAG).
  - (N09L) Special Assistant for Legislative Support, additional duty for the Chief of Legislative Affairs (CLA).
  - (N09N) Special Assistant for Naval Investigative Matters and Security, additional duty for the Director of the Naval Criminal Investigative Service.

Policy documents emanating from the CNO are issued in the form of OPNAV Instructions.

OPNAV is one of the three headquarters staffs in Department of the Navy mainly based at the Pentagon, with the others being the Office of the Secretary of the Navy and Headquarters Marine Corps.

== Operating forces ==
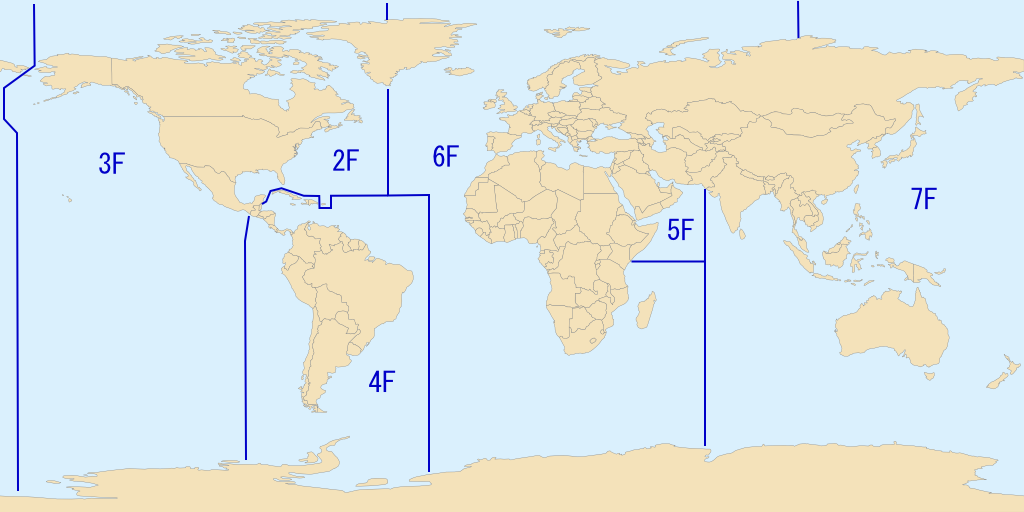
Numbered fleets of the United States Navy

The operating forces consists of nine components:

- United States Fleet Forces Command/Naval Forces Northern Command
- United States Pacific Fleet
- United States Naval Forces Central Command
- United States Naval Forces Southern Command
- United States Naval Forces Europe-Africa
- U.S. Fleet Cyber Command
- United States Navy Reserve
- United States Naval Special Warfare Command
- Operational Test and Evaluation Force

Fleets in the United States Navy take on the role of force provider; they do not carry out military operations independently, rather they train and maintain naval units that will subsequently be provided to the naval forces component of each Unified Combatant Command. While not widely publicized, groups of ships departing U.S. waters for operational missions gain a Task force type designation, almost always with the Second or Third Fleets. On entry into another numbered fleet's area of responsibility, they are redesignated as a task group from that fleet. For example, a carrier task group departing the Eastern Seaboard for the Mediterranean might start out as Task Group 20.1; on crossing the mid-Atlantic boundary between Fleet Forces Command and United States Naval Forces Europe - Naval Forces Africa, it might become ('inchop') Task Group 60.1.

=== Numbered fleets ===
The United States Navy currently has seven active numbered fleets. Various other fleets have existed, but are not currently active.

U.S. Navy Numbered Fleets (2015)
Numbered Fleet	Status	Parent Command	Geographic Region	Notes
1st Fleet	Inactive	Pacific Fleet	N/A	The First Fleet was created in 1947 in the Pacific. It was deactivated when the Third Fleet assumed its responsibilities in early 1973. The United States Coast Guard has sometimes informally been called the "First Fleet."
2nd Fleet	Active	Fleet Forces Command	Western North Atlantic Ocean	The Second Fleet was redesignated from the Second Task Fleet in 1950 as part of the then-United States Atlantic Fleet. It was deactivated in 2011, then reactivated on 4 May 2018.
3rd Fleet	Active	Pacific Fleet	Eastern Pacific Ocean	The Third Fleet was active during World War II and was deactivated in 1945. It was reactivated in early 1973 when it assumed the responsibilities previously assigned to the First Fleet.
4th Fleet	Active	Naval Forces Southern Command	Southern Atlantic Ocean	The Fourth Fleet was active during World War II and deactivated in 1950 when its responsibilities passed to Second Fleet. It was reactivated in 2008.
5th Fleet	Active	Naval Forces Central Command	Persian Gulf, Red Sea, and part of Indian Ocean	The Fifth Fleet was deactivated in 1947 after serving during World War II. It was reactivated in 1995 to assume responsibilities in the Persian Gulf previously assigned to Seventh Fleet.
6th Fleet	Active	Naval Forces Europe	Eastern North Atlantic Ocean and Mediterranean	The Sixth Fleet was redesignated from Sixth Task Fleet in 1950 and has been continuously active in the Mediterranean since 1950.
7th Fleet	Active	Pacific Fleet	Western Pacific Ocean & Indian Ocean	The Seventh Fleet was activated in 1943, redesignated Naval Forces Western Pacific in 1947, Seventh Task Fleet in 1949 and to its current designation in 1950.
8th Fleet	Inactive	Atlantic Fleet	N/A	The Eighth Fleet was established in 1943 from Northwest African Force. It operated in the Mediterranean Sea during World War II, with its forces briefly reassigned to Twelfth Fleet. From 1946-47 served as the heavy striking arm of the United States Atlantic Fleet before being redesignated Second Task Fleet and later Second Fleet.
9th Fleet	Inactive	Atlantic and Pacific	N/A	Before 15 March 1943, Commander, U.S. Naval Forces Europe served as Commander Task Force 99, of the 9th Fleet, which was under the direct command of Admiral King. On 15 March 1943, TF 99 was redesignated TF 92. On 15 August, the 9th Fleet was redesignated 11th Fleet, still under the direct command of Admiral King, and TF 92 was redesignated TF 112. Task Forces in the 90s series have been used since World War II. In 1945, under Admiral Nimitz, CINCPOA, as Commander Ninth Fleet, Task Forces 90-92 formed the North Pacific Force, and the higher numbers were used for Strategic Air Force, POA, and local defences (Marshals-Gilberts Force, Hawaiian Sea Frontier, etc.). Naval Forces Far East used 90-series task forces in Korea.
10th Fleet	Active	Fleet Cyber Command	Global	The Tenth Fleet was active during World War II and reactivated in 2010 for assignment to Fleet Cyber Command.
11th Fleet	Inactive	Pacific Fleet and Atlantic Fleet	N/A	Redesignated on 15 August 1943 from 9th Fleet and subsequently transferred to Atlantic Fleet
12th Fleet	Inactive	Naval Forces Europe	N/A	The Twelfth Fleet was active in European waters during World War II. It was redesignated United States Naval Forces Mediterranean in 1946, which later became Sixth Task Fleet.

Additional numbered fleets have existed; for a period after World War II, the Sixteenth and Nineteenth Fleets were assigned as the reserve elements for Atlantic and Pacific Fleets.

=== Organization ===
The organization of the Navy has changed incrementally over time. During World War II administrative organization for many ship types included divisions, for example Battleship Divisions (abbreviated BatDivs), Cruiser Divisions, Destroyer Divisions, or Escort Divisions (CortDivs, also rendered ComCortDiv for Commander, Escort Division), usually composed of two ships, often members of the same class. These made up squadrons (e.g. Battle Squadron, Cruiser Squadron, Escort Squadron (CortRon) etc.) of several divisions. Yet the exigencies of World War II forced the creation of the task force system where ships no longer fought solely as part of same-type divisions or squadrons. This was gradually reflected in administrative arrangements; by the 1970s, formations such as Cruiser-Destroyer Groups (CruDesGrus) came into existence.

The Navy is currently organized as such:

- U.S. Fleet Forces Command / Naval Forces Northern Command
  - Type commands, including Submarine Force U.S. Atlantic Fleet, Surface Forces Atlantic, and Naval Air Forces Atlantic
  - Second Fleet operates in the Atlantic Ocean from the North to South Pole, from the Eastern United States to Western Europe and Africa, and along both the eastern and western shores of Central and South America. Second Fleet is the sole operational fleet within Fleet Forces Command, providing force training and exercises of assigned maritime forces and providing combat-ready Naval forces to support Service missions and global requirements. Second Fleet works with the Combined Joint Operations from the Sea/Center of Excellence to complete its mission.
  - Military Sealift Command (MSC) serves not only the United States Navy, but the entire Department of Defense as an ocean carrier of materiel. It transports equipment, fuel, ammunition, and other goods essential to the smooth function of United States armed forces worldwide. Up to 95% of all supplies needed to sustain the U.S. military can be moved by Military Sealift Command. MSC operates approximately 120 ships with 100 more in reserve. Ships of the command are not crewed by active duty Navy personnel, but by civil service or contracted merchant mariners.
  - Navy Expeditionary Combat Command (NECC), established in January 2006, serves as the single functional command for the Navy's expeditionary forces and as central management for the readiness, resources, manning, training and equipping of those forces. NECC capabilities include; Explosive Ordnance Disposal, Maritime Expeditionary Security, Riverine, Diving Operations, Naval Construction, Maritime Civil Affairs, Expeditionary Training, Expeditionary Logistics, Expeditionary Intelligence, Combat Camera, and Expeditionary Combat Readiness. The Maritime Expeditionary Security Force's (MESF) (formerly known as Naval Coastal Warfare) primary mission is force protection conducted through fleet support with operations around the world. Two Maritime Expeditionary Security Groups in San Diego and Portsmouth, Va. supervise integration of coastal warfare assets trained to operate in high density, multi-threat environments. Coastal and harbor defense and protection of naval assets are placed under the jurisdiction of two Naval Coastal Warfare Groups: one for the Pacific Fleet and one for the Atlantic Fleet.
- U.S. Naval Forces Europe - Naval Forces Africa / Sixth Fleet
  - The Sixth Fleet is deployed in the Mediterranean Sea and Black Sea, under the administrative direction of U.S. Naval Forces Europe (NAVEUR), and the operational command of U.S. European Command. Sixth Fleet is based in Naples, Italy and its flagship is USS Mount Whitney (LCC-20). Sixth Fleet also provides Mount Whitney as an Afloat Command Platform for Naval Striking and Support Forces NATO, a Naples-based Maritime headquarters that serves as a deployable Maritime Component Commander as directed by Supreme Headquarters Allied Powers Europe (SHAPE).
- U.S. Pacific Fleet
  - Type commands, including Submarine Forces Pacific, Surface Force Pacific, and Naval Air Forces Pacific
  - Third Fleet's jurisdiction is the Northern, Southern, and Eastern Pacific Ocean along with the West Coast of the United States. Normally, units assigned to Third Fleet undergo training cruises prior to deployment with either the Fifth Fleet or Seventh Fleet and are not intended for immediate use in battle. Only in the event of general war does Third Fleet participate in active combat operations. Forming part of the Pacific Fleet, Third Fleet is based in San Diego, California, and is a part of U.S. Indo-Pacific Command (INDOPACOM).
  - Seventh Fleet, the largest forward-deployed U.S. fleet, operates in the Western Pacific and the Indian Ocean, stretching to the Persian Gulf and including much of the east coast of Africa. It forms the fully combat ready part of the Pacific Fleet and provides naval units to INDOPACOM. At any given time, Seventh Fleet consists of 40-50 ships operating from bases in South Korea, Japan, and Guam. It is headquartered at Yokosuka, Kanagawa, Japan, with USS Blue Ridge (LCC-19) as its flagship.
  - Naval shore commands: Commander Naval Forces Korea (CNFK), Commander Naval Forces Marianas (CNFM), and Commander Naval Forces Japan (CNFJ).
- U.S. Naval Forces Central Command (NAVCENT) / Fifth Fleet
  - Fifth Fleet's area of responsibility is the Middle East, including the Persian Gulf, Red Sea, Gulf of Oman, and parts of the Indian Ocean. Consisting of around 25 ships, including a carrier strike group and an expeditionary strike group, Fifth Fleet is effectively fused with U.S. Naval Forces Central Command, which is the naval component of USCENTCOM. Fifth Fleet is headquartered at Manama, Bahrain.
  - NAVCENT includes a number of Task Forces which are not part of the Fifth Fleet. These include Combined Task Force 150, carrying out maritime surveillance activities in the Gulf of Oman and around the Horn of Africa, and Task Force 152, covering the southern Persian Gulf with the same role. Both Task Forces report to Commander NAVCENT in his role as Combined Maritime Forces Component Commander.
- U.S. Naval Forces Southern Command / Fourth Fleet
  - The Fourth Fleet has operational responsibility for U.S. Navy assets assigned from east and west coast fleets to operate in the U.S. Southern Command area. The Fourth Fleet will conduct varying missions including a range of contingency operations, counter narcoterrorism, and theater security cooperation (TSC) activities. TSC includes military-to-military interaction and bilateral training opportunities as well as humanitarian assistance and in-country partnerships.
  - U.S. Naval Forces Southern Command's (USNAVSO), the Navy component command for U.S. Southern Command, mission is to direct U.S. naval forces operating in the Caribbean, and Central and South American regions and interact with partner nation navies to shape the maritime environment.
- U.S. Fleet Cyber Command / Tenth Fleet
  - The Tenth Fleet has functional responsibility to achieve the integration and innovation necessary for warfighting superiority across the full spectrum of military operations in the maritime, cyberspace and information domains. Tenth Fleet has operational control of Navy cyber forces to execute the full spectrum of computer network operations, cyber warfare, electronic warfare, information operations and signal intelligence capabilities and missions across the cyber, electromagnetic and space domains. Tenth Fleet also partner with and support other fleet commanders to provide guidance and direction to ensure coordinated, synchronized and effective preventative and response capability in cyberspace. U.S. Fleet Cyber Command / Tenth Fleet is a subcomponent of U.S. Cyber Command.
- U.S. Naval Special Warfare Command
  - Commissioned on 16 April 1987, at Naval Amphibious Base Coronado, in San Diego, California. It acts as the Naval component of the United States Special Operations Command, headquartered in Tampa, Florida. Naval Special Warfare Command provides vision, leadership, doctrinal guidance, resources and oversight to ensure component maritime special operations forces are ready to meet the operational requirements of combatant commanders. The NSW has 5,400 total active-duty personnel, including 2,450 SEALs and 600 Special Warfare Combatant-craft Crewmen. NSW also maintains a 1,200-person reserve of approximately 325 SEALs, 125 SWCC and 775 support personnel.

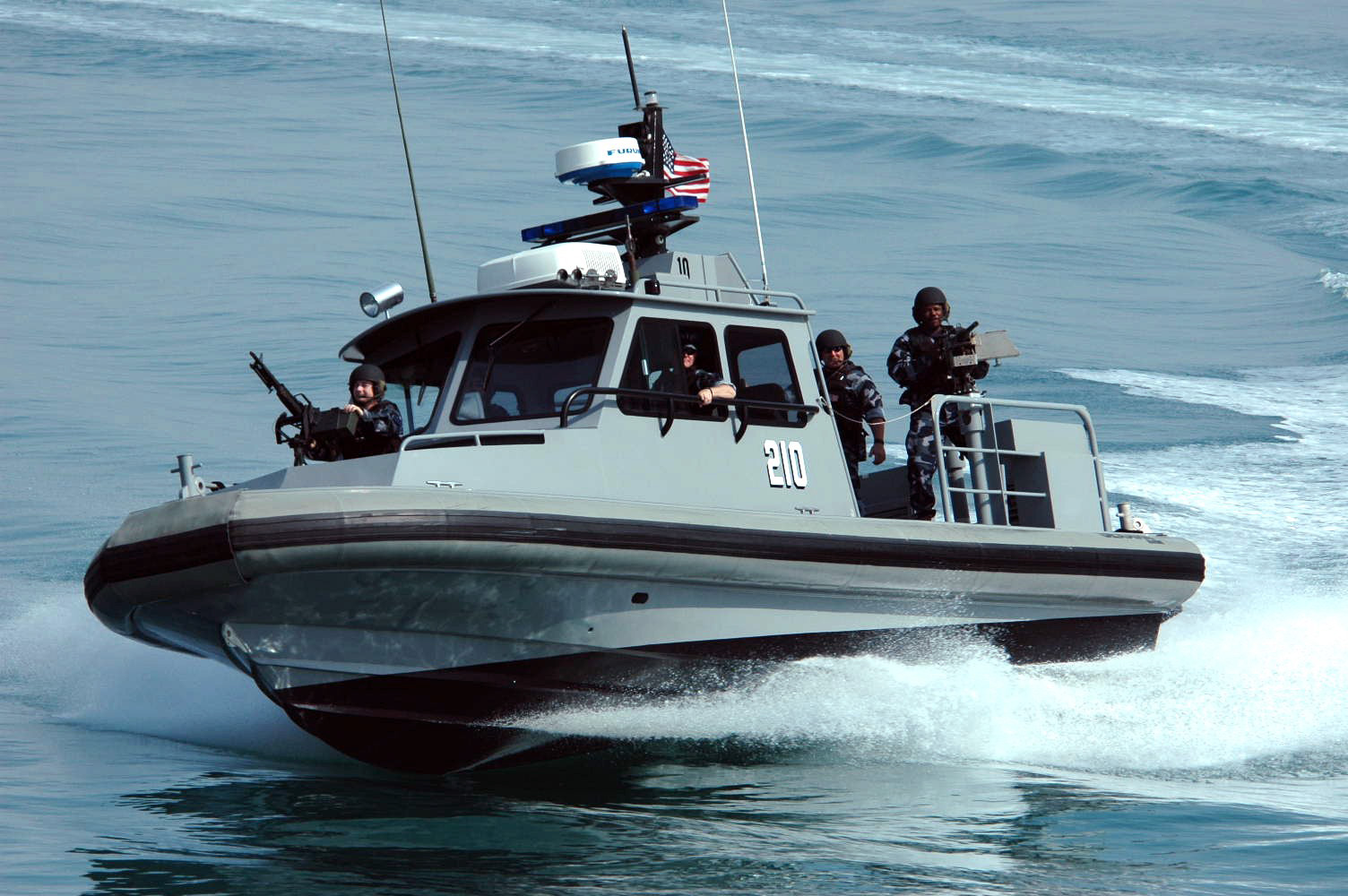
Members of Inshore Boat Unit 24 patrol near Kuwait Naval Base.

The Navy maintains several "Naval Forces Commands" which operate naval shore facilities and serve as liaison units to local ground forces of the Air Force and Army. Such commands are answerable to a Fleet Commander as the shore protector component of the afloat command. In times of war, Commander Naval Forces Korea becomes a Task Force (Task Force 78) of the United States Seventh Fleet. Other Naval Force Commands may similarly augment to become number fleet task forces.

== The Shore Establishment ==
- "The shore establishment provides support to the operating forces (known as "the fleet") in the form of: facilities for the repair of machinery and electronics; communications centers; training areas and simulators; ship and aircraft repair; intelligence and meteorological support; storage areas for repair parts, fuel, and munitions; medical and dental facilities; and air bases."

The following shore-based bureaus, commands and components are directly subordinate to the chief of naval operations:"

Office of the Chief of Naval Operations
Bureau of Naval Personnel
Bureau of Medicine and Surgery

- Naval Sea Systems Command
- Naval Air Systems Command
- Naval Facilities Engineering Systems Command
- Naval Supply Systems Command
- Naval Information Warfare Systems Command
- Strategic Systems Programs
- United States Naval Academy
- Naval Education and Training Command
- Naval Meteorology and Oceanography Command
- Office of Naval Intelligence
- Naval Strike and Air Warfare Center
- Naval Legal Service Command
- United States Naval Observatory
- Naval Safety Command
- Commander, Navy Installations Command

== Relationships with other service branches ==
=== United States Marine Corps ===
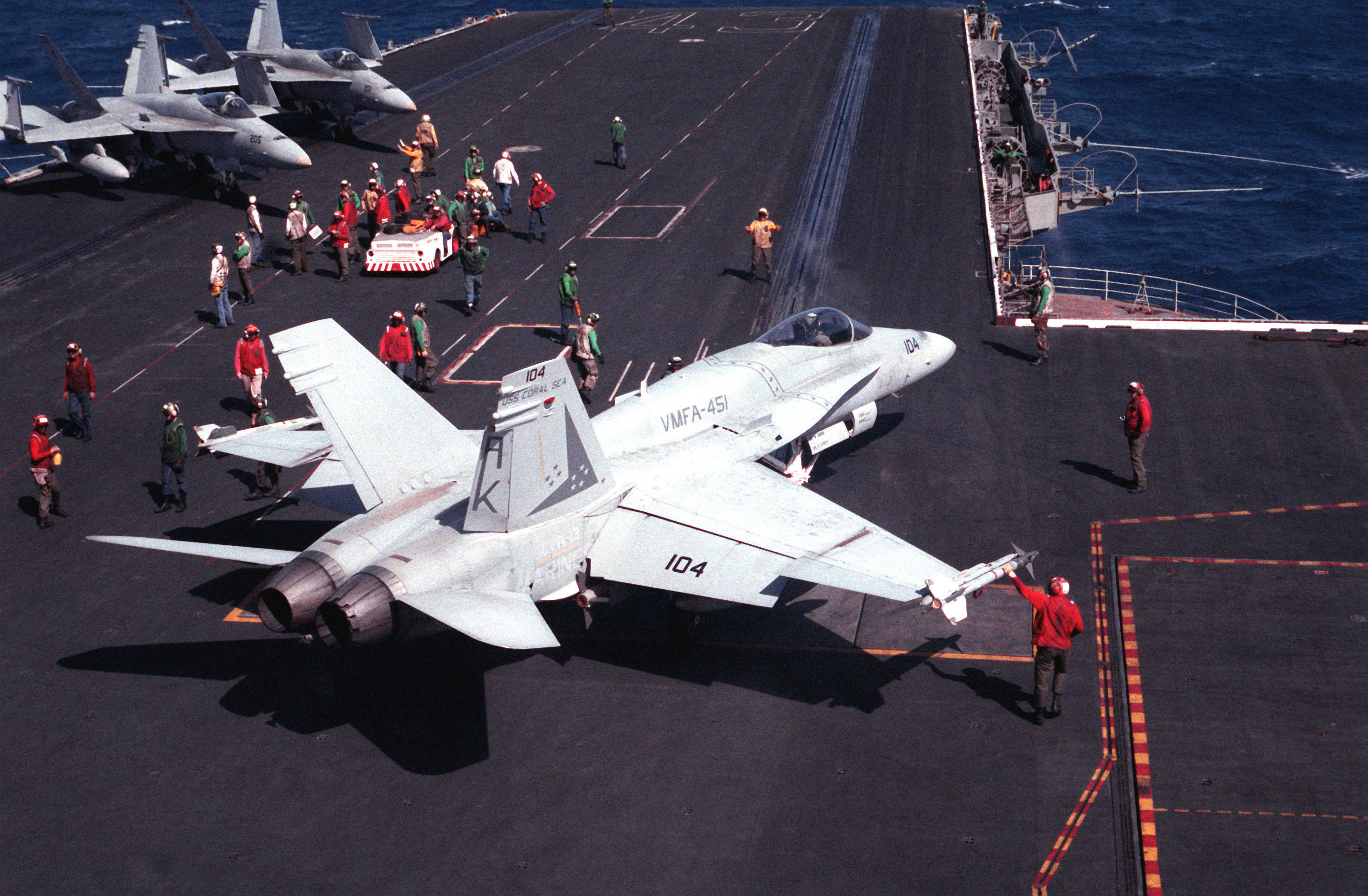
A Marine F/A-18 from VMFA-451 prepares to launch from USS Coral Sea (CV-43)

Per sections 8001(a)(2), 8061, 8061(4), and 8063 of title 10, U.S. Code, the United States Marine Corps is (1) a separate branch of the naval service from the U.S. Navy; (2) the Department of the Navy and the U.S. Navy are distinct legal entities; (3) is, along with the U.S. Navy (and U.S. Coast Guard, when assigned) a component of the Department of the Navy; and (4) a branch of U.S. military service, separate from the U.S. Navy, within the Department of the Navy. Furthermore, per sections 8001(a)(1), 5061(4), and 5062(a) of title 10, U.S. Code, (1) the United States Navy does not include the United States Marine Corps (2); the U.S. Marine Corps is a separate component service, from either the U.S. Navy or the U.S. Coast Guard within the Department of the Navy; and (3) the U.S. Marine Corps is not a component of the U.S. Navy.

In 1834, the United States Marine Corps (USMC) came under the Department of the Navy. Historically, the United States Navy has enjoyed a unique relationship with the Marines, partly because they both specialize in seaborne operations. At the highest level of civilian organization, the USMC is part of the Department of the Navy and reports to the secretary of the Navy. However, it is considered to be a distinct, separate service branch and not a subset of the Navy; the highest ranking Marine officer, the commandant of the Marine Corps, does not report to a Navy officer. Marine Corps Medal of Honor recipients are awarded the Navy variant, and Marines are eligible to receive the Navy Cross. The United States Naval Academy trains Marine Corps commissioned officers while prospective Navy officers undergo instruction by Marine NCO Drill Instructors at OCS. Naval Aviation includes Navy and Marine aviators, flight officers, and aircrew.

The relationship extends to the operational theater as well. As amphibious assault specialists, Marines often deploy on, and attack from, Navy vessels; while being transported on Navy ships, they must obey the orders of the captain of the vessel. Marine aviation tailhook squadrons train and operate alongside Navy squadrons, flying similar missions and often flying sorties together. Other types of Marine air squadrons operate from amphibious assault ships in support of Marine amphibious operations. Navy and Marine squadrons use the same NATOPS aviation manuals and procedures. The USMC does not train chaplains, hospital corpsmen or medical doctors; thus officers and enlisted sailors from the Navy fulfill these roles. They generally wear Marine uniforms that are emblazoned with Navy insignia and markings to distinguish themselves from marines. Corpsmen and chaplains enjoy a great sense of camaraderie with the Marines due in part because they work closely with them and often are embedded with Marine units. They operate under the command of the Marine Corps under the auspices of the Fleet Marine Force, often called the "green side".

Because of the lack of full-scale amphibious operations in recent conflicts, there has been pressure to cut the "gator navy" below the two-regiment requirement of the Marines. This is a reduction from the programmatic goal of 2.5 Marine Expeditionary Brigades and actual structure of 2.07 MEB equivalents in 1999.

The relationship between the US Navy and US Marine Corps is also one of mutual respect, and that respect is manifested in various policies and procedural regulations. For example, per US Marine and Navy drill manuals, in a formation consisting of both Marine and Navy units, per MCO P5060.20, Marine Corps Drill and Ceremonies Manual, Paragraph 15001. "ARRANGEMENT OF UNITS IN FORMATION 1. In ceremonies involving the U.S. Marine Corps and U.S. Navy units, the Marine unit shall be on the right of line or head of the column. The senior line officer, regardless of service, functions as the commander of troops." (As this is a Department of Defense/Department of the Navy regulation, no further 10 U.S. Code authority, other than already cited above, is required for the Secretary of the Navy, who supervises both the U.S Navy, and the U.S. Marine Corps, as well as the U.S. Coast Guard whenever it is assigned to the Department of the Navy, to specify that the Marine Corps takes precedence over the Navy and Coast Guard in Naval formations, parades, and ceremonies. This same military precedence is specified in DoD Instruction 1005.8 and U.S. Navy Regulations, Chapter 10, Paragraph 1007.) This is a symbol of the special status and honor granted to US Marines, and is a unique aspect of the Navy-Marine relationship.

=== United States Coast Guard ===
The United States Coast Guard fulfills a law enforcement role in naval operations. It provides Law Enforcement Detachments (LEDETs) to Navy vessels, where they perform arrests and other law enforcement duties during Navy boarding and interdiction missions. In times of war, or when directed by the president, the Coast Guard operates as a service in the Navy and is subject to the orders of the secretary of the Navy until it is transferred back to the Department of Homeland Security. At other times, Coast Guard Port Security Units are sent overseas to guard the security of ports and other assets. The Coast Guard also jointly staffs the Navy's Naval Coastal Warfare Groups and Squadrons (the latter of which were known as Harbor Defense Commands until late-2004), which oversee defense efforts in foreign littoral combat and inshore areas. Additionally, Coast Guard and Navy vessels sometimes operate together in search and rescue operations.
