= Ross A. Myers =

Retired American admiral (b. 1959)

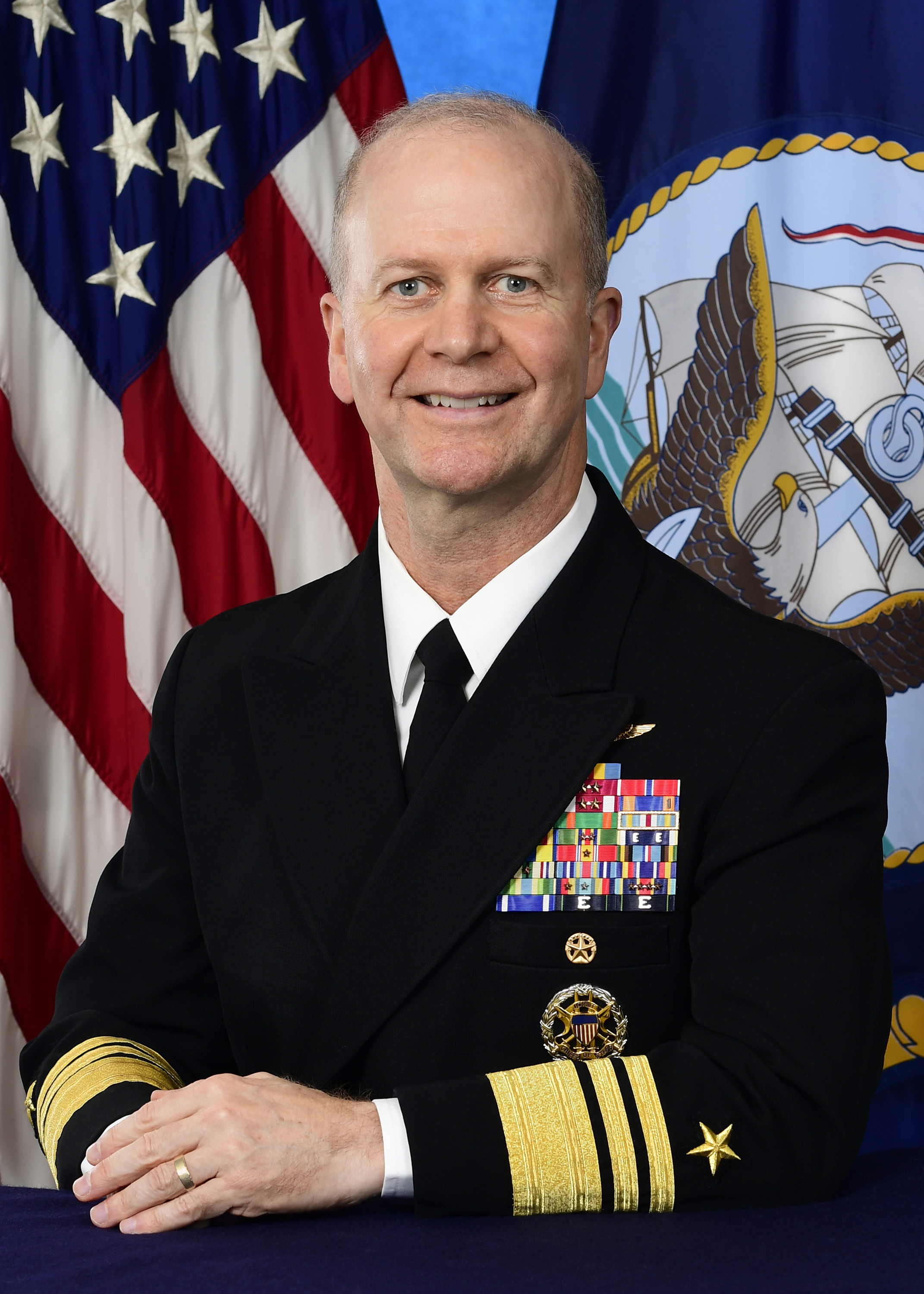
- Vice Admiral Ross A. Myers in August 2020
- Born: 1959 (age 66–67)
- Military career
- Allegiance: United States
- Branch: United States Navy
- Service years: 1986–2022
- Rank: Vice Admiral
- Commands: U.S. Fleet Cyber Command; United States Tenth Fleet; Navy Space Command; Carrier Air Wing Five
- Awards: Defense Distinguished Service Medal; Defense Superior Service Medal; Legion of Merit (3); Bronze Star Medal

Ross Allen Myers (born 1959) is an American naval aviator and a retired vice admiral in the United States Navy, who served as deputy commander of the United States Cyber Command from May 2019 to September 2020. He was nominated in March 2020 to be the commander of the United States Tenth Fleet/U.S. Fleet Cyber Command, replacing retiring Vice Admiral Timothy J. White. As a naval aviator, he has commanded several warships and military units, including fleet replacement squadron, Carrier air wing, and air group.

As part of Sailors' Union of the Pacific, he served twice at Naval Air Facility Atsugi, as a commander for Carrier Air Wing Five military unit stationed at Japan.

== Education ==
Myers was raised in Garden City, Kansas. He completed a Bachelor of Science in Accounting at Kansas State University and, later, went to the University of Kansas where he graduated with a Master of Business Administration. After completing his master's degree, he then attended the National War College where he read for a Master of Science in National Security Strategy.

== Naval career ==
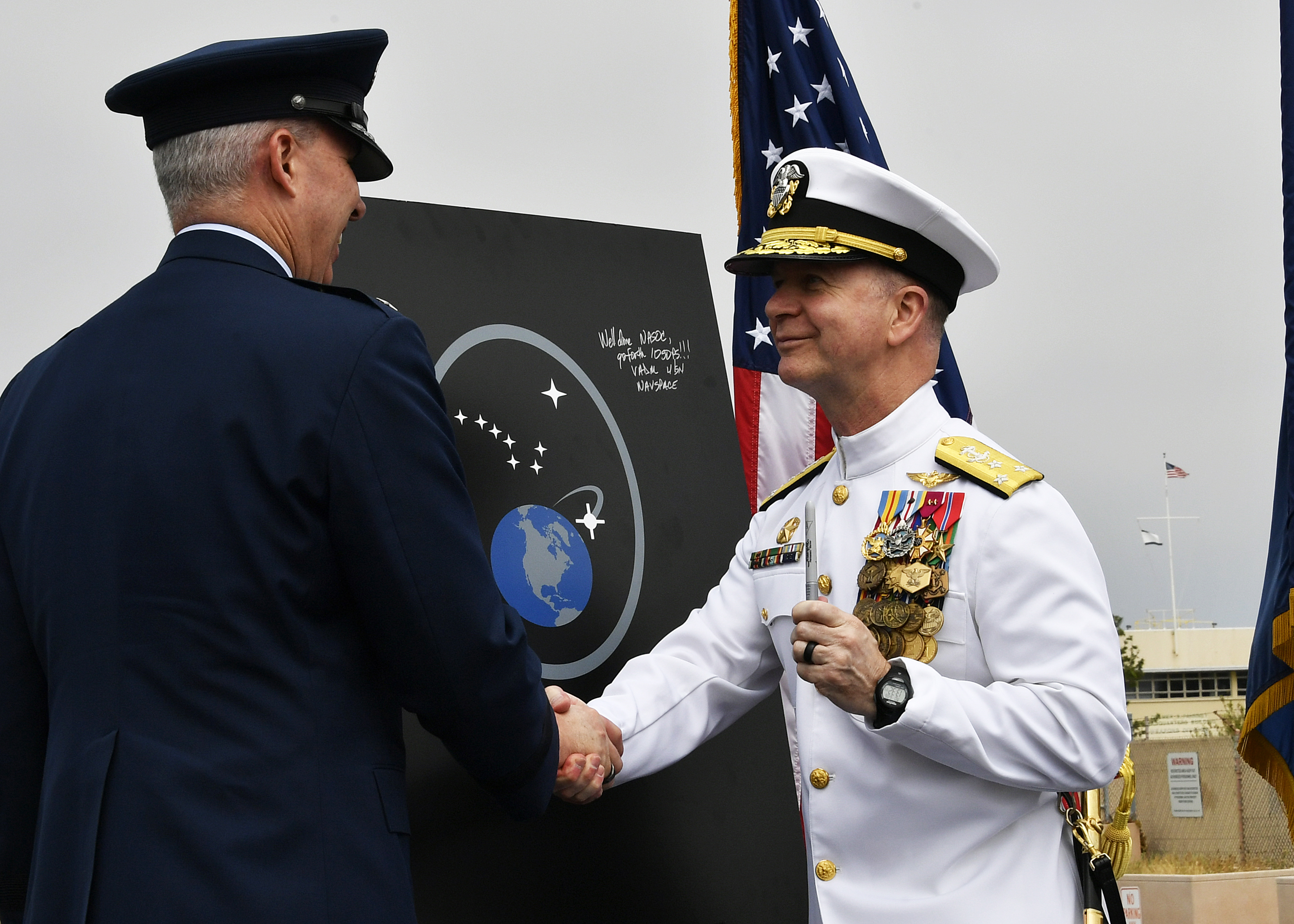
Myers (right) and Space Force Lieutenant General Stephen Whiting at the joint NAVSOC/10 SOPS transfer ceremony at Point Mugu on 6 June 2022.

In shore and staff tours, Myers has serving as a flag aide for the commander in chief Allied Naval Forces Southern Europe in Italy and for the commander in chief United States Naval Forces Europe in England. He also served as joint assessments analyst and executive assistant for assessments, resources, and warfare requirements to the Deputy Chief of Naval Operations, and as deputy executive assistant to the Chief of Naval Operations. He was later appointed to assistant deputy director for global operations to the Joint Staff, and executive assistant to the Vice Chairman of the Joint Chiefs of Staff. As a flag officer, he served on the Joint Staff as vice deputy director for Nuclear, Homeland Defense and Current Operations, and director of Plans and Policy at headquarters U.S. Cyber Command. In May 2019, Myers was promoted to vice admiral and appointed deputy commander of United States Cyber Command. He assumed command of United States Tenth Fleet/U.S. Fleet Cyber Command in September 2020.

== Awards and decorations ==
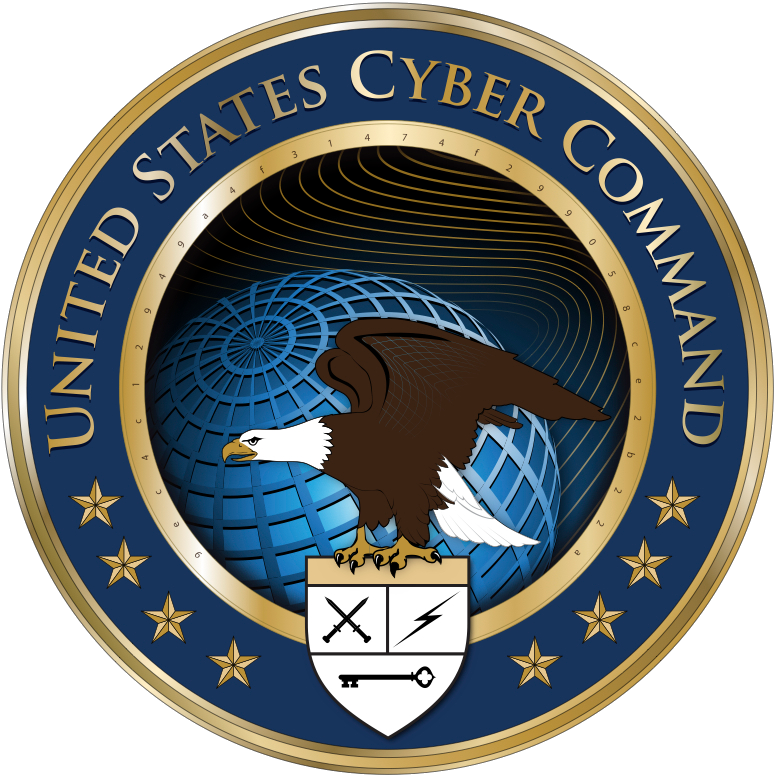
Naval Aviator insignia
Command at Sea insignia
United States Cyber Command Badge

Defense Distinguished Service Medal
Defense Superior Service Medal
Legion of Merit with two gold award stars
Bronze Star Medal
Defense Meritorious Service Medal
Meritorious Service Medal with two award stars
Air Medal with bronze Strike/Flight numeral "1"
Navy and Marine Corps Commendation Medal with two award stars
Navy and Marine Corps Achievement Medal
Joint Meritorious Unit Award
Navy Unit Commendation
Navy Meritorious Unit Commendation with two bronze service stars
Navy "E" Ribbon with two Battle E awards
Navy Expeditionary Medal
National Defense Service Medal with service star
Armed Forces Expeditionary Medal
Southwest Asia Service Medal with service star
Global War on Terrorism Expeditionary Medal
Global War on Terrorism Service Medal
Armed Forces Service Medal
Navy Sea Service Deployment Ribbon with one silver and one bronze service stars
Navy and Marine Corps Overseas Service Ribbon with four service stars
NATO Medal for the former Yugoslavia
Navy Expert Rifleman Medal
Navy Expert Pistol Shot Medal

Military offices
Preceded by Kevin Kovacich	Director of Plans and Programs of the United States Cyber Command; 2018	Succeeded by William W. Wheeler
Preceded by Stephen Fogarty	Chief of Staff of the United States Cyber Command; 2018–2019	Succeeded by John B. Morrison
Preceded by Vincent R. Stewart	Deputy Commander of the United States Cyber Command; 2019–2020	Succeeded by Charles L. Moore Jr.
Preceded by Timothy J. White	Commander of the United States Fleet Cyber Command, U.S. Tenth Fleet, Navy Space Command; 2020–2022	Succeeded by Craig Clapperton
