= Michael S. Rogers =

U.S. Navy admiral and intelligence official (born 1959)

Michael Rogers
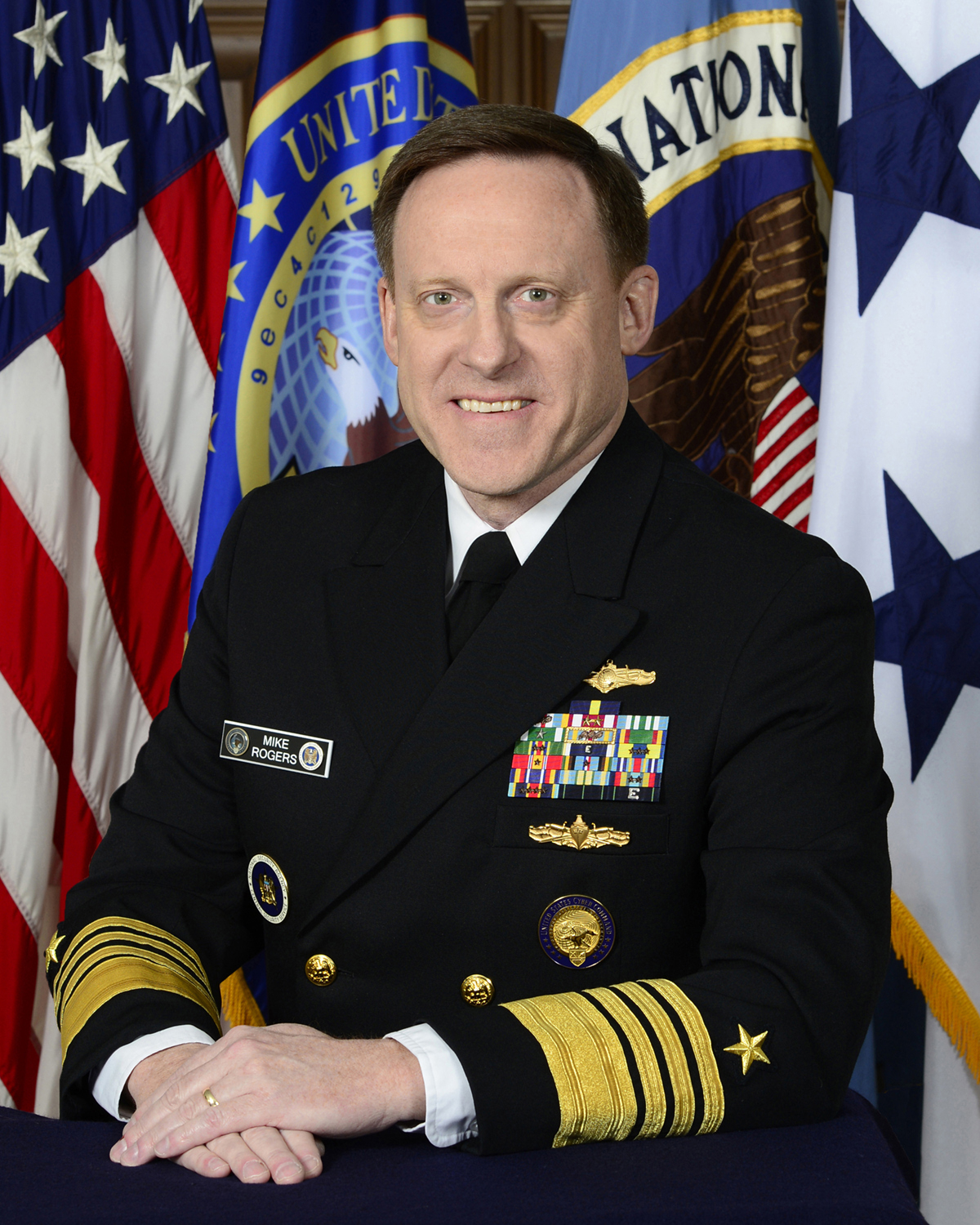

2nd Commander of United States Cyber Command
- In office April 3, 2014 – May 4, 2018
- President: Barack Obama; Donald Trump
- Preceded by: Keith B. Alexander
- Succeeded by: Paul M. Nakasone

17th Director of the National Security Agency
- In office April 3, 2014 – May 4, 2018
- President: Barack Obama; Donald Trump
- Deputy: George Barnes
- Preceded by: Keith B. Alexander
- Succeeded by: Paul M. Nakasone

Personal details
- Born: October 31, 1959 (age 66) Chicago, Illinois, U.S.
- Party: Independent
- Education: Auburn University (BA); Naval War College (MS)

Military service
- Allegiance: United States
- Branch/service: United States Navy
- Years of service: 1981–2018
- Rank: Admiral
- Commands: United States Cyber Command; National Security Agency; Central Security Service; United States Fleet Cyber Command; United States Tenth Fleet
- Battles/wars: Invasion of Grenada; Multinational Force in Lebanon
- Awards: Navy Distinguished Service Medal; Defense Superior Service Medal (3)

Michael S. Rogers (born October 31, 1959) is a retired four-star admiral of the United States Navy. Rogers served as the second commander of the United States Cyber Command (USCYBERCOM) from April 2014 to May 2018 while concurrently serving as the 17th director of the National Security Agency (NSA) and as chief of the Central Security Service (CSS). During his tenure, he helped transform and elevate U.S. Cyber Command into a unified combatant command. Rogers relinquished command to General Paul M. Nakasone on May 4, 2018 and retired from the Navy a few weeks later on June 1, 2018.

Prior to 2014, Rogers served as the Commander of the Tenth Fleet and Commander of the United States Fleet Cyber Command, with responsibility for all of the Navy's cyberwarfare efforts. In 2009, he was the director of intelligence for the Joint Chiefs of Staff after having been the director of intelligence for Pacific Command from 2007 onwards.

== Early life and education ==
Rogers was born on October 31, 1959 and is a native of Chicago, Illinois. While in middle school Rogers joined the United States Naval Sea Cadets Corps and attended an international exchange with the cadets in Canada. His time in Sea Cadet fueled his excitement about the Navy. He graduated from New Trier High School in 1977. He is a graduate of Auburn University (1981) and the Naval War College.

== Career ==
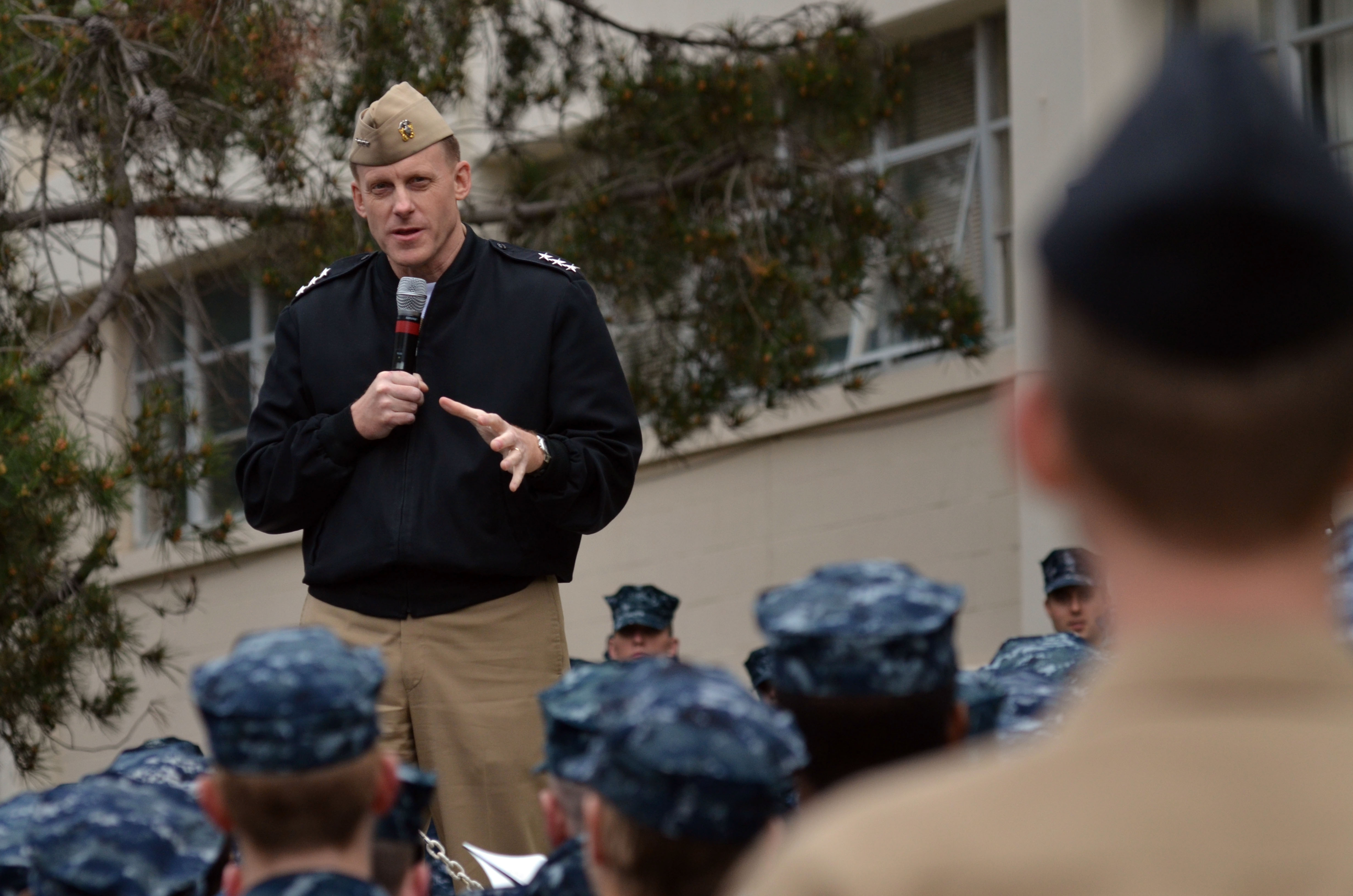
Rogers speaking to a group of sailors at the Center for Information Dominance in January 2012.

=== 1980s ===
Rogers received his commission through the Naval Reserve Officers Training Corps (NROTC) program and has served in the United States Navy since graduating from Auburn University in 1981. He started his career as a Surface Warfare Officer working in naval gunfire support operations off Grenada, Beirut, and maritime surveillance operations off El Salvador on board the USS Caron (DD-970). In 1986, he was selected for transfer from unrestricted line officer to restricted line officer and re-designation as a cryptology officer.

=== 2000s ===
During the 2003 U.S. invasion of Iraq, Rogers joined the military's Joint Staff, which works for the Joint Chiefs of Staff, where he specialized in computer network attacks. From 2007 onward he served as director of intelligence for the military's Pacific Command. In 2009, he became director of intelligence for the Joint Chiefs of Staff, and was subsequently named commander of U.S. Fleet Cyber Command and commander of the U.S. 10th Fleet, with responsibility for all of the Navy's cyberwarfare efforts. As such, Rogers was the first restricted line officer to serve as a numbered fleet commander and the first Information Warfare Community (IWC) officer to achieve the rank of vice admiral.

=== 2010s ===
In January 2014, the Obama Administration announced Rogers' nomination as director of the National Security Agency and the commander of the United States offensive cyberoperations unit in the Department of Defense. Rogers succeeded General Keith B. Alexander, who served as the NSA director for almost nine years, and became the first IWC officer to achieve the rank of admiral. Although the NSA directorship does not require Senate approval, Rogers had to be confirmed by the Senate to head United States Cyber Command, for which the Senate unanimously confirmed him.

In his first public remarks as NSA director, Rogers stated that he believed that NSA whistleblower Edward Snowden was "probably not" working for a foreign intelligence agency despite speculation to the contrary. Rogers added: "He clearly believes in what he's doing. I question that; I don't agree with it. I fundamentally disagree with what he did. I believe it was wrong; I believe it was illegal."

In January 2018, Rogers announced he would be retiring from the NSA in the spring.

In early 2019, Rogers became the chairman of the board of advisors of Claroty, a cybersecurity firm.

=== 2020s ===
In October 2022, Rogers joined the Council for Responsible Social Media project launched by Issue One to address the negative mental, civic, and public health impacts of social media in the United States. The council is co-chaired by former House Democratic Caucus Leader Dick Gephardt and former Massachusetts Lieutenant Governor Kerry Healey.

In May 2022, Rogers was appointed to the Board of Advisors at Talon Cyber Security.

== Military decorations ==
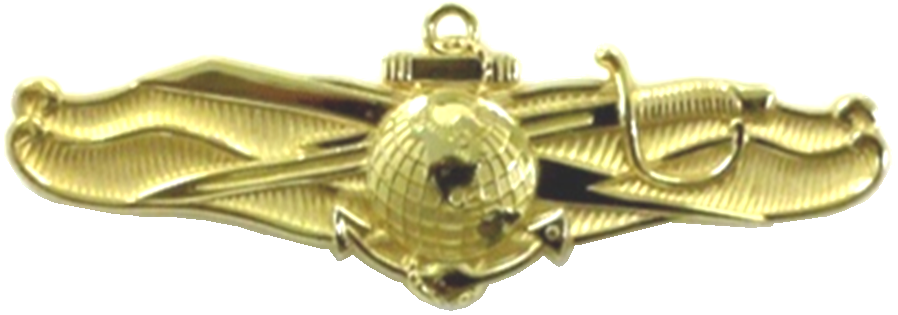
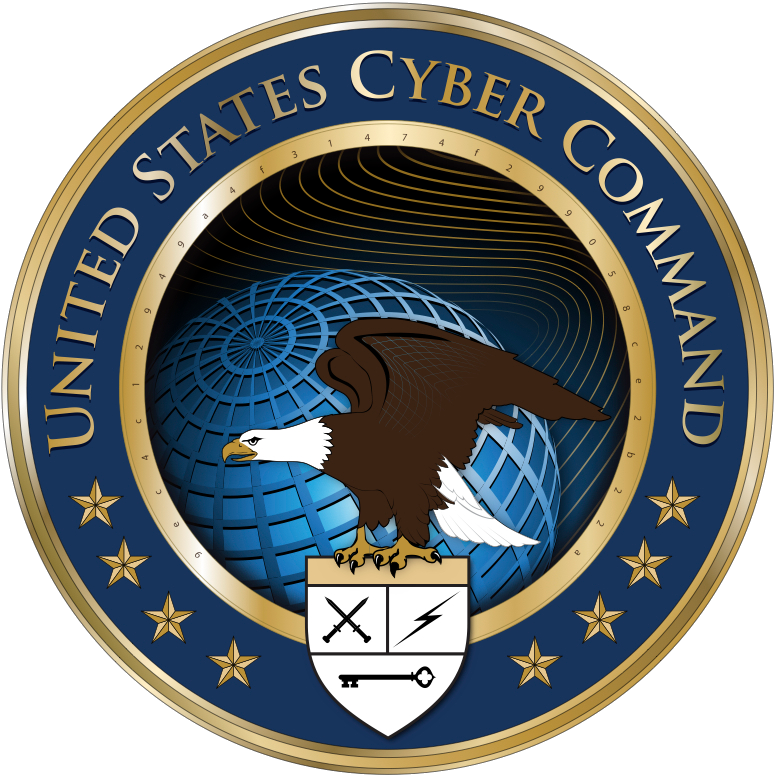
Navy Information Dominance Warfare Officer Pin
Navy Surface Warfare Officer Pin
United States Cyber Command Badge
National Security Agency Badge

Navy Distinguished Service Medal
Defense Superior Service Medal with two bronze oak leaf clusters
Meritorious Service Medal with two gold award stars
Joint Service Commendation Medal
Navy Commendation Medal with silver award star
Joint Meritorious Unit Award with three oak leaf clusters
Navy Unit Commendation
Navy Meritorious Unit Commendation with two bronze service stars
National Intelligence Distinguished Public Service Medal
Navy "E" Ribbon
Navy Expeditionary Medal with three service stars
National Defense Service Medal with service star
Armed Forces Expeditionary Medal with service star
Global War on Terrorism Expeditionary Medal
Global War on Terrorism Service Medal
Military Outstanding Volunteer Service Medal
Navy Sea Service Deployment Ribbon with 2 service stars
Navy & Marine Corps Overseas Service Ribbon with 4 service stars
Honorary Officer of the Order of Australia (military version), 17 September 2018
Navy Rifle Marksmanship Ribbon
Navy Expert Pistol Shot Medal

Government offices
Preceded by Keith Alexander	NSA Director; 2014–2018	Succeeded by Paul M. Nakasone
Military offices
Preceded by Michael Flynn	Director of Intelligence of the Joint Staff; 2009–2011	Succeeded by Elizabeth L. Train
Preceded by Bernard J. McCullough, III	Commander of United States Tenth Fleet/Fleet Cyber Command; 2011–2014	Succeeded by Jan E. Tighe
Preceded by Keith Alexander	Commander of the United States Cyber Command; 2014–2018	Succeeded by Paul M. Nakasone
