= Timothy J. White =

Fleet Cyber Command commander

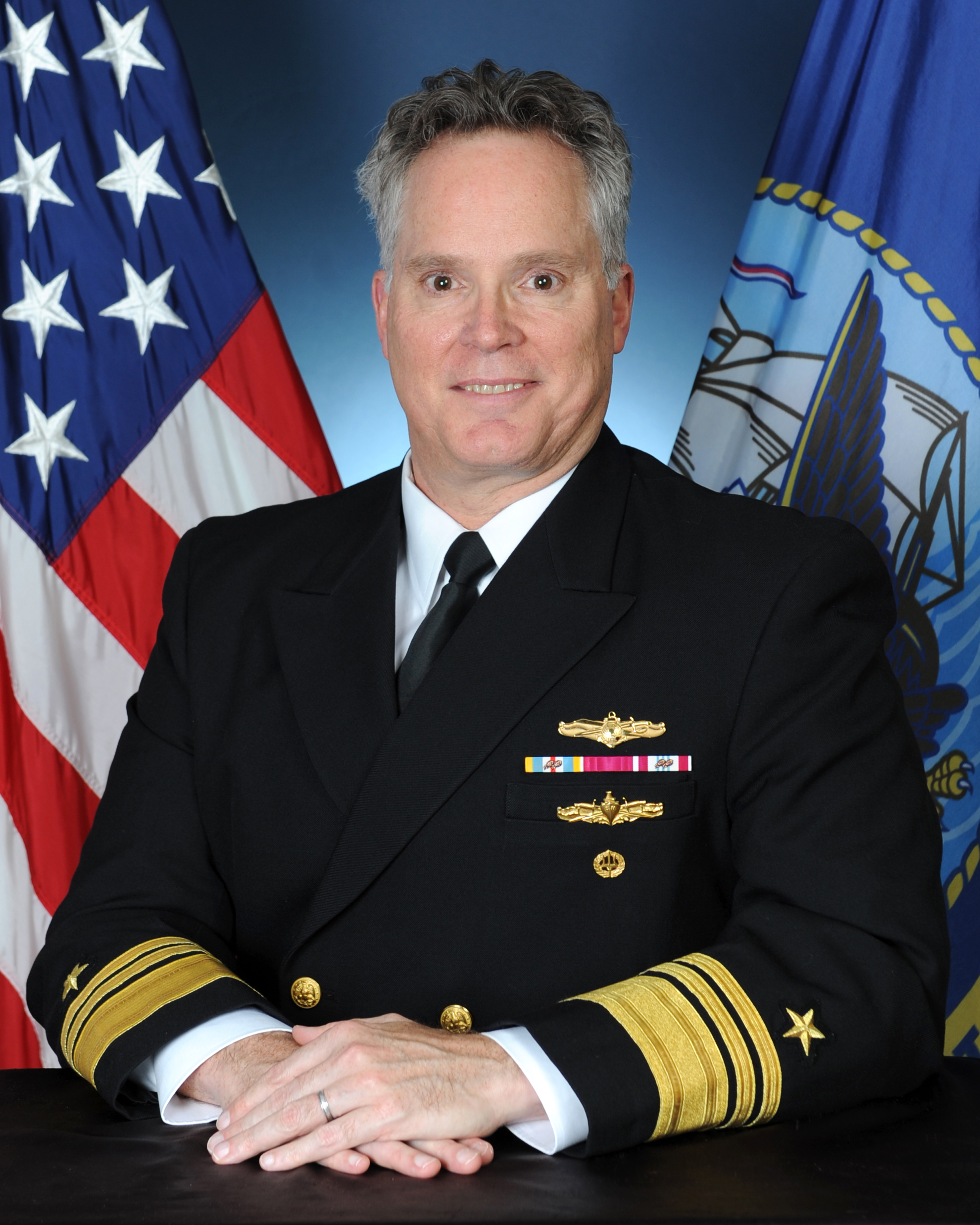
- Military career
- Allegiance: United States
- Branch: United States Navy
- Service years: 1987–2020
- Rank: Vice admiral
- Commands: United States Fleet Cyber Command; United States Tenth Fleet; Cyber National Mission Force; Navy Space Command
- Conflicts: Gulf War
- Awards: Defense Superior Service Medal (3); Legion of Merit

Timothy J. "TJ" White is a United States Navy vice admiral who served as commander of the United States Fleet Cyber Command and United States Tenth Fleet from 2018 to 2020.

In 2025 White was named the Chief of Texas Cyber Command by Governor Greg Abbott.

Military offices
Preceded by ???	Deputy Director for Tailored Access Operations of the National Security Agency; 201?-201?	Succeeded by Curt Copley
Preceded by ???	Director of Intelligence of the United States Pacific Command; 201?–2016	Succeeded by Jeffrey A. Kruse
Preceded by Paul M. Nakasone	Commander of the Cyber National Mission Force; 2016–2018	Succeeded by Timothy D. Haugh
Preceded by Michael M. Gilday	Commander of the U.S. Fleet Cyber Command, Navy Space Command, and the Tenth Fleet; 2018–2020	Succeeded by Ross A. Myers
