= U.S. Fleet Cyber Command =

Cyberwarfare command and operating force of the U.S. Navy

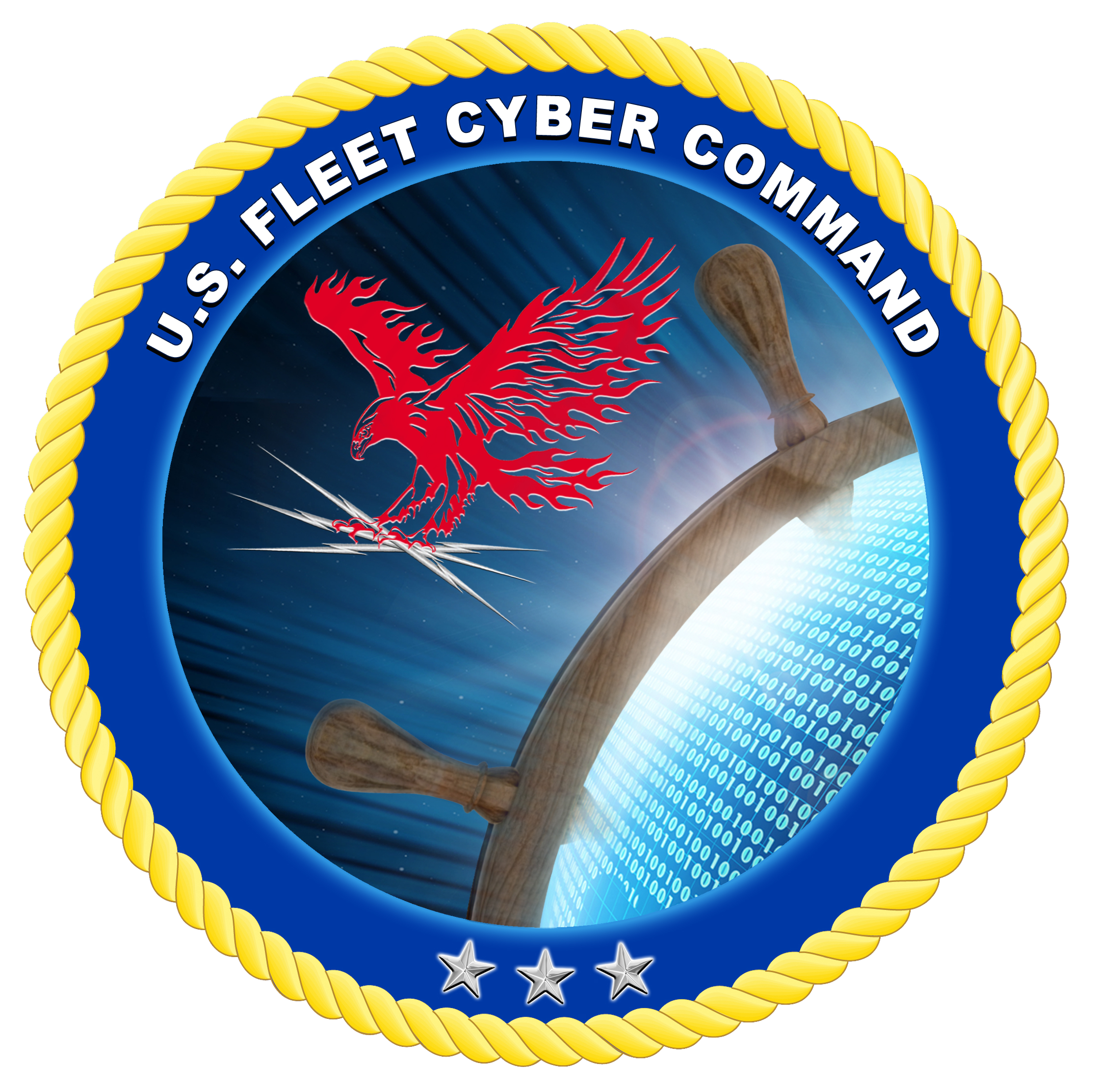
- Emblem of FLTCYBER
- Active: 29 January 2010; 16 years ago
- Country: United States
- Branch: United States Navy
- Type: Naval operating force
- Role: Cyber operations
- Part of: U.S. Space Command; U.S. Cyber Command
- Garrison/HQ: Fort Meade, Maryland, U.S.
- Website: fcc.navy.mil

Commanders
- Commander: VADM Heidi K. Berg
- Deputy Commander: RDML Kurtis A. Mole
- Deputy Commander (10F): RDML Ryan K. Mahelona
- Chief of Staff (FLTCYBER and 10F): CAPT Pete M. Koprowski
- Senior Enlisted Leader: CMDCM Brian R. Happli

Insignia
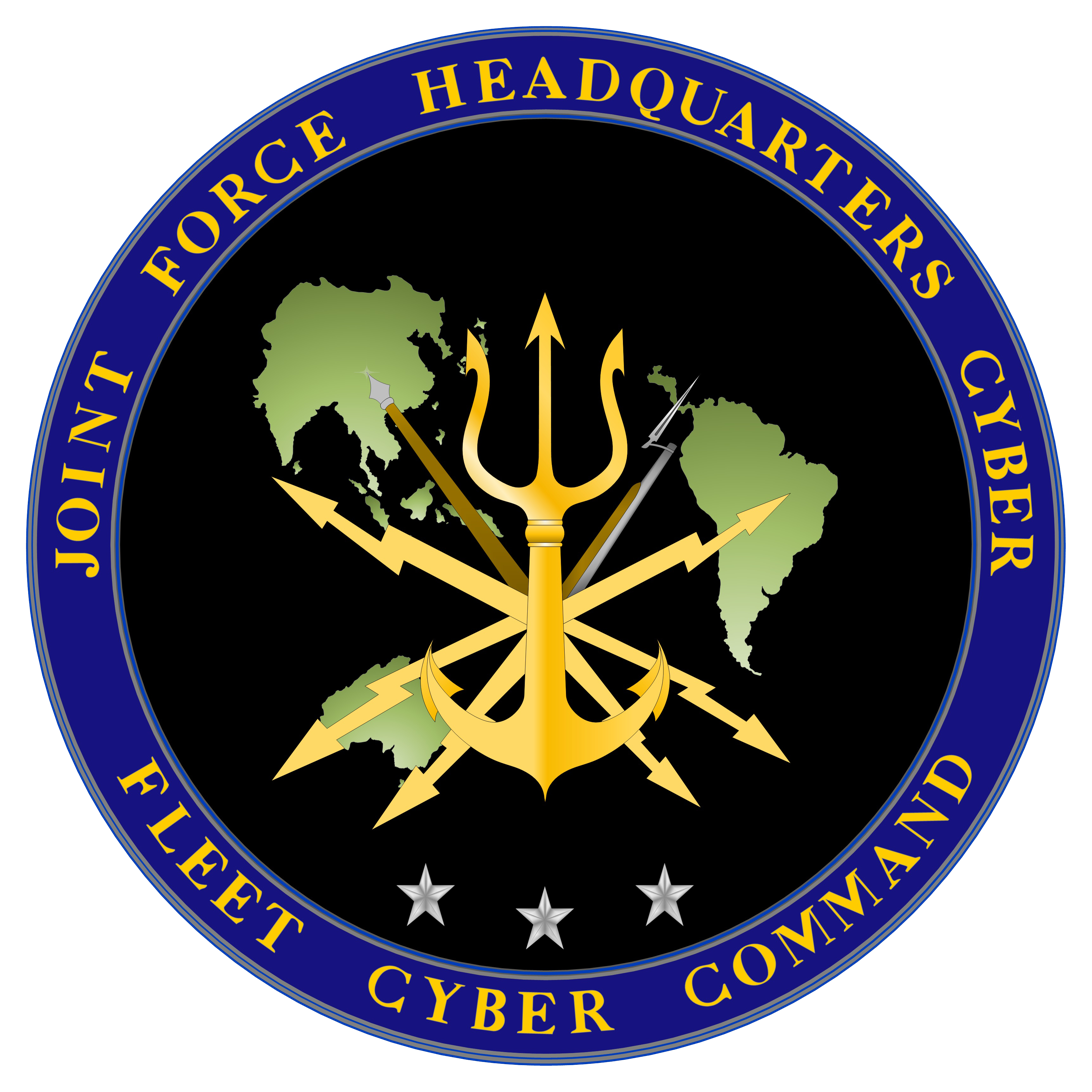
- Seal of Joint Force Headquarters - Cyber (Navy) (JFHQ-C (Navy))

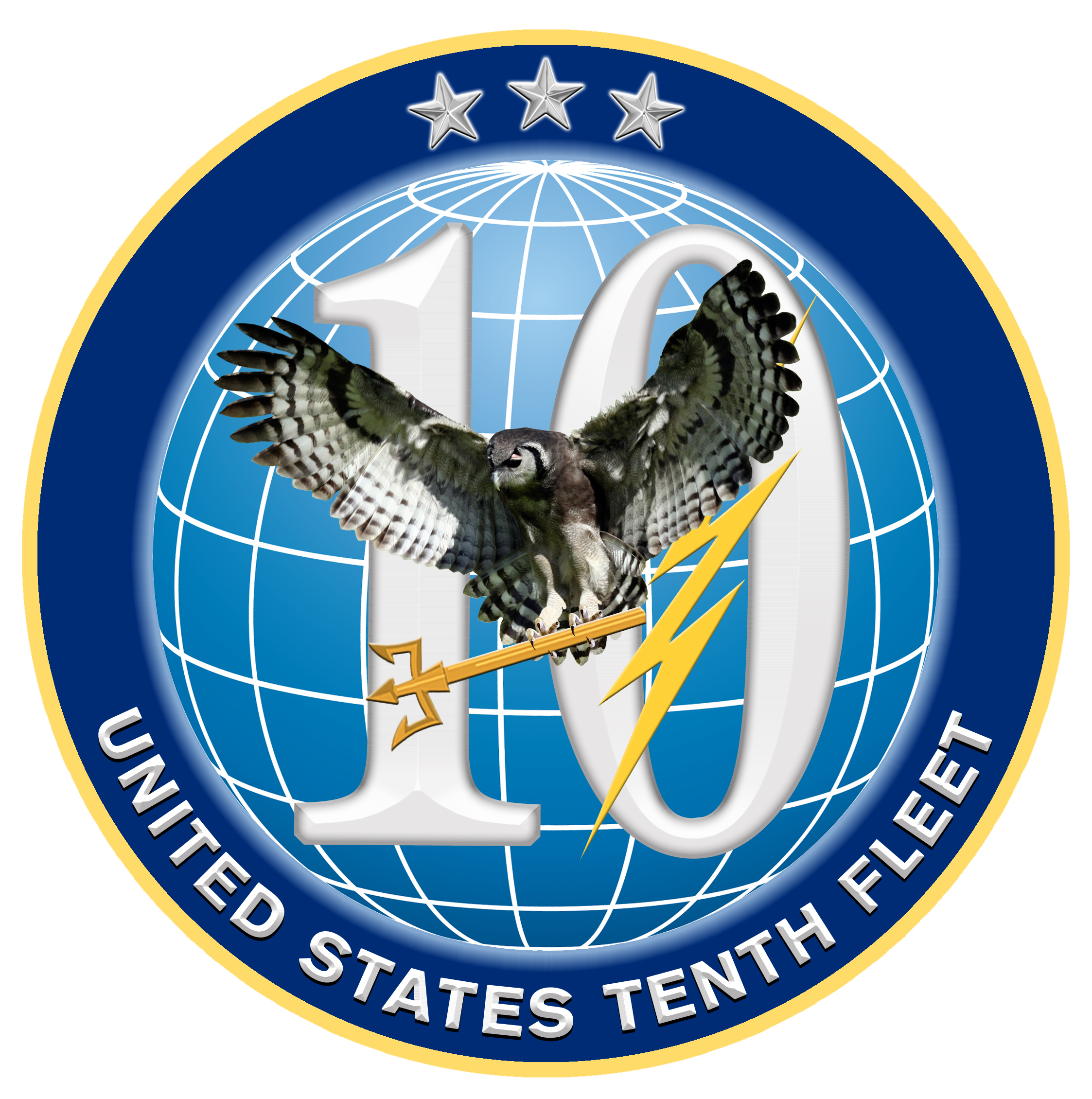
- Seal of U.S. Tenth Fleet

U.S. Fleet Cyber Command (FLTCYBER) is an operating force of the United States Navy responsible for the Navy's information network operations, offensive and defensive cyber operations, space operations and signals intelligence. It was created in January 2010 "to deter and defeat aggression and to ensure freedom of action to achieve military objectives in and through cyberspace". The U.S. Tenth Fleet (C10F) was simultaneously reactivated as its force provider. Since it was founded, the command has grown into an operational force composed of more than 16,000 active and reserve sailors and civilians organized into 27 active commands, 40 Cyber Mission Force units, and 27 reserve commands around the world.

== Organization ==
FLTCYBER serves as the Navy's Service Cyber Component (SCC) to United States Cyber Command (USCYBERCOM) and the Navy's Service Cryptologic Component to the National Security Agency/Central Security Service. FLTCYBER also reports directly to the chief of naval operations as an Echelon II command and is responsible for Navy information network operations, offensive and defensive cyberspace operations, space operations and signals intelligence.

Headquartered at Fort Meade, Maryland, FLTCYBER exercises operational control of globally-deployed Cyber Mission Forces (CMF) through a task force structure aligned to C10F. FLTCYBER is also designated as the JFHQ-C element supporting U.S. Indo-Pacific Command (USINDOPACOM), U.S. Southern Command (USSOUTHCOM), and U.S. Forces Korea (USFK) for the development, oversight, planning and execution of full spectrum cyber operations aligned with other traditional warfighting lines of operation.

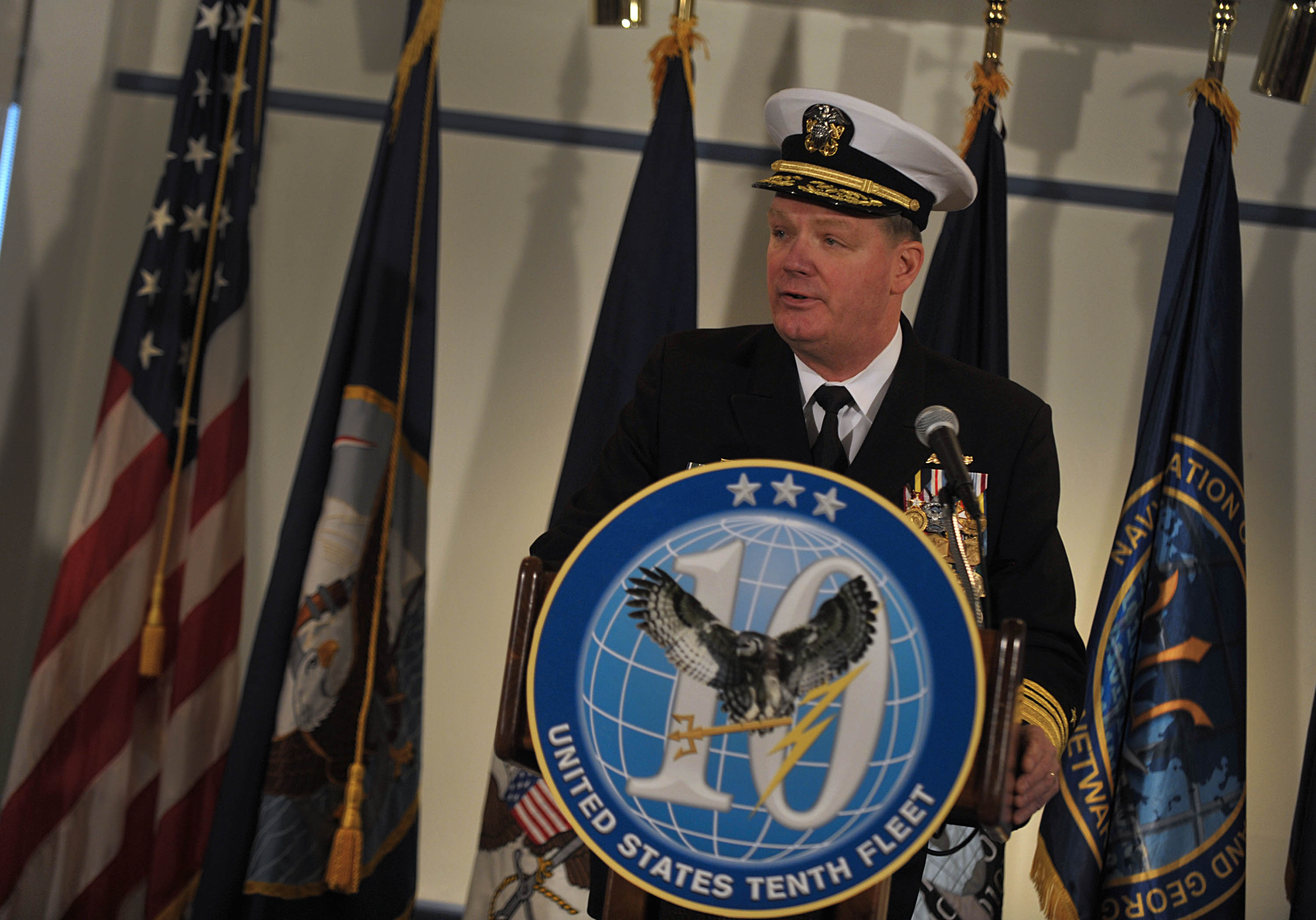
Vice Adm. Barry McCullough, first commander of FLTCYBER

== History ==
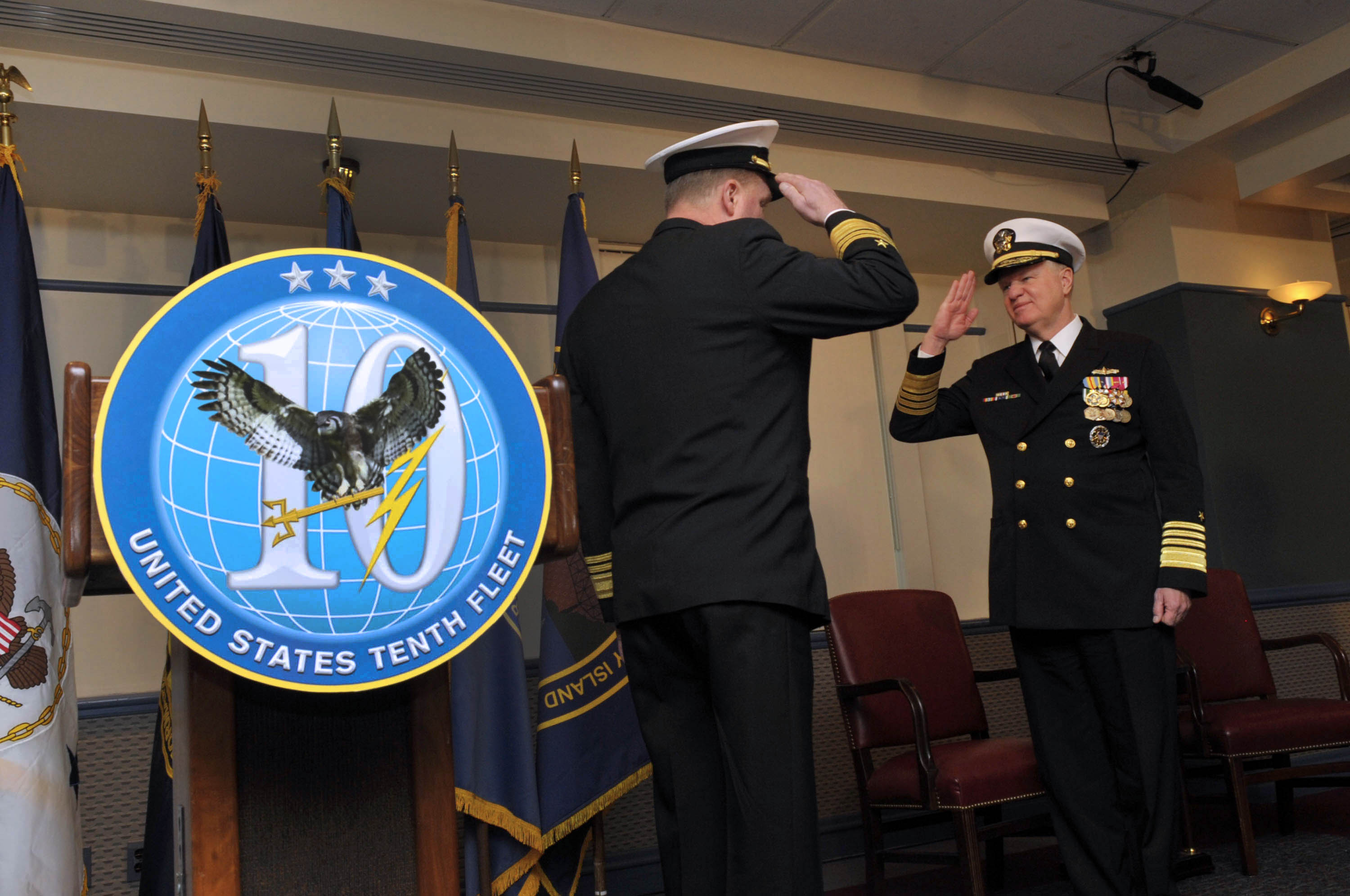
Commissioning ceremony for Vice Adm. Barry McCullough as commander of FLTCYBER and U.S. Tenth Fleet.

FLTCYBER's roots are in the namesake of its force provider, C10F, which was organized in 1943 to coordinate the allied response to the German U-boat threat and ensure access to the shipping lanes of the Atlantic.

Today, FLTCYBER and the modern U.S. Tenth Fleet ensure the Navy and the Nation have access to systems in the cyber domain.

=== The creation of USCYBERCOM and FLTCYBER ===
Department of Defense cyber operations came together under a single organization on 1 October 2000, when United States Space Command (USSPACECOM) formally took control of the Department of Defense computer network attack activities from the Joint Staff. USSPACECOM was eventually dissolved and some its functions merged into the reorganized United States Strategic Command (USSTRATCOM) 1 October 2002.

Navy Cyber operations were originally the responsibility of Naval Computer and Telecommunications Command, Naval Security Group and Naval Space Command, which were combined with 20 other commands into the Naval Network Warfare Command (NETWARCOM) in 2002 to unify network operations, offensive and defensive cyberspace operations, space operations and cryptologic/signals intelligences.

In 2005, with the alignment of Naval Security Group, NETWARCOM brought the former Naval Security Group Activities (NSGAs) under its umbrella and the mission of the command fundamentally changed, making it the Navy's lead command for information operations, networks and space.

After extensive study, Secretary of Defense Robert Gates directed the creation of a new sub-unified command, USCYBERCOM on 12 November 2008, to operate under the authority of USSTRATCOM.

FLTCYBER was officially created as the Navy SCC to USCYBERCOM on 29 January 2010. Chief of Naval Operations Admiral Gary Roughead named VADM Bernard J. McCullough III as the commander of both FLTCYBER and C10F, and all subsequent commanders have led FLTCYBER and C10F simultaneously.

In August 2017, President Donald J. Trump announced the elevation of USCYBERCOM from a sub-unified command under USSTRATCOM to a Unified Combatant Command responsible for cyberspace operations. FLTCYBER remains the Navy SCC to USCYBERCOM.

In April 2019, Navy Space Command (NAVSPACECOM) was established as the service component of the USSPACECOM, while being commanded by the head of FLTCYBER. Since 2019 the Commander, FLTCYBER, has also simultaneously been Commander, NAVSPACECOM, though the latter post was not formally established until January 2023.

== List of Commanders ==
No.	Commanders		Term		
No.	Portrait	Name	Took office	Left office	Term length
1	Bernard J. McCullough III	Vice Admiral; Bernard J. McCullough III	December 2009	1 October 2011	~1 year and 10 months
2	Michael S. Rogers	Vice Admiral; Michael S. Rogers	1 October 2011	3 March 2014	2 years, 153 days
3	Jan E. Tighe	Vice Admiral; Jan E. Tighe	2 April 2014	14 July 2016	2 years, 103 days
4	Michael M. Gilday	Vice Admiral; Michael M. Gilday	14 July 2016	18 June 2018	1 year, 339 days
5	Timothy J. White	Vice Admiral; Timothy J. White	18 June 2018	18 September 2020	2 years, 92 days
6	Ross A. Myers	Vice Admiral; Ross A. Myers	18 September 2020	4 August 2022	1 year, 337 days
7	Craig A. Clapperton	Vice Admiral; Craig A. Clapperton	4 August 2022	10 October 2025	3 years, 67 days
8	Heidi K. Berg	Vice Admiral; Heidi K. Berg	10 October 2025	Incumbent	341 days

== See also ==
- USCYBERCOM
- Navy Information Forces
- U.S. Navy Information Warfare Community
