= United States Tenth Fleet =

U.S. Navy numbered fleet

U.S. Tenth Fleet
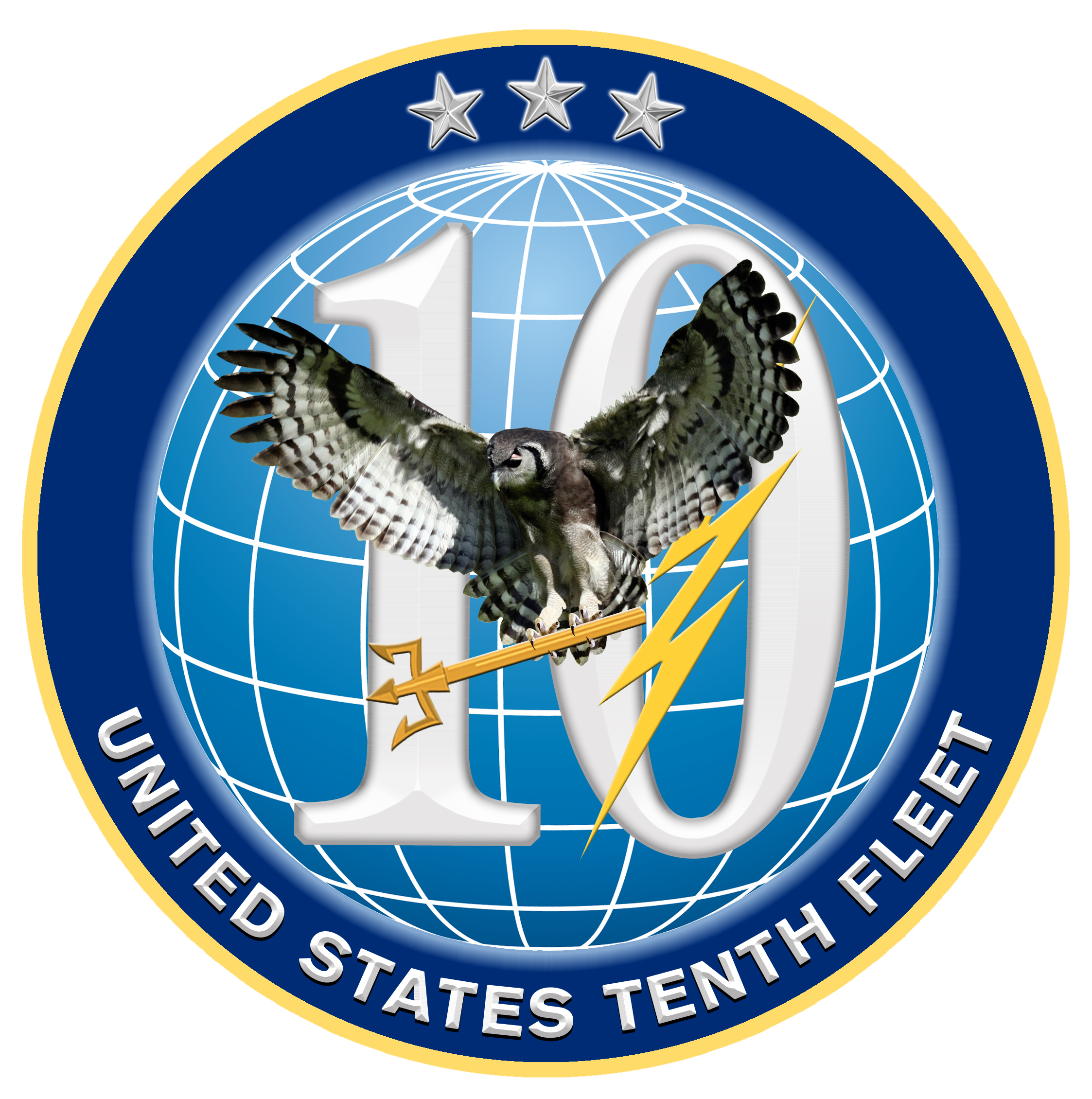
- Tenth Fleet emblem
- Active: 19 February 1943 – June 1945; 29 January 2010 – present
- Country: United States
- Branch: United States Navy
- Type: Fleet
- Role: Cyber operations
- Part of: U.S. Fleet Cyber Command
- Garrison/HQ: Fort Meade, Maryland, U.S.
- Nickname: "TENTHFLT"

Commanders
- Current commander: Vice Admiral Heidi Berg

The U.S. Tenth Fleet is a functional formation and a numbered fleet in the United States Navy. It was first created as a global anti-submarine warfare coordinating organization under the singular authority of the Commander in Chief, U.S. Fleet (COMINCH), Admiral Ernest J. King, during the Second World War. It was focused upon the destruction of enemy submarines and blockade runners globally, although primarily in the Atlantic and Indian Oceans. Tenth Fleet provided the targeting data required for anti-submarine operations in the Pacific and Arctic Seas as well. King specifically dissolved the Tenth Fleet upon the cessation of hostilities in 1945.

It was reactivated as a force provider for Fleet Cyber Command on 29 January 2010. U.S. Tenth Fleet serves as the numbered fleet for U.S. Fleet Cyber Command and exercises operational control of assigned naval forces to coordinate with other naval, coalition and Joint Task Forces to execute the full spectrum of cyber, electronic warfare, information operations, and signal intelligence capabilities and missions across the cyber, electromagnetic, and space domains.

== Mission statement ==
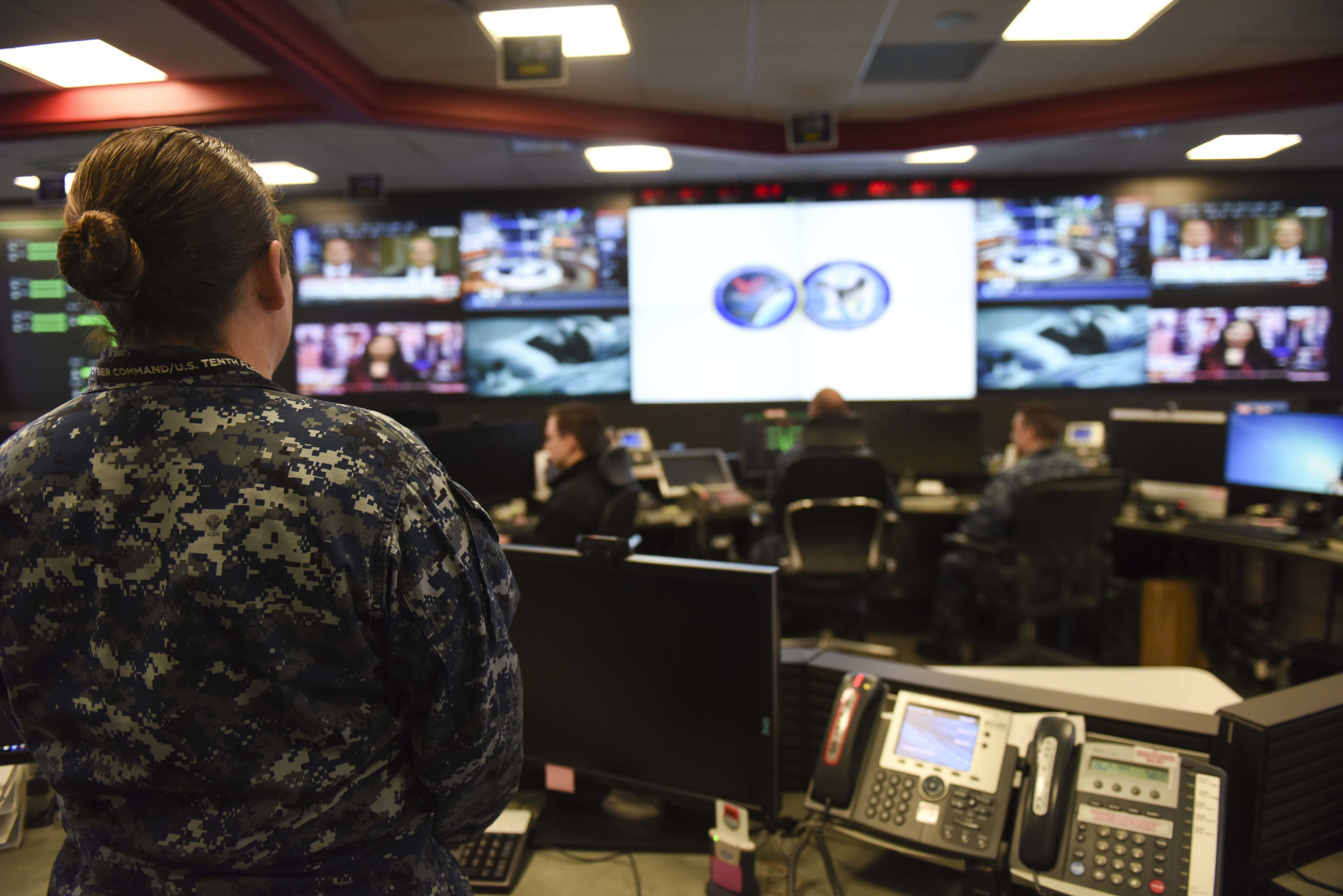
U.S. Navy sailors stand watch at 10th Fleet/Fleet Cyber Command

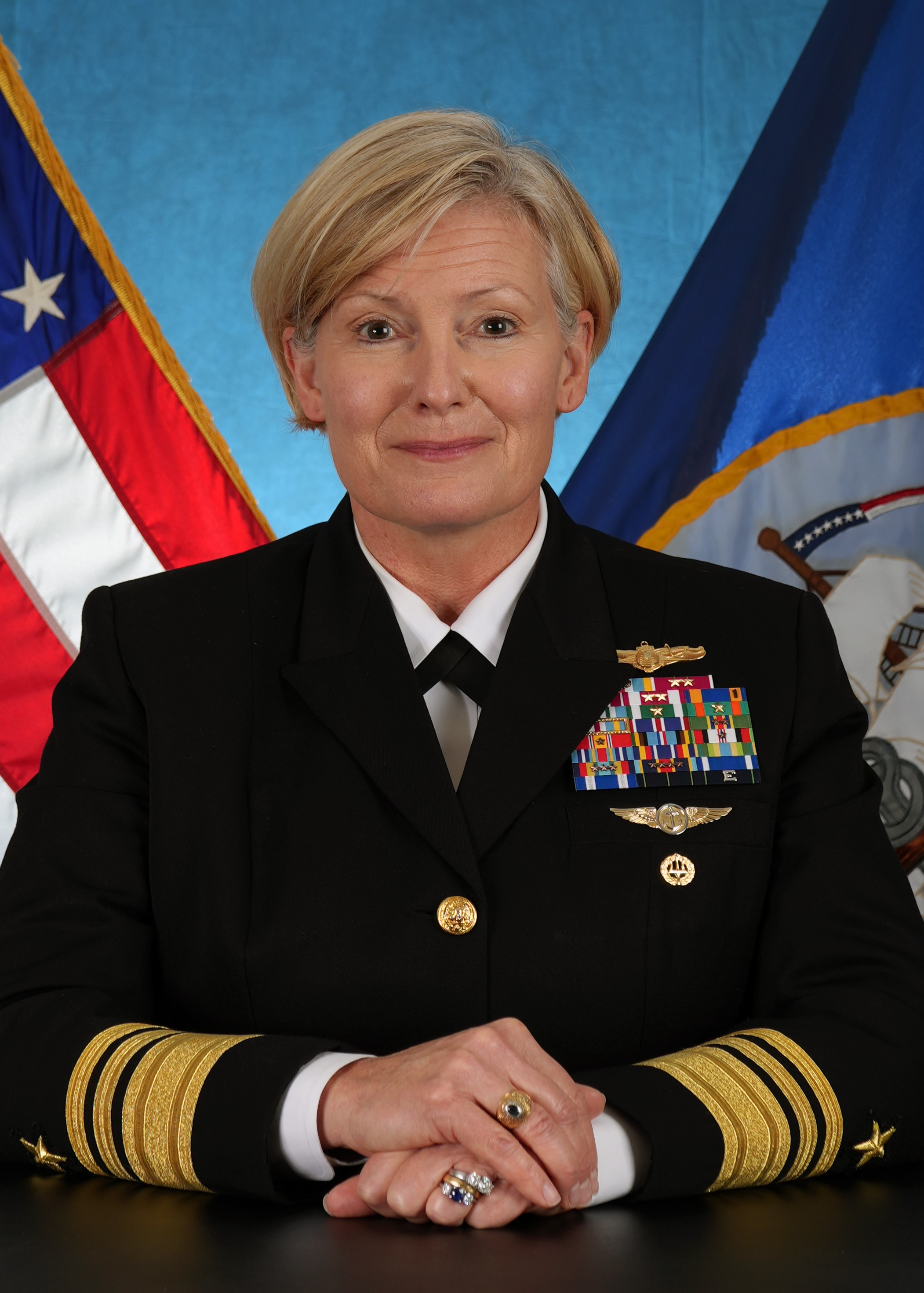
Vice Adm. Heidi Berg, Commander, U.S. Fleet Cyber Command / Navy Space Command / Joint Force Headquarters-Cyber (Navy) / U.S. TENTH Fleet.

The mission of Tenth Fleet is to plan, monitor, direct, assess, communicate, coordinate, and execute operations to enable command and control and set the conditions for subordinate success by:

- Serving as the numbered fleet for U.S. Fleet Cyber Command and exercise operational control over U.S. Fleet Cyber Command-assigned forces.
- Directing and delivering desired tactical and operational effects in and through cyberspace, space and the electromagnetic spectrum to Navy commanders worldwide and ensure successful execution of U.S. Fleet Cyber Command-assigned mission areas.

== Fleet organization ==
U.S. Tenth Fleet has operational control over Navy information, computer, cryptologic, and space forces. U.S. Tenth Fleet standing forces are organized into Task forces and task groups. U.S. Navy usage routinely emphasizes the Commander of the Task Force, thus CTF (and CTG) rather than TF.

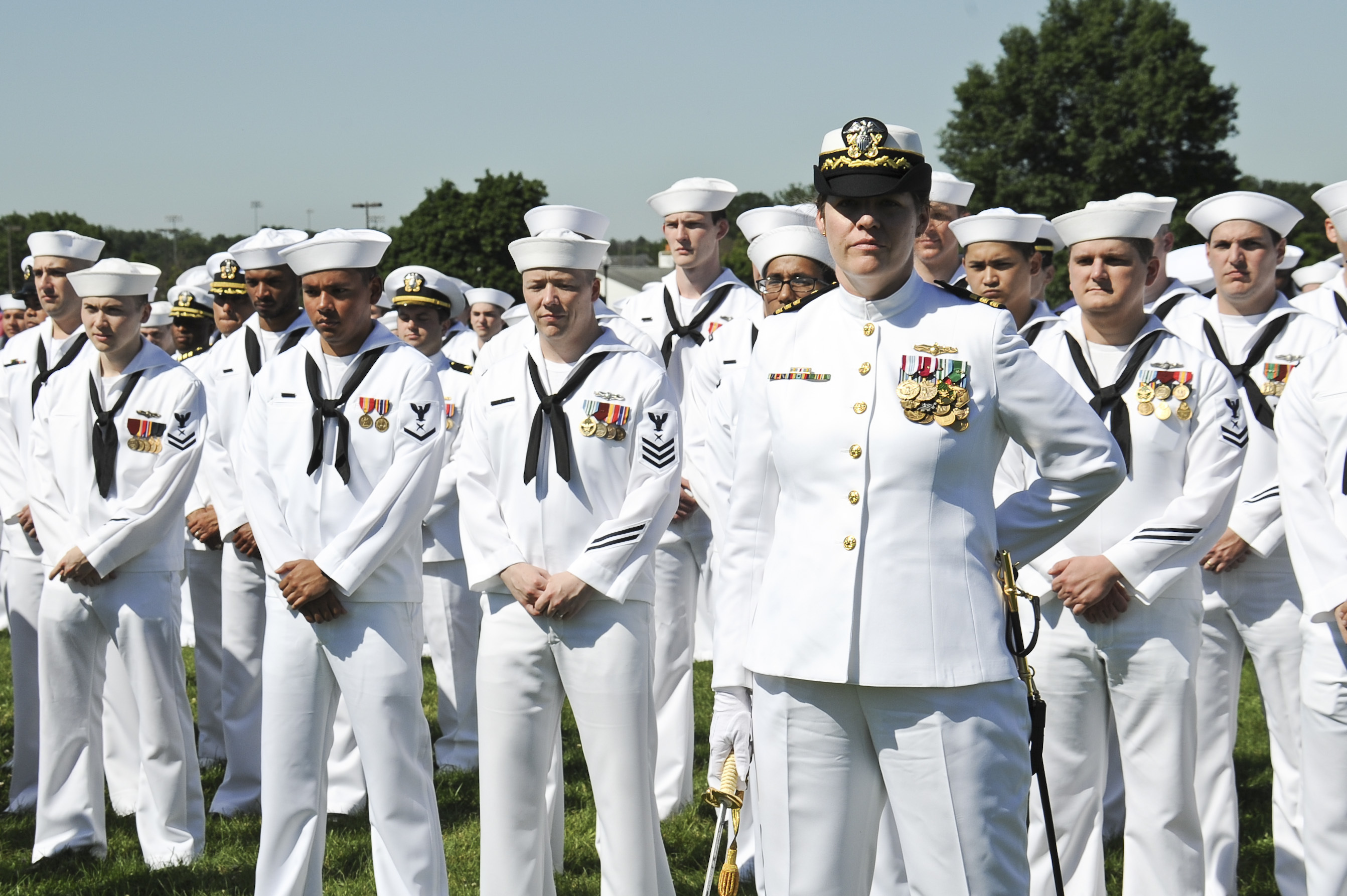
Change of Command for Cryptologic Warfare Group-6 formerly Navy Information Operations Command Maryland, U.S. TENTH Fleet/FCC

=== Fleet Operational Support Forces ===
- Commander Task Group (CTG):
  - CTG 101 – Navy Information Operations Command (NIOC) Colorado
  - CTG 102 – Navy Information Operations Command (NIOC) Whidbey Island
  - CTG 103 – Navy Information Operations Command (NIOC) Pensacola

=== Network operations and defense ===
- CTF 1010 – Naval Network Warfare Command (NNWC), "NETWARCOM"
  - CTG 1010.1 – NCTAMS LANT
  - CTG 1010.2 – NCTAMS PAC
  - CTG 1010.5 – NCTS Bahrain
  - CTG 1010.6 – NCTS Naples
- CTF 1020 – CO NCDOC
  - CTG 1020.1 – NCDOC

=== Information operations ===
- CTF 1030 – CO NIOC Norfolk
  - CTG 1030.1 – NIOC Norfolk
  - CTG 1030.2 – NIOC San Diego
  - CTG 1030.3 – NIOC Whidbey Island

NIOC Norfolk and NIOC San Diego disbanded and are now Naval Information Warfare Training Group (Norfolk / San Diego)

=== Research and development ===
- CTF 1090 – CO NCWDG

=== Service cryptologic component operations ===
- CTF 1000 – C10F
  - CTG 1000.1 – NIOC Menwith Hill Station
  - CTG 1000.2 – NIOC Sugar Grove
  - CTG 1000.3 – NIOC Misawa
  - CTG 1000.4 – NIOC Texas
  - CTG 1000.5 – NIOC Georgia
  - CTG 1000.6 – CWG-6 (formerly NIOC Maryland)
  - CTG 1000.7 – NIOC Hawaii
  - CTG 1000.8 – NIOC Colorado
  - CTG 1000.9 – NIOD Yakima
  - CTG 1000.10 – NIOD Alice Springs

=== Fleet and theater operations ===
- CTF 1040 – CO NIOC Texas
  - CTG 1040.1 – NIOC Texas
- CTF 1050 – CO NIOC Georgia
  - CTG 1050.1 – NIOC Georgia
- CTF 1060 – CO CWG-6
  - CTG 1060.1 – CWMA-61
  - CTG 1060.2 – FIOC UK
- CTF 1070 – CO NIOC Hawaii
  - CTG 1070.1 – NIOC Hawaii
  - CTG 1070.2 – NIOC Yokosuka
  - CTG 1070.3 – NIOC Misawa
- CTF 1080 – CO NIOC Colorado
  - CTG 1080.1 – NIOC Colorado

For a period from 2010 U.S. Tenth Fleet's task forces used the Task Force 100 – Task Force 109 designation series.

== History ==
=== World War II: Anti-submarine warfare ===
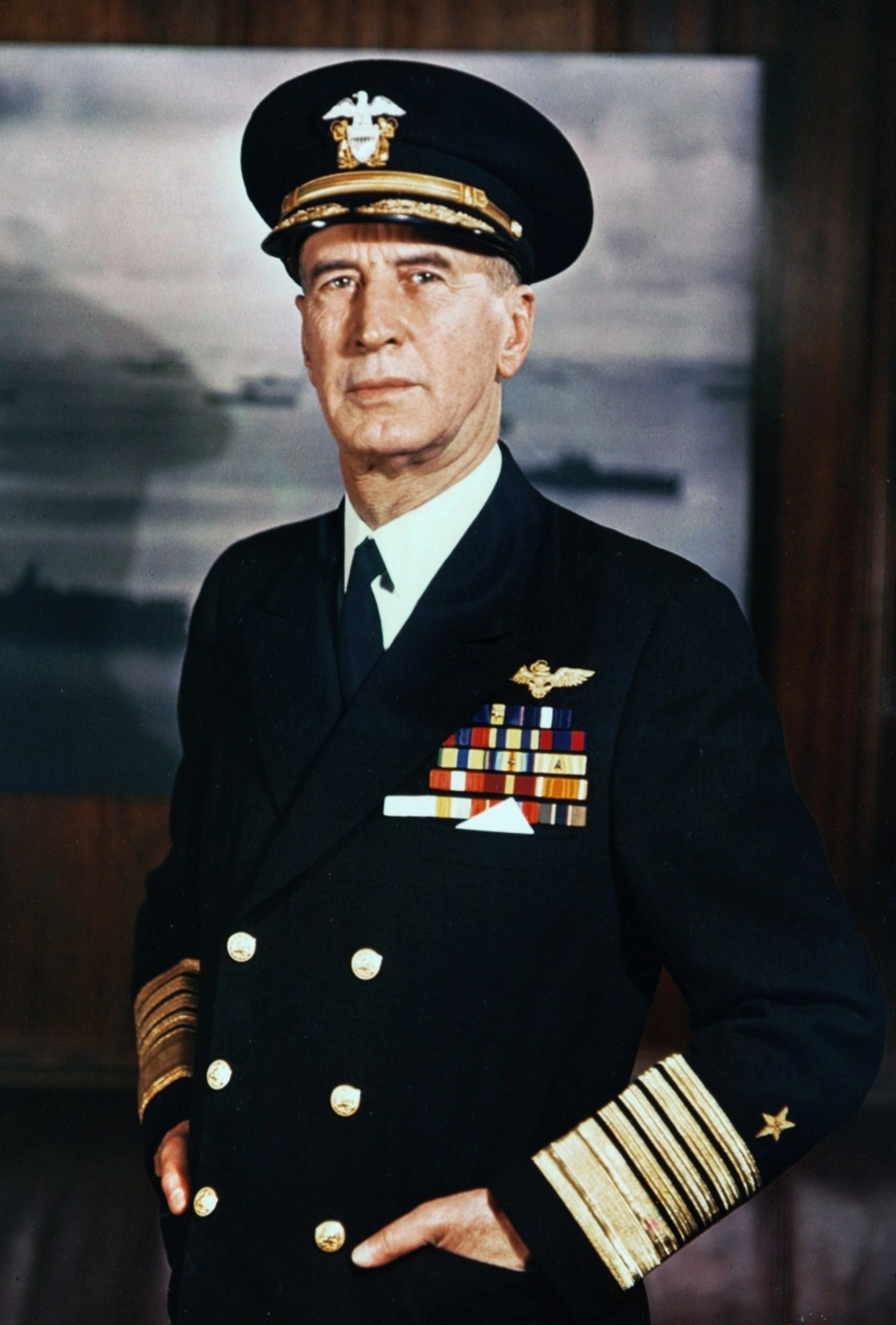
Fleet Admiral Ernest King

As soon as the United States officially declared war on Nazi Germany in late 1941, an urgent need developed to consolidate and coordinate anti-submarine operations. Although Allied ship traffic had been subject to German U-boat attacks since the hostilities in Europe began, Germany began aggressively attacking American targets after the U.S. officially entered the war. U.S. Tenth Fleet was established on 20 May 1943 based on a recommendations Fleet Admiral Ernest King made to the Joint Chiefs of Staff in a memo entitled "Anti-submarine Operations." The memo proposed a central organization with access to all intelligence about German U-boats and the authority to direct Navy ships to prosecute them. Tenth Fleet became a clearing house for everything involving anti-submarine warfare (ASW) and had unrestricted access to the Admiralty's U-boat tracking room and its various ASW research and intelligence agencies. All Allied countries coordinated ASW activities through U.S. Tenth Fleet.

In addition to the coordination and supervision of all anti-submarine warfare training, anti-submarine intelligence, and coordination with the allied nations, U.S. Tenth Fleet's mission included the destruction of enemy submarines, the protection of coastal merchant shipping, and the centralization of control and routing of convoys. U.S. Tenth Fleet was composed of five primary sections: Operations, Anti-submarine Measures, Convoy and Routing, the Civilian Scientific Council, and the Air Anti-submarine Development Unit.

Commander in Chief and Chief of Naval Operations Admiral Ernest King was the fleet's commander, with Rear Admiral Francis S. Low, King's assistant chief of staff for ASW, as fleet chief of staff. Admiral Low was later relieved by Rear Admiral Allan Rockwell McCann, who remained in command of U.S. Tenth Fleet until it was deactivated. U.S. Tenth Fleet never put to sea, had no ships, and never had more than about 50 people in its organization. The fleet was disbanded June 1945. after the surrender of Germany.

Operations

The Operations section headed by Captain Haines, was formed from the original Atlantic section of the Commander in Chief's Combat Intelligence Division, led by Commander Kenneth Knowles, whose intelligence was instrumental in U.S. Tenth Fleet's prosecution of the U-Boat threat. This section utilized information from all the other sections combined with all source intelligence to guide the operations of so-called "hunter-killer groups" tasked with finding and destroying German U-Boats. Sources included intercepted German communications provided by OP-20-G, the precursor organization to Naval Security Group, and interrogations of captured U-Boat crews provided by OP- 16-Z, Naval Intelligence's Special Activities Branch.

Anti-submarine Measures

The Anti-submarine Measures section, led by Captain Fitz, was divided into Air and Surface sections. This branch was responsible for the correlation of ASW research, materiel development, and training. In June of 1943, they began publishing a monthly U.S. Fleet Anti-submarine Bulletin, which came to be known as the "Yellow Peril". The Yellow Peril discussed the latest in ASW training, new technological developments, dissected previous months U-Boat battles, among other bits of data. Each issue exceeded fifty pages. Due to its comprehensiveness and reliability, demand for the Yellow Peril was extremely high, even among the Allies.

Convoy and Routine

The Convoy and Routing section, chaired by Rear Admiral Martin Metcalf, was responsible for tracking the U.S. portion of convoys and planning routes they would take across the Atlantic. Known as C&R, its WAVES maintained massive wall charts detailing all ongoing convoy operations in the Atlantic. Intelligence received by the Operations Branch, once sanitized, was also added to these charts.

While not the only organization in the war combating German U-boats, the efforts of U.S. Tenth Fleet certainly helped bring about the end of the U-boat threat. Prior to the establishment of U.S. Tenth Fleet, the Allies averaged barely more than four U-boats sunk per month. During the month U.S. Tenth Fleet was established, the Allies sank 41, and averaged more than 23 per month thereafter. Oberleutnant zur See Herbert A. Werner, a former U-boat commander and one of the few to survive the war, described it succinctly when he said, "The Allied counter-offensive permanently reversed the tide of battle. Almost overnight, the hunters had become the hunted, and through the rest of the war our boats were slaughtered at a fearful rate."

=== U.S. Fleet Cyber Command ===
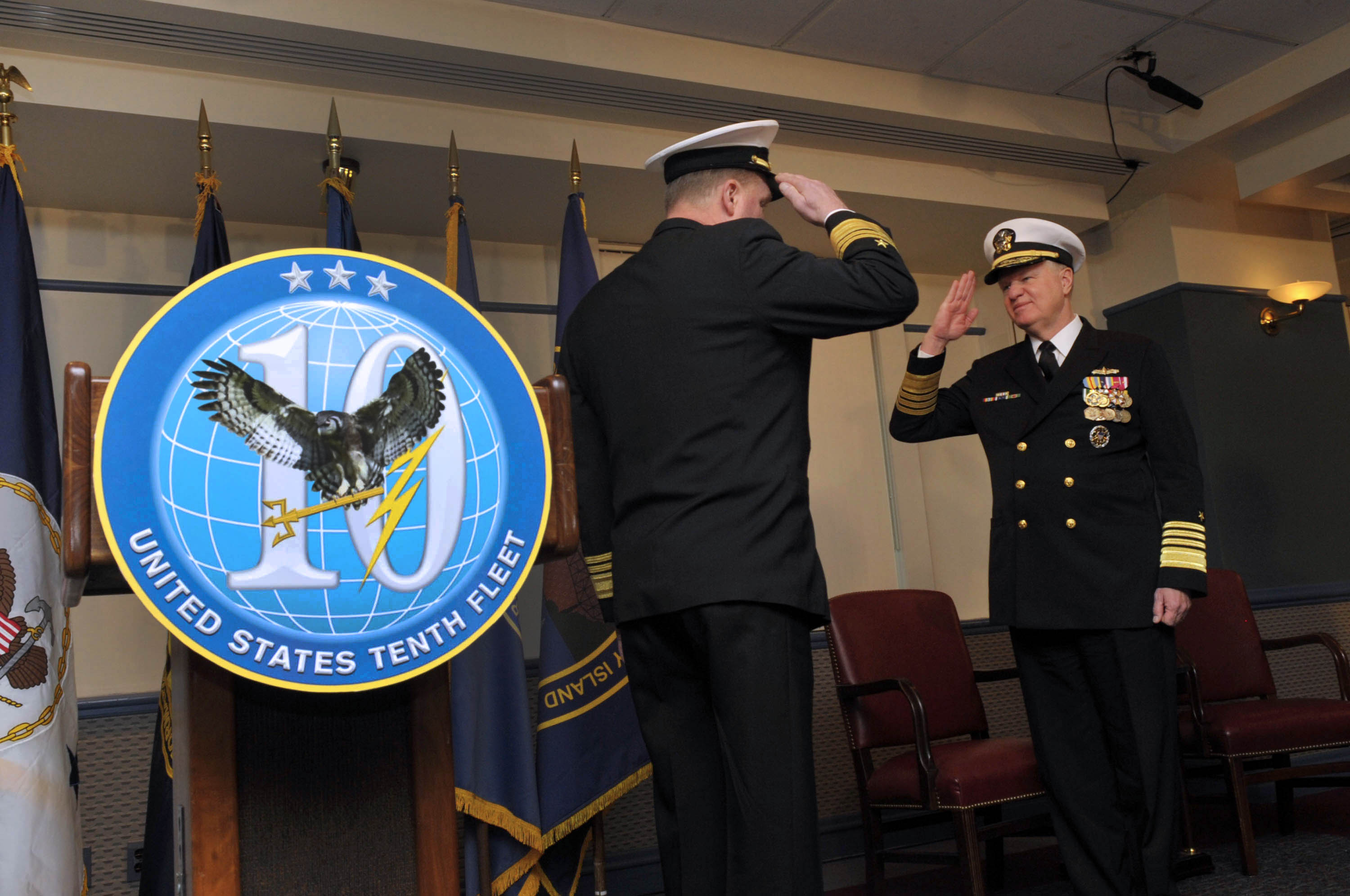
Chief of Naval Operations (CNO) Adm. Gary Roughead salutes Vice Adm. Barry McCullough, commander of U.S. Fleet Cyber Command and U.S. 10th Fleet at the commissioning ceremony for U.S. Fleet Cyber Command 29 Jan. 2010.

U.S. Tenth Fleet was recommissioned 29 January 2010 as the numbered fleet of U.S. Fleet Cyber Command with operational control over U.S. Fleet Cyber Command-assigned forces. Its first commander was Vice Admiral Bernard J. McCullough III. The fleet was re-established using existing Naval Network Warfare Command infrastructure, communications support and personnel at Fort Meade, Maryland. Much as U.S. Tenth Fleet was originally constituted to confront the U-boat threat and ensure access to the shipping lanes of the Atlantic, U.S. Fleet Cyber Command and the modern U.S. Tenth Fleet was created to manage threats in cyber space and ensure access to online traffic and commerce.

The need for a more coordinated approach to the cyber domain had been building for some time and culminated with the White House Cyberspace Policy Review of May 2009, which stated that "America's failure to protect cyberspace is one of the most urgent national security problems facing the new administration." Two months later, Secretary of Defense Gates unveiled his plan for military cyberspace operations. In a memo to the Secretaries of the Armed Forces, he wrote, "Our increasing dependency on cyberspace, alongside a growing array of cyber threats and vulnerabilities, adds a new element of risk to our national security. To address this risk effectively and to secure freedom of action in cyberspace, the Department of Defense requires a command that possesses the required technical capability and remains focused on the integration of cyberspace operations. Further, this command must be capable of synchronizing war-fighting effects across the global security environment as well as providing support to civil authorities and international partners."

In August, 2017, President Donald Trump announced that he would elevate U.S. Cyber Command, the parent command to U.S. Fleet Cyber Command to full combatant command status.

== List of Commanders ==
No.	Commanders		Term		
No.	Portrait	Name	Took office	Left office	Term length
1	Bernard J. McCullough III	Vice Admiral; Bernard J. McCullough III	December 2009	1 October 2011	~1 year and 10 months
2	Michael S. Rogers	Vice Admiral; Michael S. Rogers	1 October 2011	3 March 2014	2 years, 153 days
3	Jan E. Tighe	Vice Admiral; Jan E. Tighe	2 April 2014	14 July 2016	2 years, 103 days
4	Michael M. Gilday	Vice Admiral; Michael M. Gilday	14 July 2016	18 June 2018	1 year, 339 days
5	Timothy J. White	Vice Admiral; Timothy J. White	18 June 2018	18 September 2020	2 years, 92 days
6	Ross A. Myers	Vice Admiral; Ross A. Myers	18 September 2020	4 August 2022	1 year, 337 days
7	Craig A. Clapperton	Vice Admiral; Craig A. Clapperton	4 August 2022	10 October 2025	3 years, 67 days
8	Heidi Berg	Vice Admiral; Heidi Berg	10 October 2025	Incumbent	320 days

== See also ==
- List of cyber warfare forces
- Navy Information Forces
- U.S. Navy Information Dominance Corps
