= Admiral Symonds =

Admiral Symonds may refer to:

- James Symonds (born 1954), U.S. Navy rear admiral
- Thomas Symonds (Royal Navy officer, died 1894) (1811–1894), British Royal Navy admiral
- William Symonds (1782–1856), British Royal Navy rear admiral

== See also ==
- Richard Symonds-Tayler (1897–1971), British Royal Navy admiral
