= USS Ronald Reagan =

US Navy Nimitz-class aircraft carrier

USS Ronald Reagan (CVN-76)
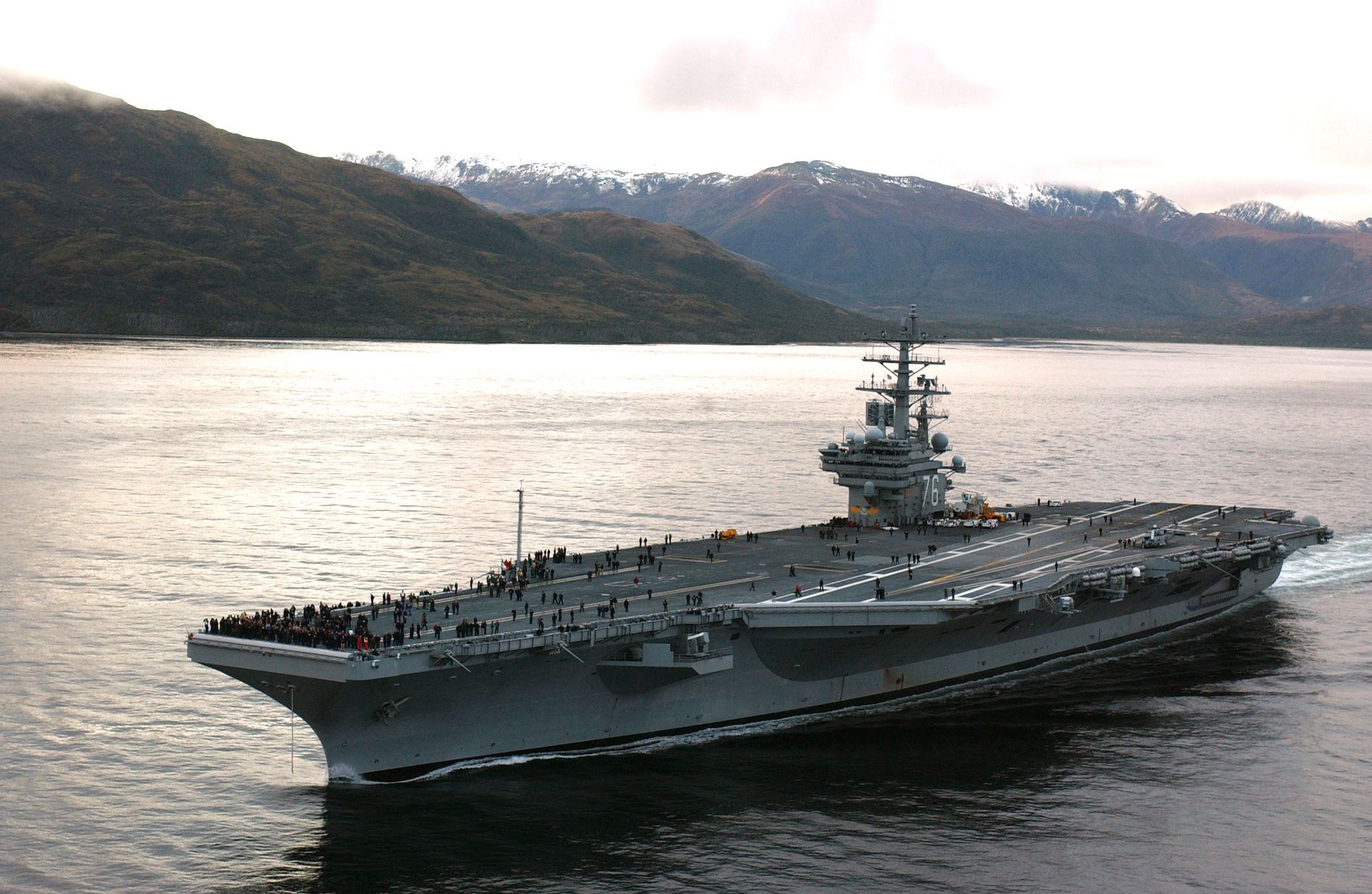
- USS Ronald Reagan in the Strait of Magellan in 2004

History

United States
- Name: Ronald Reagan
- Namesake: Ronald Reagan
- Ordered: 8 December 1994
- Builder: Northrop Grumman Newport News
- Laid down: 12 February 1998
- Launched: 4 March 2001
- Sponsored by: Nancy Reagan
- Christened: 4 March 2001
- Acquired: 20 June 2003
- Commissioned: 12 July 2003
- Home port: Kitsap, Washington
- Identification: MMSI number: 369970410; Callsign: NRGN; Hull number: CVN-76
- Motto: Peace Through Strength
- Nickname(s): Gipper
- Status: in active service
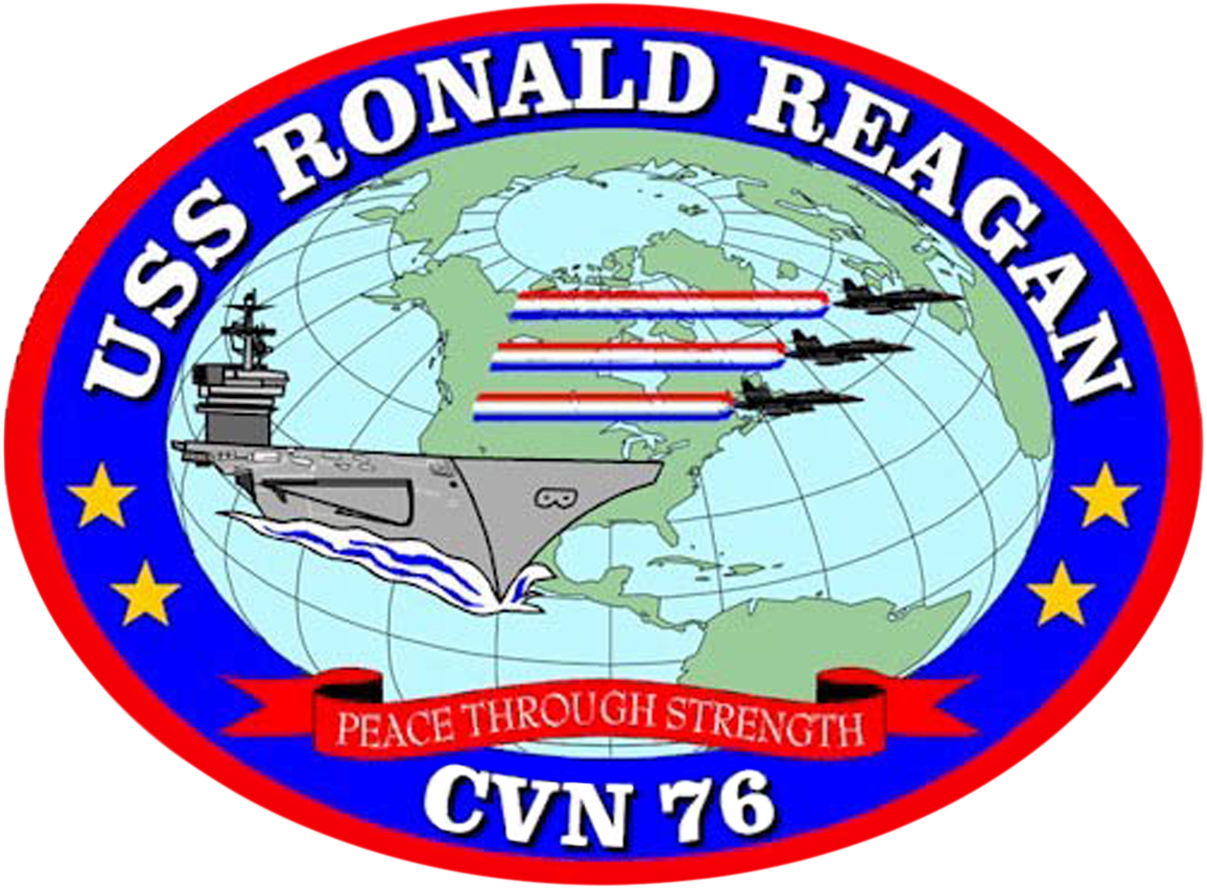
- Badge

General characteristics
- Class & type: Nimitz-class aircraft carrier; Ronald Reagan subclass
- Displacement: 101,400 long tons (113,600 short tons)
- Length: Overall: 1,092 ft (332.8 m); Waterline: 1,040 ft (317.0 m)
- Beam: Overall: 252 ft (76.8 m); Waterline: 134 ft (40.8 m)
- Draft: Maximum navigational: 37 ft (11.3 m); Limit: 41 ft (12.5 m)
- Propulsion: 2 × Westinghouse A4W nuclear reactors (HEU 93.5%); 4 × steam turbines; 4 × shafts; 260,000 shp (190 MW)
- Speed: 30 knots (56 km/h; 35 mph)+
- Range: Unlimited distance; 20–25 years
- Complement: Ship's company: 3,532; Air wing: 2,480
- Sensors & processing systems: SPS-48E 3-D air search radar; SPS-49A(V)1 2-D air search radar; SPQ-9B fire control radar; 2 × SPN-46 air traffic control radars; SPN-43C air traffic control radar; SPN-41 instrument landing system radar; 3 × Mk 91 NSSM guidance systems; 3 × Mk 95 radars
- Electronic warfare & decoys: AN/SLQ-32A(V)4 countermeasures suite; SLQ-25A Nixie torpedo countermeasures
- Armament: Evolved Sea Sparrow Missile; Rolling Airframe Missile; Close-in weapons system (CIWS)
- Aircraft carried: 90 fixed wing and helicopters

USS Ronald Reagan (CVN-76) is a Nimitz-class, nuclear-powered supercarrier in the service of the United States Navy. The ninth ship of her class, she is named in honor of Ronald Reagan, President of the United States from 1981 to 1989. She was built at Newport News Shipbuilding in Newport News, Virginia, and was commissioned on 12 July 2003.

Ronald Reagan made five deployments to the Pacific and Middle East between 2006 and 2011 while based at Naval Air Station North Island. In October 2015, Ronald Reagan replaced USS George Washington as the flagship of Carrier Strike Group 5, the only forward-based carrier strike group homeported at Yokosuka, Japan, as part of the United States Seventh Fleet. Since 2016, Ronald Reagan has embarked on short annual summer patrols of the Western Pacific in the United States Seventh Fleet area of operation.

== Design and construction ==
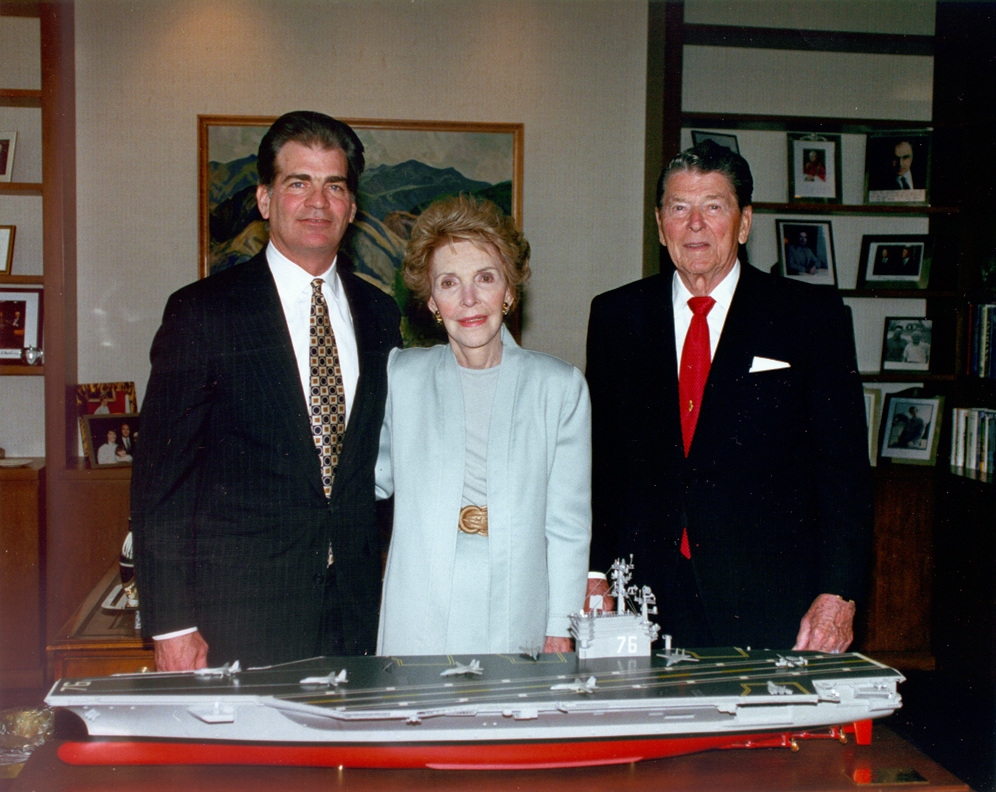
Former President Ronald Reagan and First Lady Nancy Reagan, as well as Newport News Shipbuilding Chairman and CEO William Fricks stand behind the model of the aircraft carrier USS Ronald Reagan (CVN-76). The model was presented to President Ronald Reagan in May 1994.

The contract to build Ronald Reagan was awarded to Northrop Grumman Newport News Shipbuilding and Dry Dock Company in Newport News, Virginia, on 8 December 1994 and her keel was laid down on 12 February 1998. The budget for the ship was increased several times and ultimately $4.5 billion was spent on her construction, including a redesigned ship island. Ronald Reagan was christened by Reagan's wife Nancy on 4 March 2001 at Newport News Shipbuilding; the crew moved aboard on 30 October 2002 and the ship was commissioned on 12 July 2003 at Naval Station Norfolk, with Captain J. W. Goodwin in command.

Vice President Dick Cheney and Second Lady Lynne Cheney were both present at the ceremony, along with Nancy Reagan, who gave the ship's crew the traditional first order as an active unit of the Navy: "Man the ship and bring her to life." Ronald Reagan made her maiden voyage on 21 July 2003. President Reagan, who did not attend either the launch or the commissioning due to his Alzheimer's disease, died 11 months later. At the end of the graveside services, the ship's commanding officer at that time, Captain James Symonds, at Mrs. Reagan's request presented her the flag that draped the former president's casket. This particular flag had flown over Capitol Hill on 20 January 1981 for Reagan's first inauguration. At a later date, Captain Symonds also presented Mrs. Reagan the flag that had been flying over Ronald Reagan when the former president died.

=== Naming ===
Ronald Reagan is the first aircraft carrier and first nuclear-powered warship of any type to be named in honor of a living former president. Unlike most of the men honored by inclusion in this group, Reagan was not associated with the United States Navy, apart from his term as Commander-in-Chief, although one of his key initiatives in office was the 600-ship Navy program.

=== Ship's seal ===
The Ronald Reagan's seal was designed entirely by her plankowner crew with historical assistance from staff members at the Ronald Reagan Presidential Library. The seal's red border is similar to the distinctive red rim on the White House china designed for the Reagans during their White House years. Four gold stars represent Reagan as 40th US president and his four pillars of freedom: individual liberty, economic opportunity, global democracy, and national pride. "Peace through Strength" was a recurring theme of Reagan's life in public service. The aircraft carrier is positioned on the West Coast, representing Reagan's two terms as governor of California and the ship's Pacific Fleet homeport. The three aircraft's patriotic contrails symbolize the three major military operations during Reagan's presidency: Operation Urgent Fury (Grenada/1983), Operation El Dorado Canyon (Libya/1986), and Operation Praying Mantis (Iran/1988). The view of the globe signifies Reagan's vision of global democracy, and the center is the United States, representing the country's national pride. Red, white, and blue dominate the seal, reflecting the American flag.

== Service history ==
On 8 May 2004, following a five-month post-shakedown availability, Ronald Reagan received her second flight deck certification covering all flight operations, including aircraft launch and recovery, safety, crash and salvage, fuel certifications, and training. Ronald Reagan then transited from Naval Station Norfolk, Virginia, through the Strait of Magellan to her new homeport, Naval Air Station North Island, San Diego, with Captain James A. Symonds in command.

Carrier Air Wing Eleven, normally assigned to USS Nimitz, embarked 25% of its total strength for the transit. The squadrons making the transit were VFA-14 and VFA-41 flying the F/A-18E/F Super Hornet, VAW-117 flying the E-2C Hawkeye 2000, HS-6 flying the SH-60F Seahawk, and VRC-30 flying the C-2A Greyhound. The ship visited Rio de Janeiro, Brazil, on 5 June 2004. During the first evening after arrival, the ship's namesake, former President Reagan, died. A ceremony in his honor was held onboard later that evening, after the US national anthem was publicly played. Upon leaving Rio, Ronald Reagan transited the Strait of Magellan on 20–21 June and subsequently visited Valparaíso, Chile, and Callao, Peru, before arriving in San Diego on 23 July 2004. From 1 October 2004, Ronald Reagan was assigned to Carrier Strike Group Fifteen.

During an anti-submarine warfare exercise in 2005, HSwMS Gotland, on loan from the Swedish Navy, managed to score multiple simulated attacks on Ronald Reagan while undetected, showcasing that the submarine was in a position to sink the carrier. This prompted the U.S. Navy to extend their lease of the submarine following the exercise, for further study.

=== 2006 maiden deployment ===
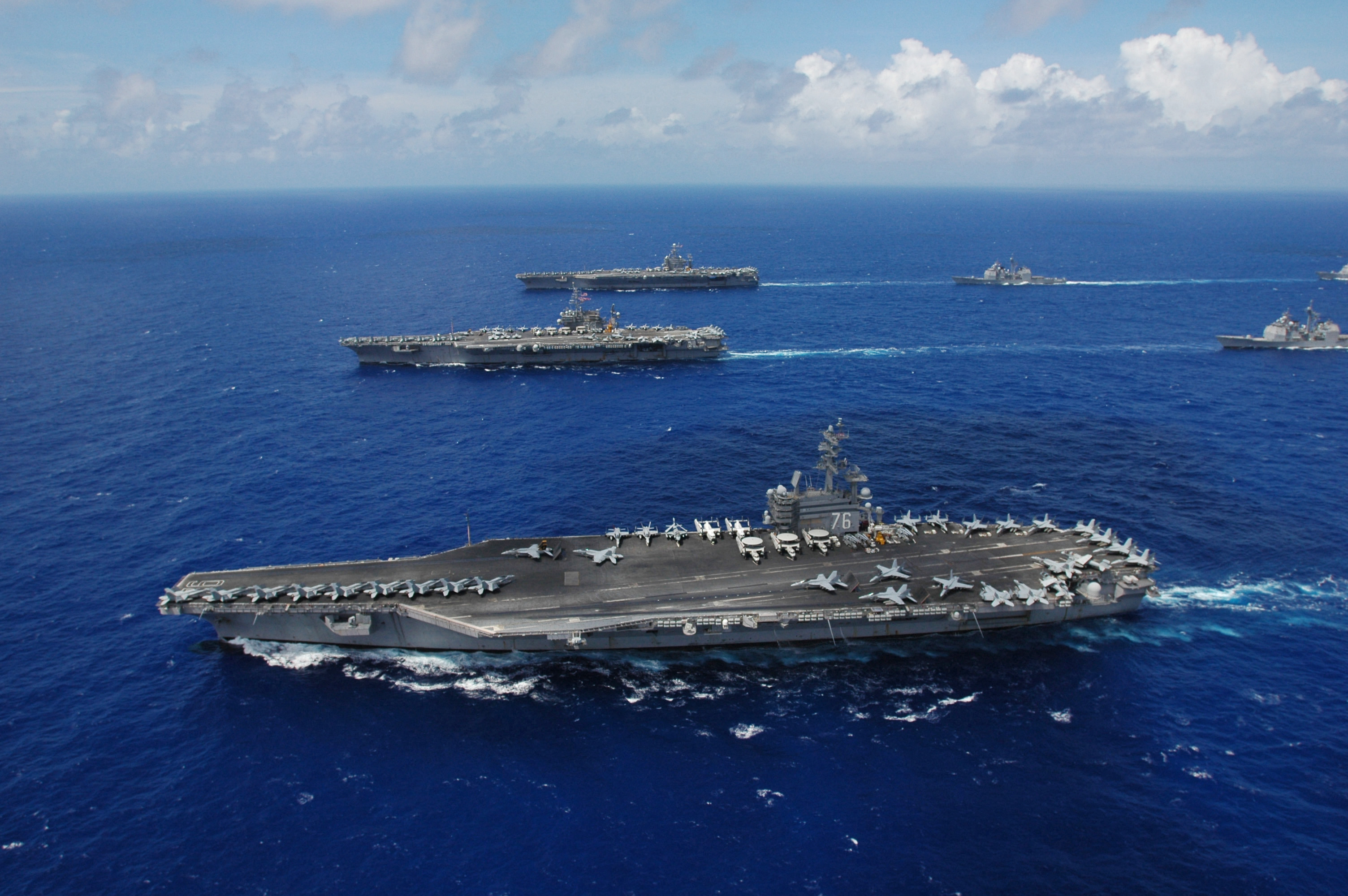
Ronald Reagan (foreground) operates with Kitty Hawk (center) and Abraham Lincoln (background) on her first cruise in June 2006

Ronald Reagan, with Terry B. Kraft in command, departed San Diego on 4 January 2006 on her maiden deployment conducting naval operations in support of Operation Iraqi Freedom and Operation Enduring Freedom, as well as maritime security operations in the Persian Gulf. On 28 January 2006, an F/A-18 Hornet strike fighter attempting landing aboard Ronald Reagan crashed into the ship's flight deck while the ship was about 200 km (120 mi) southeast of Brisbane, Queensland. The aircraft struck the ramp, missed the third cable, and skidded overboard. The pilot ejected safely, but the aircraft was lost. While in Brisbane, the carrier's main condensers became clogged with 1,900 pounds (860 kg) of jellyfish, causing problems in the main machinery rooms and hindering cooling of the main reactors. The ship entered the Persian Gulf on 22 February 2006, and returned from deployment on 6 July 2006.

=== 2007 surge deployment ===
Ronald Reagan and her Carrier Strike Group (CSG) departed North Island, Coronado in San Diego on 27 January 2007 on an unscheduled surge deployment to the Western Pacific, in place of the forward deployed carrier Kitty Hawk while she underwent maintenance in Japan. On 20 April 2007, Ronald Reagan and her CSG returned to Coronado. The "surge deployment" was part of the Navy's Fleet Response Plan, which provides the US with the ability to respond to any global commitment with flexible and sustainable forces and the ability to rapidly respond to a range of situations on short notice.

In January 2007, Ronald Reagan earned the 2006 Commander, Naval Air Forces Pacific Carrier Battle Efficiency "E" award for the West Coast, the first Battle "E" ever for the carrier.

Ronald Reagan returned to Naval Air Station North Island on 20 April 2007, following a three-month deployment in support of operations in the Western Pacific.

On 15 December 2007, the carrier answered a distress call from a cruise ship off the coast of Baja California. An SH-60 helicopter airlifted an Illinois teenager whose appendix had ruptured while on a Mexican cruise to Ronald Reagan, where the ship's surgeon performed an emergency appendectomy.

=== 2008 deployment ===
Ronald Reagan, with CVW-14 embarked, departed San Diego on 19 May 2008, for a scheduled 7th Fleet and 5th Fleet deployment.

The Ronald Reagan CSG performed humanitarian assistance and disaster relief operations in the Philippines on 24 June 2008 after that country was devastated by Typhoon Fengshen, that killed hundreds from the central island regions and the main island of Luzon. The typhoon also capsized the passenger ferry MV Princess of the Stars. Working in support of the Armed Forces of the Philippines, Ronald Reagan and her escorts of CSG 7 focused their efforts on the island of Panay in the Central Visayas. For eight days, SH-60 Seahawk helicopters and C-2A Greyhound aircraft of the Ronald Reagan CSG helped deliver more than 519,000 lb (235,000 kg) of rice, fresh water, and other supplies to areas of Panay, which were not reachable by truck due to flooded roads. The mission in Panay earned the entire strike group the Navy's Humanitarian Service Medal.

The CSG arrived in the U.S. Fifth Fleet area on 28 August 2008, where she launched more than 1,150 sorties into Afghanistan in support of Operation Enduring Freedom (OEF). Ronald Reagan returned to San Diego on 25 November 2008.

On 25 September 2008, Ronald Reagan, while underway in the Gulf of Oman, played host to the rock band Creed. Over 1500 members of the ship's crew crowded the flight deck to watch the band perform.

Ronald Reagan received word in February 2009 that the ship had won her second Battle Efficiency Award.

=== 2009 deployment ===
On 28 May 2009, Ronald Reagan deployed with Carrier Air Wing 14 to the 7th and 5th Fleet Areas of Responsibility. Ronald Reagan relieved the Dwight D. Eisenhower CSG and launched her first sorties in support of OEF on 6 July. Ronald Reagan returned to homeport on 21 October after a five-month deployment.

=== 2010 ===
In early 2010, Ronald Reagan was awarded the 2009 Chief of Naval Operations Afloat Safety "S" Award, and the 2009 Pacific Fleet Battle "E" for combat efficiency. The Battle "E" award was Ronald Reagan's second consecutive and third Battle E in four years.

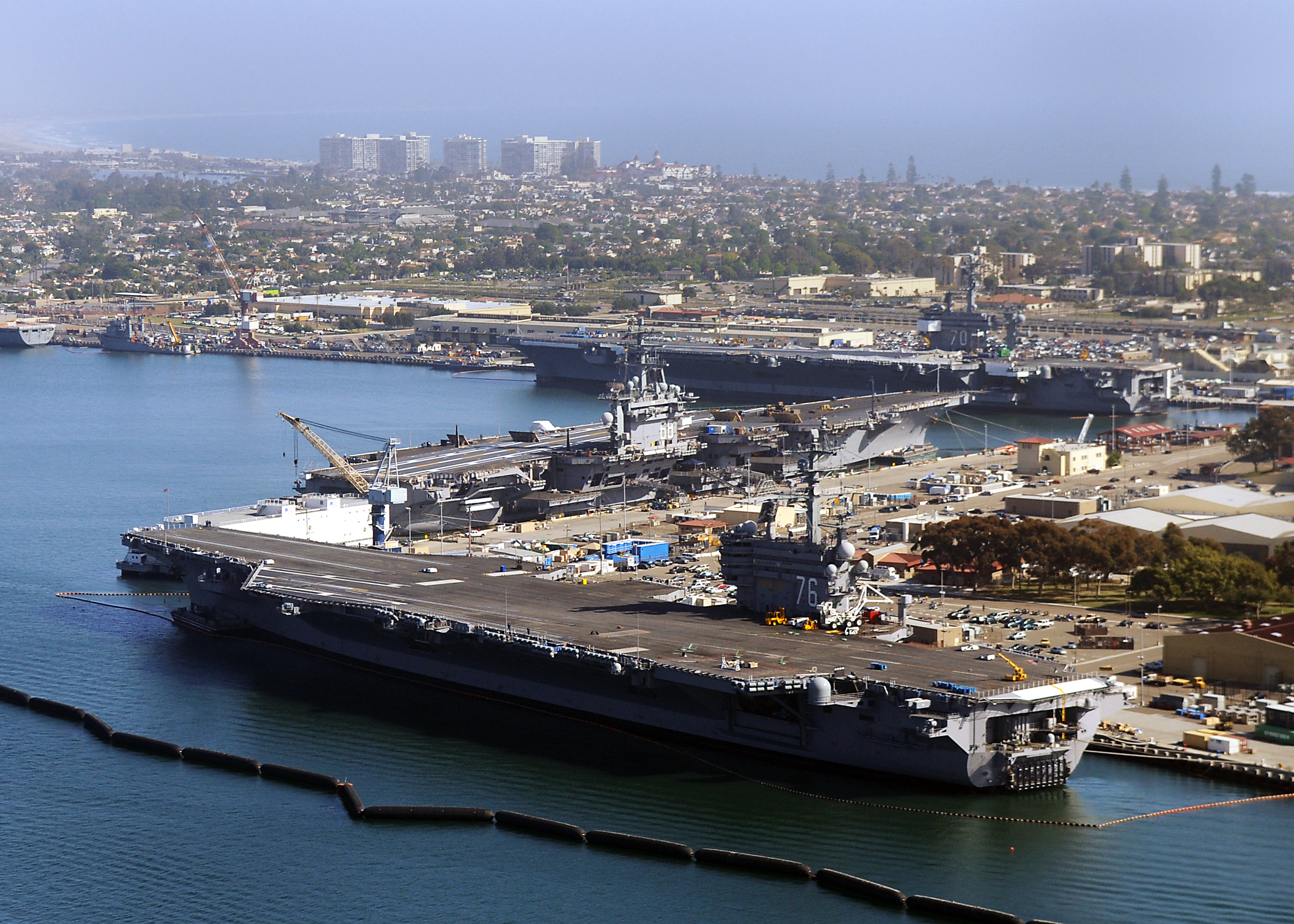
2010 PIA maintenance (6 May 2010)

On 19 May 2010, Norfolk Naval Shipyard completed the six-month Planned Incremental Availability (PIA) maintenance cycle on Ronald Reagan. This PIA project was under budget, and marked both Norfolk Naval Shipyard's largest off-site availability, as well as the largest public-sector work package ever performed on an aircraft carrier berthed at Naval Air Station North Island, Coronado, California. During the maintenance period, Ronald Reagan received technological upgrades for her next deployment and subsequent operations. Refurbishments included high-tech combat systems and firefighting equipment, improved ship's laundry services and living spaces. This PIA maintenance project was an example of the 'One Shipyard' concept wherein the US Navy mobilizes its work force across its various shipyards to better meet fleet readiness requirements and to stabilize a vital workforce base for the US defense industry. While Norfolk Naval Shipyard (NNSY) was the project lead, significant work was done by its partners: Puget Sound Naval Shipyard & Intermediate Maintenance Facility (PSNS), Southwest Regional Maintenance Center (SRMC), and Northrop Grumman Shipbuilding (NGSB). During peak manning, about 1,400 worked the project on a daily basis. This included rough 625 NNSY personnel, 165 PSNS employees, and 600 from SWRMC/NGSB.

On 18 May 2010, Ronald Reagan departed Naval Air Station North Island for sea trials. This was the final phase of the PIA, and was conducted to assess the carrier's material readiness to return to the operational fleet. Ronald Reagan pulled into Naval Air Station North Island on 19 May 2010 after completing her two-day sea trial, marking the official end to the ship's six-month PIA maintenance period.

On 2 June 2010, Ronald Reagan, with Carrier Air Wing Fourteen (CVW-14) embarked, departed Naval Air Station North Island to conduct flight deck certifications. Embarked squadrons included: Helicopter Antisubmarine Squadron 4 (HS-4), Marine Fighter Attack Squadron 323 (VMFA-323), Strike Fighter Squadron 154 (VFA-154), Strike Fighter Squadron 147 (VFA-147), Strike Fighter Squadron 146 (VFA-146), Airborne Early Warning Squadron 113 (VAW-113) and Fleet Logistics Squadron 30 (VRC-30). The certification included a full evaluation of the arresting gear, steam catapults, and flight-deck personnel. Ronald Reagan's air department was assessed on the ability to maintain a fully operational flight deck and respond to simulated mishaps.

During the summer of 2010, Ronald Reagan participated in Exercise RIMPAC, departed from Naval Air Station North Island, California, for a Board of Inspection and Survey assessment on 25 August 2010, and departed her homeport to conduct routine operations off the coast of southern California in preparation for her 2011 Western Pacific (WESTPAC) deployment. In November 2010, the ship provided emergency supplies and assistance to passengers stranded in the Pacific Ocean aboard the cruise ship Carnival Splendor, which had lost power due to an engine fire.

=== 2011 deployment ===
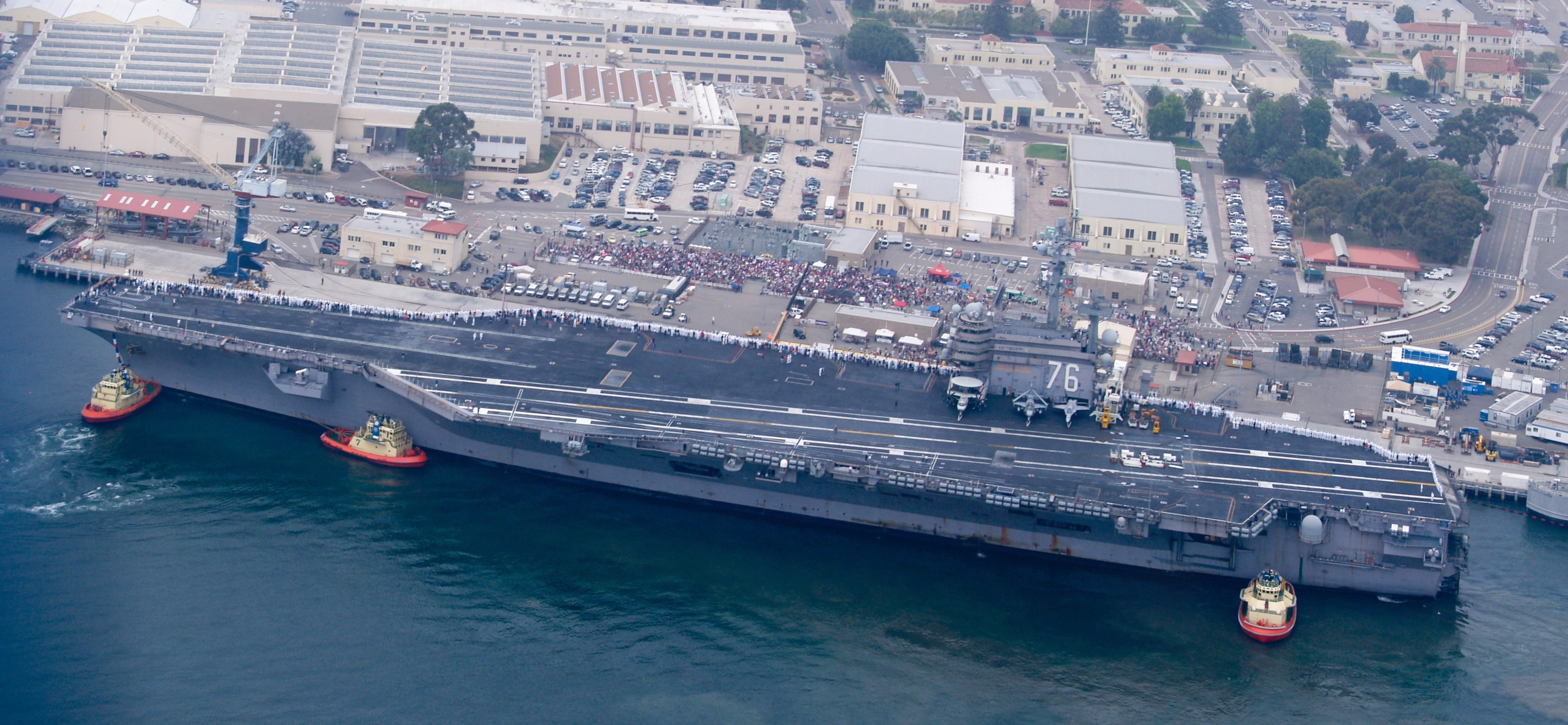
USS Ronald Reagan returning to San Diego Bay after a deployment, 2011

The ship departed for an Asian deployment on 2 February 2011. On 11 March 2011, Ronald Reagan was in the Korean peninsula region for a long-planned exercise off Korea, but was redirected towards Japan to provide support after the massive 2011 Tōhoku earthquake and tsunami. The ship, stationed off Sendai, served as a refueling station for Japanese coast guard and military helicopters on relief missions in the area. US Navy helicopters also flew relief missions from the carrier. On 13 March 2011, the ship measured 0.6 millirem/hr direct gamma shine from clouds 130 miles (≈210 km) from the Fukushima Daiichi Nuclear Power Plant. Members of the crew later blamed their cancers on the event. On 14 March 2011, the ship was forced to relocate to avoid a radioactive plume from the Fukushima I nuclear accidents which had contaminated 17 crew members of three helicopter crews. On 23 March, Ronald Reagan's crew performed radiation decontamination by scrubbing down any surface that could have been contaminated, including the island superstructure and flight deck, to remove any potential radiation hazards. On 4 April 2011, Japan's minister of defense, Toshimi Kitazawa, accompanied by US ambassador to Japan John Roos, visited the ship to thank the crew for their assistance as part of Operation Tomodachi. Said Kitazawa, "I have never been more encouraged by and proud of the fact that the United States is our ally." The ship returned to San Diego on 8 September 2011. In January 2011, the Navy announced that the aircraft carrier would be transferred to the Puget Sound Naval Ship Yard in Bremerton, Washington, for scheduled repair and maintenance beginning January 2012.

=== 2012 and 2013 ===
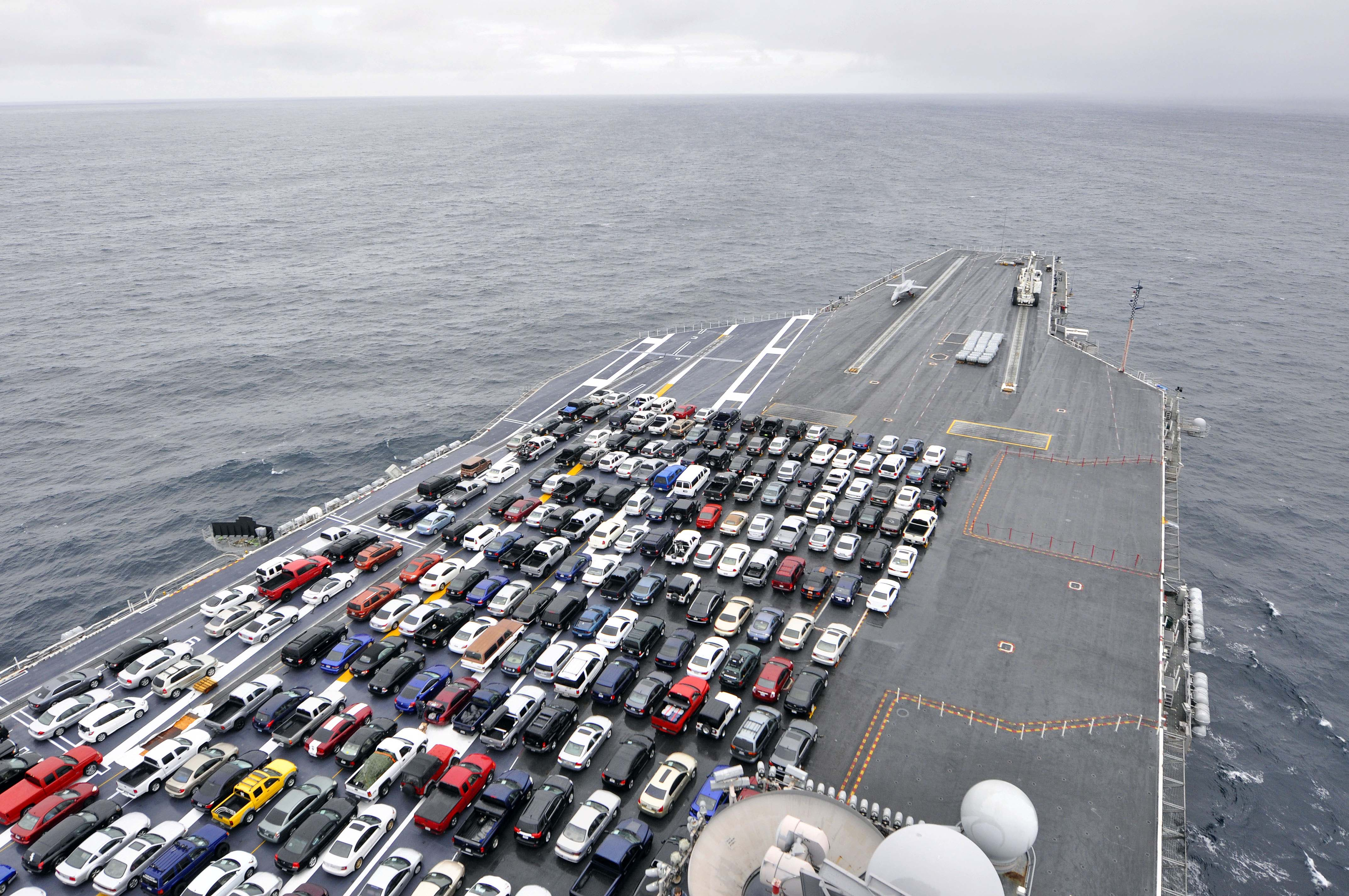
Sailors' personal vehicles carried on the trip from San Diego to Bremerton in 2012

On 10 January 2012, Ronald Reagan's official homeport was changed to Bremerton, Washington for a little over a year until returning to her homeport of San Diego on 21 March 2013. For the sailors being relocated, the Navy transported many privately owned vehicles on the deck of the ship as a cost-saving measure.

=== 2014 ===
On 14 January 2014, the Navy announced that Ronald Reagan would replace her sister ship George Washington as the Seventh Fleet forward deployed carrier at Yokosuka, Japan in 2015. Also in 2014, a USS Ronald Reagan commemorative challenge coin was created which is a symbolic 76 cents (CVN-76). The back has CPO 365 (Chief Petty Officer), a symbolic 50 stars wraps around the inside of the coin, and the text: "If you want it, you gotta earn it" is along the bottom of the coin. Centered is a US Navy rank which is half shiny silver and half shiny gold, along with the US Navy anchor logo.

=== 2015 homeport change and patrol ===
In 2015, Ronald Reagan replaced George Washington as the US Navy's only forward deployed aircraft carrier. In August, after a short patrol in the Pacific, George Washington docked in Naval Base San Diego alongside Ronald Reagan. A hull swap occurred over ten days, in which the crews assigned to each carrier switched ships. This was done to minimize the number of sailors who would need to move between San Diego to Japan due to the change in homeports of the two carriers. Ronald Reagan effectively took her new place as the flagship of Carrier Strike Group 5 and Carrier Air Wing Five (CVW-5). On 1 October 2015, she arrived in her newest homeport, Yokosuka in Kanagawa Prefecture. CVW-5 was based at Naval Air Facility Atsugi, which is also located in Kanagawa Prefecture. The ship was open for the public to tour on 12 October.

Ronald Reagan departed for her annual patrol of the Western Pacific on 15 October. On 29 October two Russian Tupolev Tu-142 bombers flew within one mile of the ship at low altitude. Four F/A-18 Super Hornets were scrambled in response. The ship conducted fleet exercises with the Japan Maritime Self-Defense Force and Republic of Korea Navy. During a fleet review with the JMSDF, the Prime Minister of Japan Shinzo Abe visited the ship. The ship returned to Yokosuka on 3 December.

=== 2016 patrol ===
On 4 June 2016, Ronald Reagan departed Yokosuka and was deployed with CSG 5 to the South China Sea before an international tribunal released its decision regarding a China and Philippines conflict. The ship returned after a 53-day cruise for a mid-cruise break and conducted Board of Inspection and Survey (INSURV) inspections designed to ensure the ship would last her full 50-year lifespan. She temporarily left port due to Typhoon Lionrock. After completing INSURV, she returned to sea on 3 September. The ship then participated in Exercise Valiant Shield 2016 before making a port call at Guam and participating in Invincible Spirit, a joint exercise with South Korean forces in the Sea of Japan and the Yellow Sea. Ronald Reagan returned to Yokosuka on 21 November.

=== 2017 ===
From 10 January, the ship began a period of Selected Restricted Availability with a focus on upgrading parts of the ship including the flight deck, hangar bays, and general living spaces. On 19 April the ship was visited by Vice President Mike Pence. On 7 May, the ship put to sea for sea trials before her annual patrol. After the short sea trials, Ronald Reagan returned to port, then left again on her annual cruise on 16 May to relieve her sister ship Carl Vinson, which had been deployed near North Korea in light of political tensions.

She visited Singapore in June and then sailed to Australia where she participated in Exercise Talisman Saber with Australian and other forces in July. She then made a port visit to Brisbane before returning to Japan on 9 August. On 8 September she departed Yokosuka again to conduct patrols off Korea after the North Korean missile launch over Japan and nuclear test. On 2 October the ship visited Hong Kong. She then participated in drills with the Japan Maritime Self-Defense Force off Okinawa. After that, Ronald Reagan participated in drills off the Korean peninsula with the South Korean Navy. After the drills, she made a port visit at Busan in South Korea.

On 29 October, Ronald Reagan scrambled an undisclosed number of Super Hornets to intercept two Russian Tu-95MS bombers that were heading towards the carrier on a Tokyo Express flight near Japan. The Russian bombers were accompanied by their own Su-35S escort fighters. During their flights the bombers were also intercepted by F-2, F-4 and F-15 fighters of the Japan Air Self-Defense Force. In November destroyers assigned to Ronald Reagan conducted exercises with the Indian Navy after which the Indian Navy ships joined by a Japan Self-Defense Forces destroyer conducted more exercises with Ronald Reagan.

Later in November, the vessel conducted drills with two other US aircraft carriers, Nimitz and Theodore Roosevelt. It was the first time in a decade that three US carrier strike groups had operated together in Asia. They were also joined by the Japanese helicopter destroyer Ise and the guided missile destroyers Inazuma and Makinami. After working with the Japanese warships the carrier groups conducted drills with seven South Korean vessels, including two Aegis-equipped destroyers. The drills were timed to coincide with the Asian tour of US President Donald Trump amid tensions with North Korea.

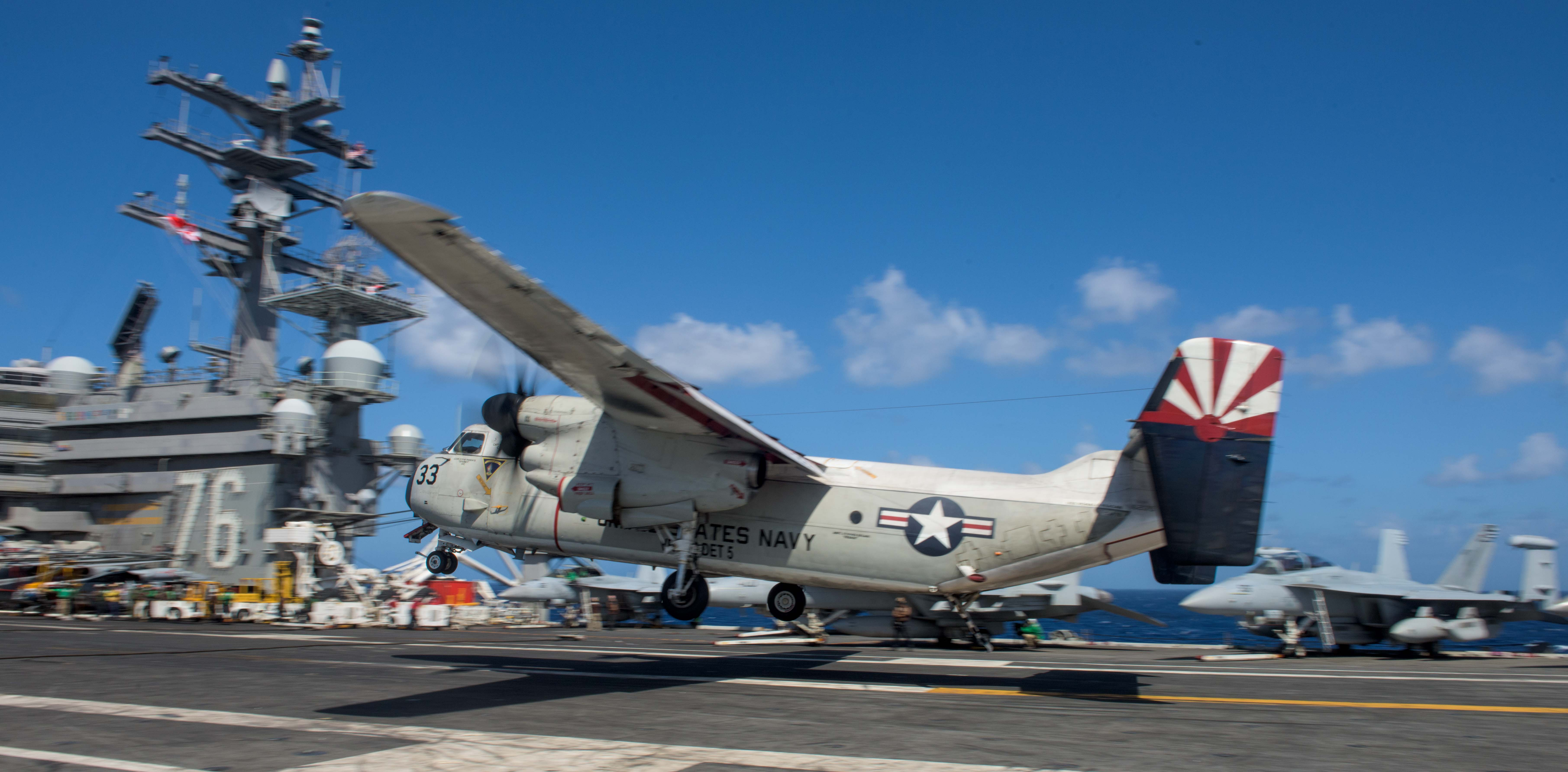
The lost C-2A, seen here landing in July 2017

On 22 November, a C-2A Greyhound cargo plane of VRC-30 with 11 crew and passengers aboard crashed into the Philippine Sea 145 km northwest of Okinotorishima while flying from Marine Corps Air Station Iwakuni to the carrier. It was the first C-2 loss since 2005, and the first fatal crash since 1973. Eight of the 11 were rescued. Ronald Reagan returned to Yokosuka on 4 December.

=== 2018 ===
On 17 May, Ronald Reagan conducted sea trials, and, on 28 May 2018, she departed on her regular patrol of the Pacific. Her departure was several weeks late. The delay was caused by a "material issue" that required repairs to issues found during the sea trials. Field Carrier Landing Practice for aircrew on Iwo Jima were also delayed. After patrolling through the disputed South China Sea, the ship visited the Philippines for the first time, and stayed for four days.

From 7 to 16 June, the carrier participated in the Malabar 2018 exercise with Japan and India near Guam. Ronald Reagan returned to Yokosuka on 24 July. On 27 July along with other vessels she left port again to avoid Typhoon Jongdari, returning on 30 July. She left port again ahead of a typhoon on 7 August. On 31 August 2018, the carrier conducted training with the Izumo-class helicopter destroyer Kaga, of the Japan Maritime Self-Defense Force.

On 21 November 2018, the ship visited Hong Kong. The ship backfitted the existing AN/SPS-48E three-dimensional (3D), air search radar with the AN/SPS-48G.

=== 2019 ===
On 24 August 2019, Ronald Reagan returned to Yokosuka Naval Base, after a very short patrol of the western Pacific. The vessel made two stops over the deployment. First at Brisbane to join the 2019 Exercise Talisman Saber off Australia's east coast, then at Manila for a brief port visit on the week of 11 August; between those two points the ship had transited the South China Sea in order to send a message to Beijing that the seas must be free and open. Admiral Karl O. Thomas used "Freedom of Navigation Operations" to stress that point when his weaker allies could not. The ship also participated in several exercises at sea with partner nations, most recently with the Japan Maritime Self-Defense Force.

=== 2020 ===
The coronavirus pandemic was reported to have spread to Ronald Reagan when the first two cases were reported on 27 March 2020. The positive cases forced the closure of the naval base outside Tokyo where the carrier is based, with all personnel on base told to stay indoors for 48 hours.

On 5 July 2020, the Ronald Reagan Carrier Strike Group was deployed to the South China Sea along with USS Nimitz.

=== 2021 ===
On 26 June 2021, Ronald Reagan was deployed to the Middle East to help with the withdrawal of US troops from Afghanistan.

=== 2022 ===
In late May 2022, Ronald Reagan was relieved by USS Abraham Lincoln at Sasebo, Japan. Ronald Reagan led Carrier Strike Group 5 into the Philippine Sea.

Ronald Reagan departed Singapore's Changi Naval Base on 23 July to transit the South China Sea. President Joe Biden exchanged words with Chinese Communist Party leader Xi Jinping over Nancy Pelosi's visit to Taiwan, which was only a possibility at that point. Chinese Foreign Ministry spokesman Zhao Lijian that his bosses were getting "seriously prepared".

On 4 August 2022, United States National Security Council spokesman John Kirby announced that Ronald Reagan had been ordered to remain in the vicinity of Taiwan in response to missile launches conducted by China, which in turn were a response to Speaker of the United States House of Representatives Nancy Pelosi's visit to Taiwan. On 19 August 2022, Ronald Reagan returned to her home port of Yokosuka, Japan.

On 12 September 2022, Ronald Reagan departed Yokosuka for the second leg of her regional patrol. Ronald Reagan arrived at Busan, South Korea for a scheduled port visit on 23 September 2022. This was the first time in four years that a US Navy aircraft carrier had visited South Korea.

=== 2023 ===
In March 2023 a seaman assigned to the ship died after falling from his Yokosuka barracks. American investigators reviewed his telephone. This led to the unraveling of a drug ring aboard the aircraft carrier. The investigation resulted in six courts-martial, 24 administrative separations and 28 cases of nonjudicial punishment. The ring brought LSD and other drugs into Japan by the U.S. Postal Service and distributed hundreds of LSD tablets to members of the ship's company.

In April 2023, the Commander, Naval Air Forces announced that USS George Washington would again be homeported at Fleet Activities Yokosuka in Japan and would relieve Ronald Reagan beginning in 2024. Ronald Reagan will depart Yokosuka and relocate to Bremerton, Washington, to conduct a scheduled Drydocking at Puget Sound Naval Shipyard. On 25 June 2023, Ronald Reagan and two escort cruisers, Antietam and Robert Smalls, made a port call in Tien Sa port in Da Nang, Vietnam and remained until 30 June. This is the third visit a US carrier has made to Vietnam since 2018, with another visit occurring in 2020.

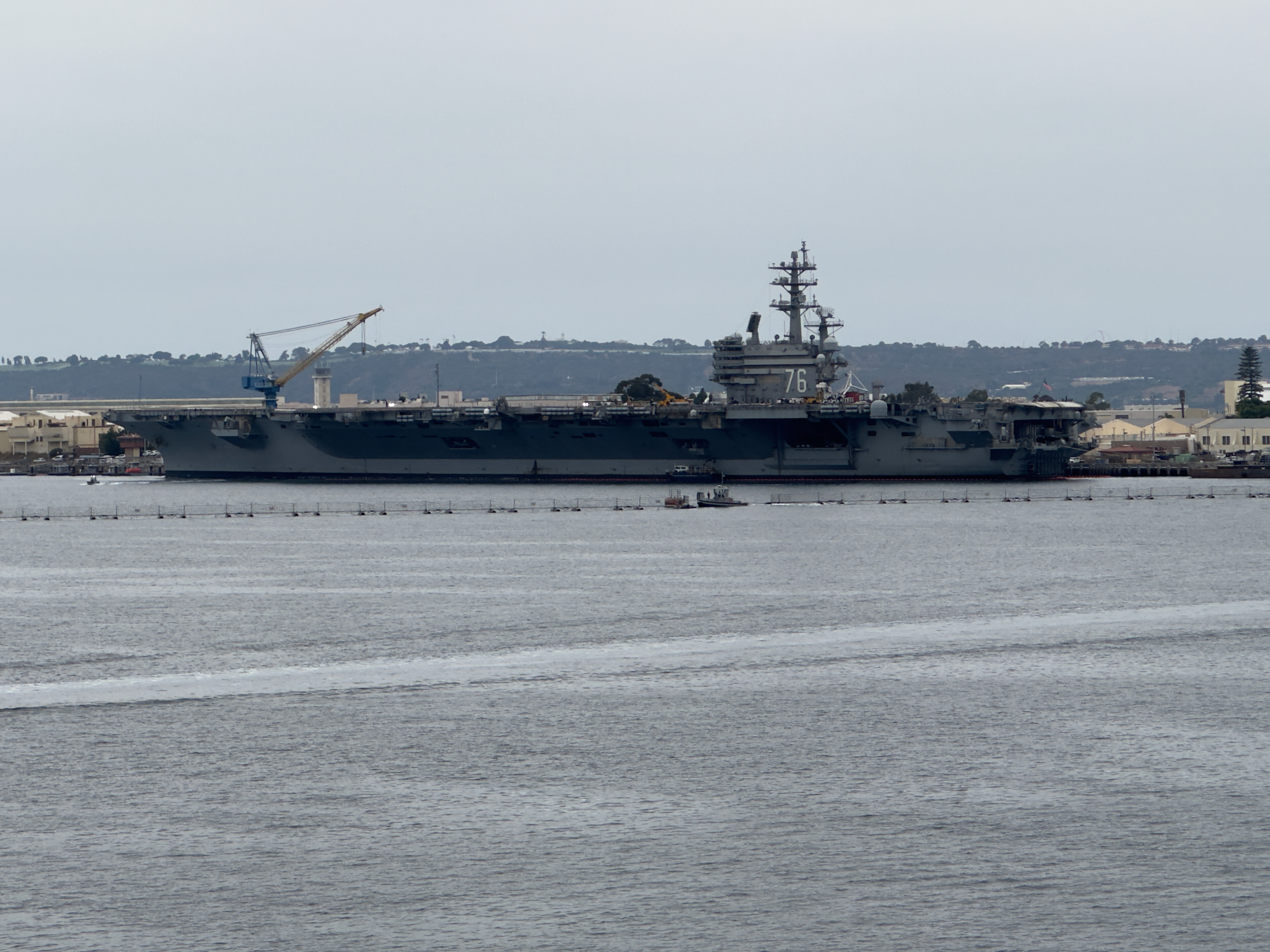
USS Ronald Reagan at San Diego in 2024

=== 2024 ===
In May 2024, the ship left Yokosuka for her final patrol as the US Navy's only forward deployed carrier in advance of her homeport change to Naval Base Kitsap. This is concurrent with USS George Washington's homeport shift to Yokosuka.

=== 2025 ===
In 2025, she was being readied for her Drydocking Planned Incremental Availability (DPIA), which was to be completed by August 2026 at the Dry Dock #6 on Puget Sound Naval Shipyard and Intermediate Maintenance Facility (PSNS&IMF).

=== 2026 ===
USS Ronald Reagan successfully undocked in February while in the final months of its 18-month Drydocking Planned Incremental Availability (DPIA). The maintenance period concluded in September 2026, with the ship being returned to the US Navy.

== See also ==
- Carrier-based aircraft
- Carrier Strike Group 5
- List of aircraft carriers of the United States Navy
- List of United States Navy aircraft designations (pre-1962) / List of currently active United States naval aircraft
- Modern United States Navy carrier air operations
- Naval aviator (United States)
