= William R. Merz =

U.S. Navy admiral

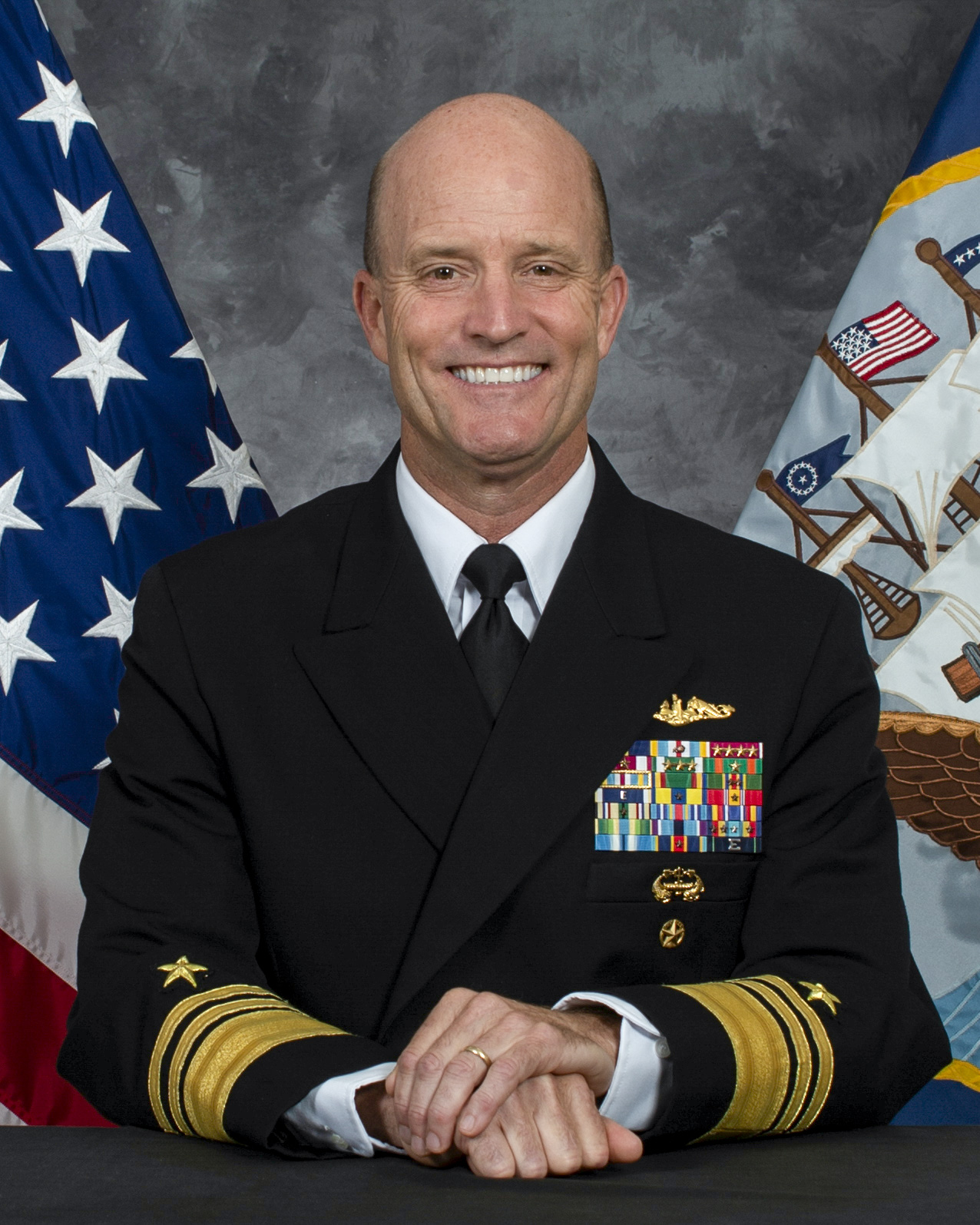
- Merz in 2019
- Born: March 10, 1963 (age 63); San Diego, California, U.S.
- Military career
- Allegiance: United States
- Branch: United States Navy
- Service years: 1986–2022
- Rank: Vice Admiral
- Nickname: Bill Merz
- Commands: United States Seventh Fleet
- Awards: Navy Distinguished Service Medal (3); Defense Superior Service Medal (2); Legion of Merit (5); Battenberg Cup (Atlantic Fleet)

William Rhode Merz (born March 10, 1963) is a retired United States Navy vice admiral who last served as deputy chief of naval operations for operations, plans and strategy from August 6, 2021 to October 7, 2022. He previously served as commander of U. S. Seventh Fleet from 2019 to 2021.

Merz's aboard assignments include USS Blue Ridge (LCC-19), "Submarine Group Seven" and Task Force 74. As a flag officer, he was assigned to commands at naval mine destroyer ships and anti-submarine warfare command. Later, he was appointed to Task Force 77 stationed at San Diego and TF-54 in Bahrain.

== Education ==
Bill Merz was born in San Diego, California. In 1986, he graduated with merit from the United States Naval Academy, earning a Bachelor of Science Degree in Ocean Engineering. He later earned Master's Degrees from The Catholic University of America and the Naval War College. VADM Merz also completed the MIT seminar XXI program and the University of Virginia "Strategic Thinking" program.

== Career ==
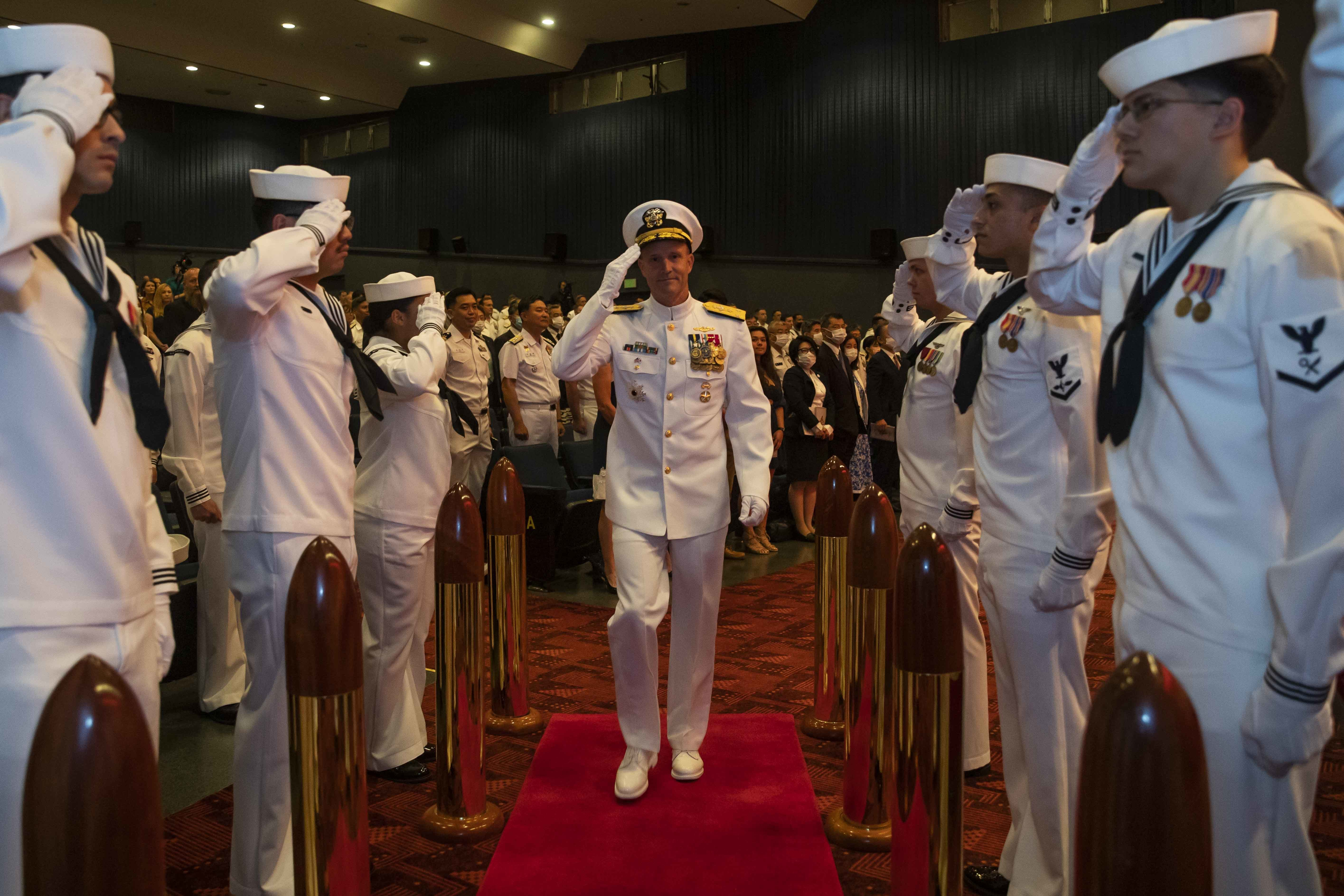
Commander, U.S. 7th Fleet Vice Adm. Bill Merz salutes side boys as he arrives at the Fleet Activities Yokosuka Theater for the 7th Fleet change of command.

VADM Merz served as a director during his ashore flag officer assignments, including Naval Undersea Warfare Center for a ballistic missile submarine program (OPNAV N97). Later, he was appointed as the Deputy Chief of Naval Operations for warfare systems (DCNO OPNAV N9). His submarine design research assignments includes commanding officer of the U.S. naval reactors, chief of staff for the Submarine Force Commander. As a submariner, Merz was assigned to USS Haddo in San Diego, USS Proteus in Guam, and USS Boise in Norfolk. After serving aboard, he was assigned to command the deep-submergence vehicle NR-1, Los Angeles-class submarine USS Memphis and a submarine squadron.

== Awards and decorations ==

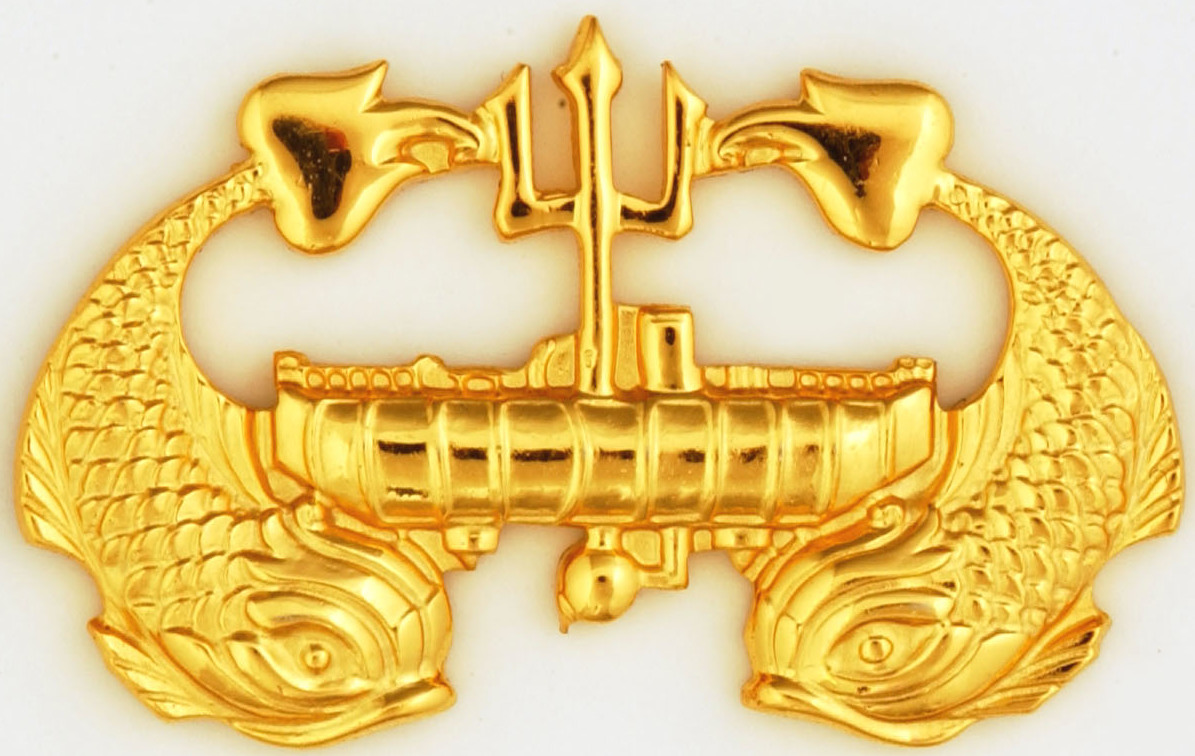

Submarine Warfare Officer Insignia
Navy Distinguished Service Medal with award star
Defense Superior Service Medal with bronze oak leaf cluster	Legion of Merit with four award stars	Meritorious Service Medal with three award stars
Navy and Marine Corps Commendation Medal with award star	Navy and Marine Corps Achievement Medal with award star	Joint Meritorious Unit Award
Navy Unit Commendation	Navy Meritorious Unit Commendation with two bronze service stars	Navy E Ribbon, 1st award
Navy Expeditionary Medal with bronze service star	National Defense Service Medal with bronze service star	Southwest Asia Service Medal with bronze service star
Global War on Terrorism Expeditionary Medal	Global War on Terrorism Service Medal	Armed Forces Service Medal
Humanitarian Service Medal	Navy Sea Service Deployment Ribbon with one silver and three bronze service stars	Navy Arctic Service Ribbon
Navy and Marine Corps Overseas Service Ribbon with bronze service star	Order of the Rising Sun, 2nd Class	Navy Expert Pistol Shot Medal
Deep Submergence Insignia in gold
Command at Sea insignia
Office of the Joint Chiefs of Staff Identification Badge

Military offices
Preceded by ???	Commander of Submarine Group 7; 201?–2016	Succeeded by Richard A. Correll
Preceded by Charles A. Richard	Director of Undersea Warfare of the United States Navy; 2016	Succeeded by Brian Howes; Acting
Vacant Title last held by Joseph P. Aucoin	Deputy Chief of Naval Operations for Warfare Systems of the United States Navy; 2016–2019	Succeeded by James Kilby
Preceded by Phillip G. Sawyer	Commander of the United States Seventh Fleet; 2019–2021	Succeeded by Karl O. Thomas
Preceded by Phillip G. Sawyer	Deputy Chief of Naval Operations for Operations, Plans and Strategy of the United States Navy; 2021–2022	Succeeded by Eugene H. Black III
