= James Symonds =

American admiral

James A. Symonds
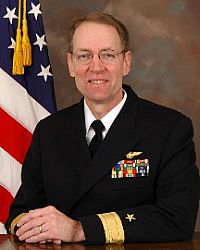
- Born: January 6, 1953 (age 73); Sodus, New York, U.S.
- Military career
- Allegiance: United States
- Branch: Navy
- Service years: 1976–2010
- Rank: Rear Admiral
- Conflicts: Cold War

James A. Symonds (born January 6, 1953) is an American retired rear admiral of the United States Navy who last served as Commander, Navy Region Northwest, based in Silverdale, Washington. He was the former commanding officer of the aircraft carrier USS Ronald Reagan. He had a prominent, symbolic role in the state funeral of former United States President Ronald Reagan in 2004.

== Early life and education ==
Symonds is a native of Sodus, New York. He attended the State University of New York at Albany and graduated with a Bachelor's degree in mathematics in 1975. He later was commissioned at the Aviation Officer Candidate School at Naval Air Station Pensacola, Florida that September and was designated a Naval Flight Officer in July 1976.

== Military career ==
Symonds served one operational tour assigned as an A-6 Intruder bombardier/navigator in Attack Squadron 115, aboard the aircraft carrier USS Midway. In 1983, he became a naval aviator after being selected for pilot training and returned to Naval Air Station Whidbey Island. He then participated in two additional operational tours with Attack Squadron 196. He was deployed on board USS Constellation and USS Independence amidst Operation Desert Storm.

In October 1992, Symonds was promoted to executive officer of Attack Squadron 165 on USS Nimitz and took full command the following October. In 1995 he attended Navy Nuclear Power Training. Symonds was later assigned as executive officer of USS Dwight D. Eisenhower, and led the ship on a 1998 deployment order to the Mediterranean Sea; he assumed command of USS Nashville in 2001.

=== USS Ronald Reagan ===
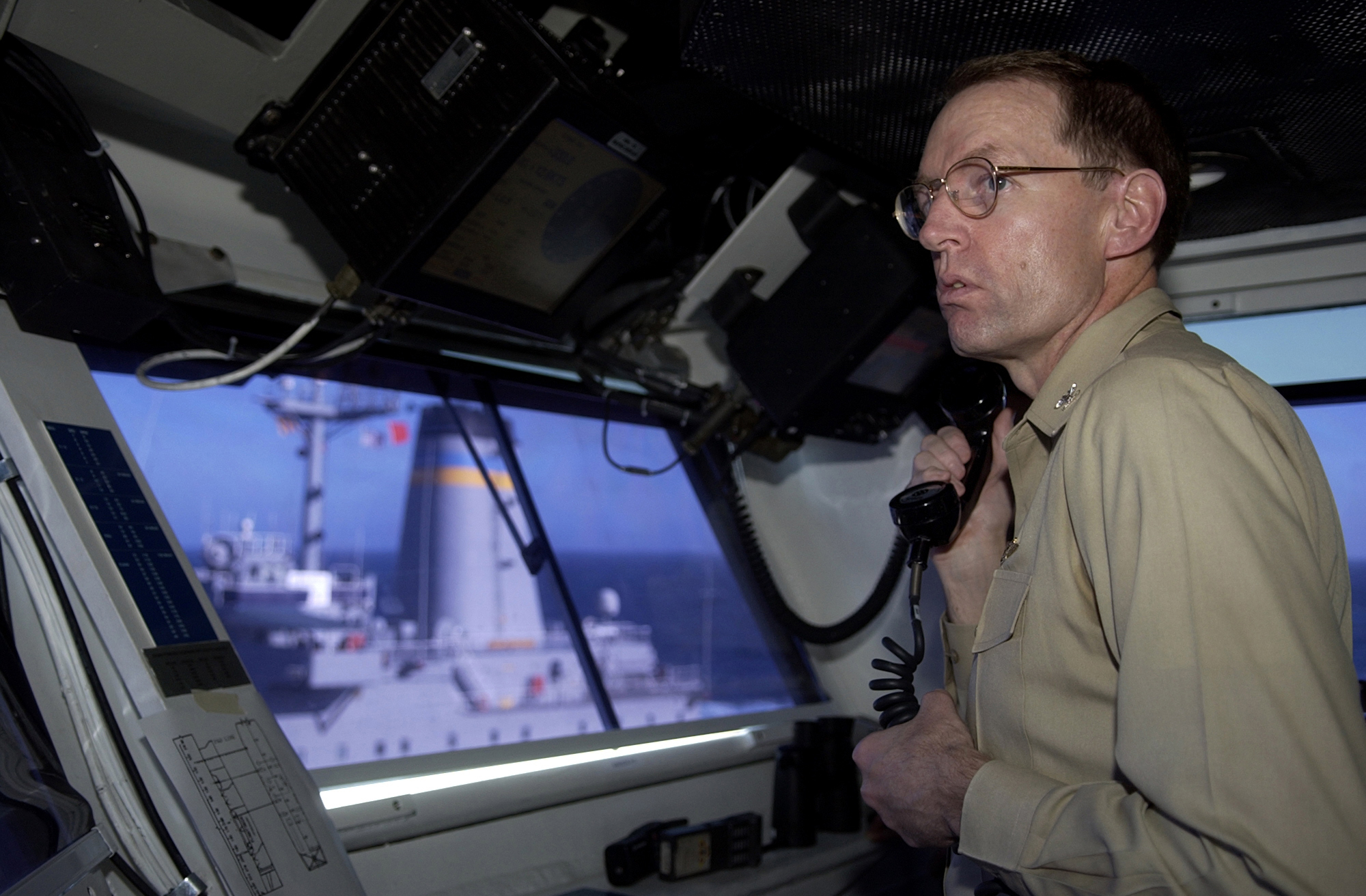
Symonds oversees an underway replenishment on the navigation bridge of USS Ronald Reagan

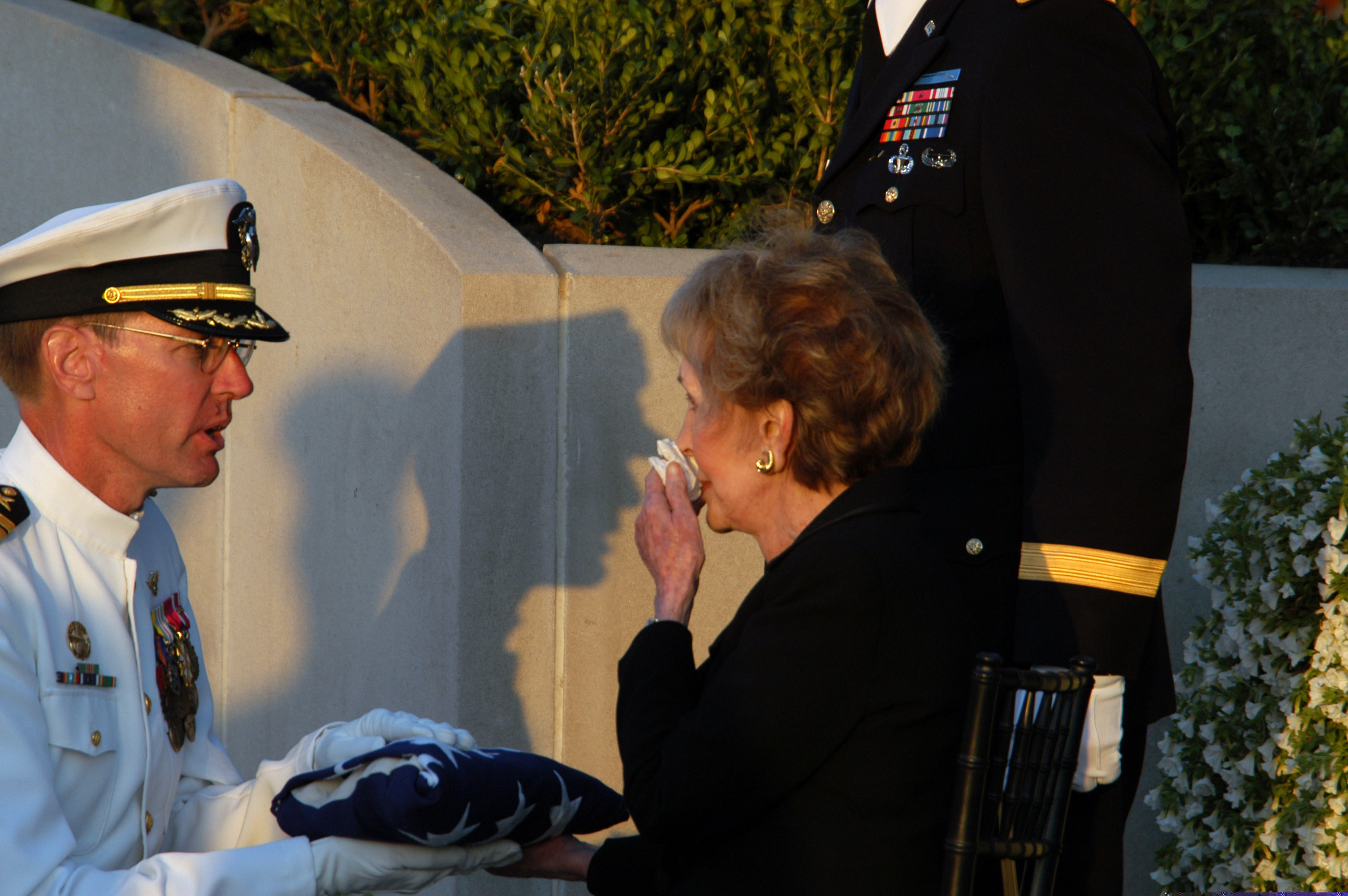
Captain Symonds presents the flag that draped President Ronald Reagan's casket to former first lady Nancy Reagan, June 11, 2004

In August 2003 Symonds became commanding officer of USS Ronald Reagan, the Navy's newest aircraft carrier. He presided over the ship's transfer from Norfolk, Virginia to its homeport in San Diego, California.

On June 5, 2004, while Symonds was commanding officer, former president Ronald Reagan, the ship's namesake, died at his home in California. Upon former First Lady Nancy Reagan's request, the commanding officer of USS Ronald Reagan would present her the American flag that draped the president's casket; at the time, it was Symonds. Following a national funeral service in the Washington National Cathedral and six days of public mourning, Symonds presented Nancy Reagan with the flag at President Reagan's gravesite at the Ronald Reagan Presidential Library prior to his interment.

=== Recent career ===
Symonds turned over command of USS Ronald Reagan to Captain Terry Kraft on November 17, 2005. His more recent posts have been Navy Director of Environmental Readiness and commander of the Navy Region Northwest, a position he took up in July 2007.

== Awards ==
- Defense Superior Service Medal
- Legion of Merit (three awards)
- Meritorious Service Medal (four awards)
- Strike Flight Medal
- Navy and Marine Corps Commendation Medal (three awards)
- Navy and Marine Corps Achievement Medal (two awards)
