= Karl O. Thomas =

U.S. Navy admiral

Karl Owen Thomas
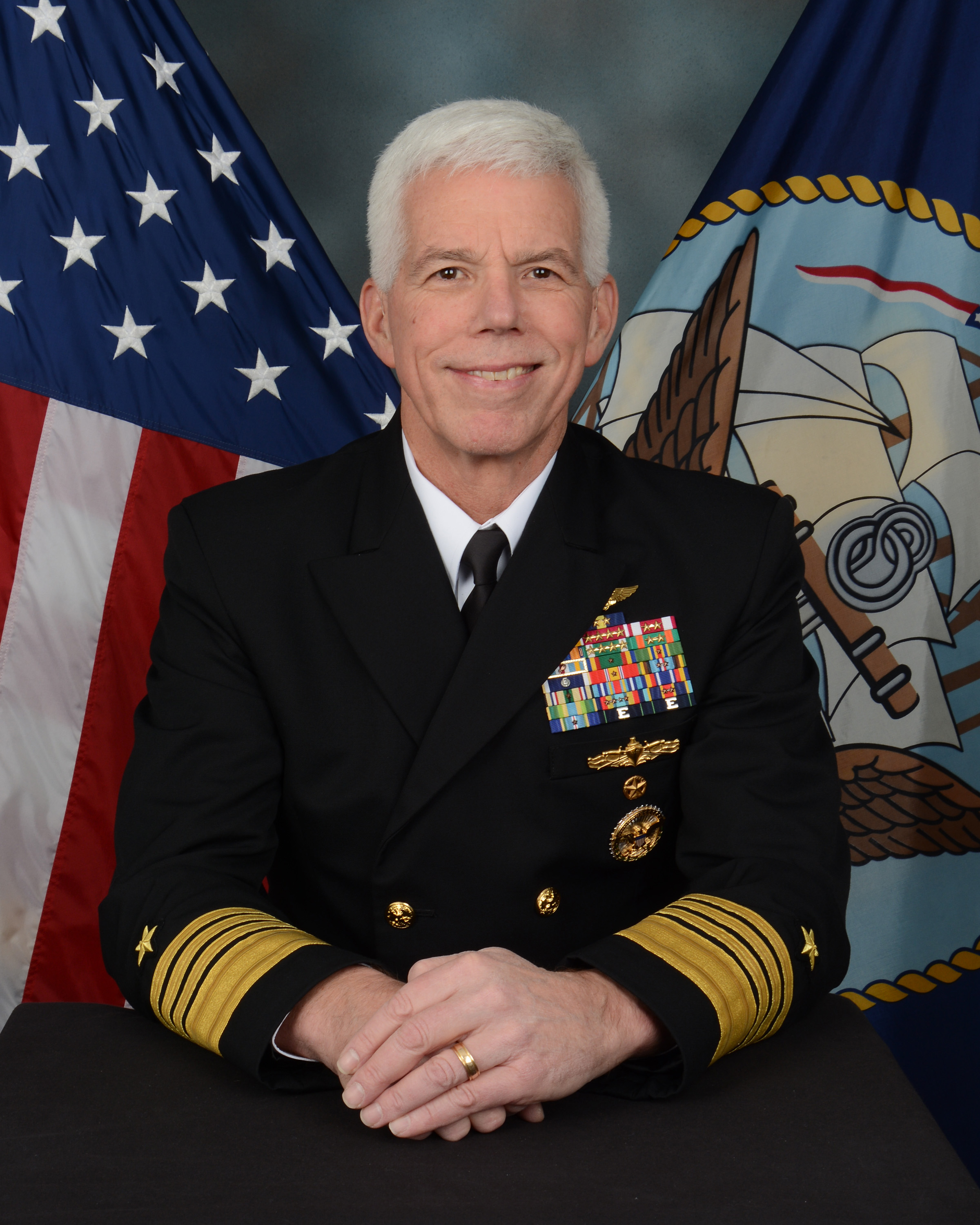
- Official portrait, 2025
- Born: 1 November 1962 (age 63); Fairfax, Virginia, U.S.
- Military career
- Allegiance: United States
- Branch: United States Navy
- Service years: 1986–present
- Rank: Admiral
- Commands: United States Fleet Forces Command; United States Naval Forces Northern Command; United States Naval Forces Strategic Command; United States Seventh Fleet; Carrier Strike Group 5 USS Carl Vinson; USS Abraham Lincoln; USS Mount Whitney; VAW-117
- Awards: Navy Distinguished Service Medal; Defence Superior Service Medal; Legion of Merit (5)

Karl Owen Thomas (born 1 November 1962) is a United States Navy admiral who serves as the commander of U.S. Fleet Forces Command. He most recently served as the deputy chief of naval operations for information warfare and Director of Naval Intelligence.

== Biography ==
Born in Fairfax, Virginia, and raised in Northern Virginia, Thomas earned a bachelor's degree in management systems from the Rensselaer Polytechnic Institute in 1986 and received his commission though the school's Naval Reserve Officers Training Corps program. He later received a Master of Science degree in information technology from the Naval Postgraduate School.

Thomas started off as a carrier aviator in the E-2C Hawkeye; he rose quickly to serve as commanding officer of VAW-117 during Operation Iraqi Freedom. He has served on USS Dwight D. Eisenhower (CVN-69), USS George Washington (CVN-73), U.S. 6th Fleet Command Ship, USS Mount Whitney (LCC-20), USS Abraham Lincoln (CVN-72) and USS Carl Vinson (CVN-70) in support of Operation Inherent Resolve.

Thomas served as the commander of Carrier Strike Group 5 for a time, deploying on USS Ronald Reagan (CVN-76) out of Yokosuka, Japan. While in that role he took the opportunity to stress "Freedom of Navigation Operations" when his weaker allies couldn't. CVN 76 transited the South China Sea regularly in order to send a message to Beijing that the seas must be free and open.

He then served as Assistant Deputy Chief of Naval Operations for Operations, Plans, and Strategy.

In April 2021, he was nominated for promotion to vice admiral and assignment to relieve Vice Admiral William R. Merz as commander of the United States Seventh Fleet.

In November 2025, he was nominated for promotion to admiral and recently took over as the commander of U.S. Fleet Forces Command on 1 December 2025

== Awards and decorations ==
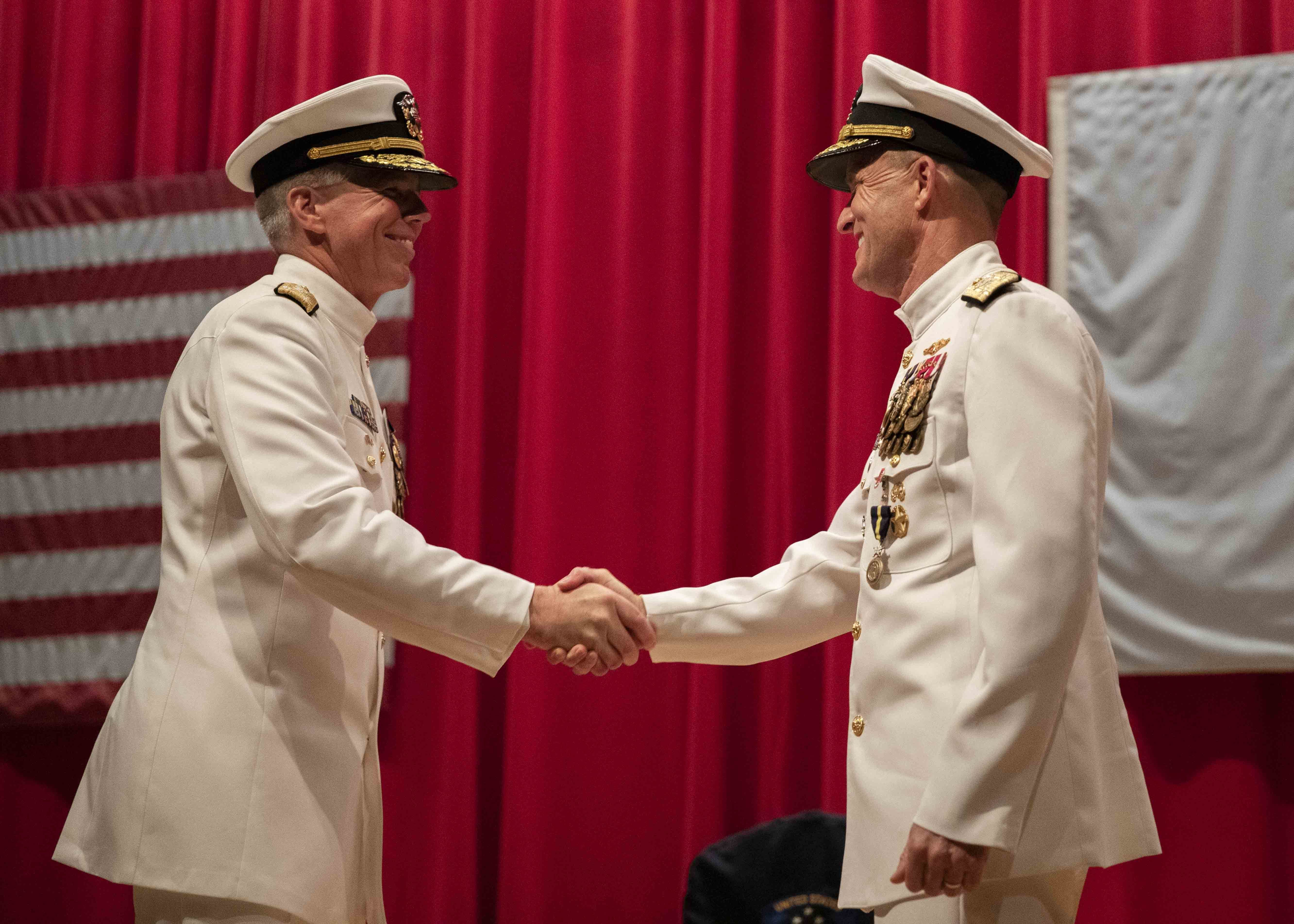
Commander, U.S. 7th Fleet Vice Adm. Karl Thomas relieves Vice Adm. Bill Merz of command during the 7th Fleet change of command ceremony at the Fleet Activities Yokosuka Theater

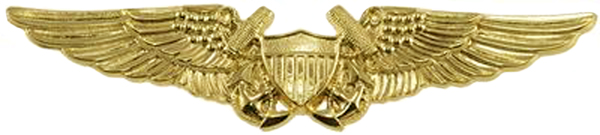

Naval Flight Officer Badge
Navy Distinguished Service Medal with two award stars
Defense Superior Service Medal	Legion of Merit with four award stars	Meritorious Service Medal with two award stars
Air Medal with Award numeral 1	Navy and Marine Corps Commendation Medal with four award stars	Navy and Marine Corps Achievement Medal with two award stars
Joint Meritorious Unit Commendation with bronze oak leaf cluster	Navy Unit Commendation with bronze service star	Navy Meritorious Unit Commendation with two bronze service stars
Navy E Ribbon, 4th award	National Defense Service Medal with bronze service star	Armed Forces Expeditionary Medal with two bronze service stars
Southwest Asia Service Medal with bronze service star	Global War on Terrorism Expeditionary Medal	Global War on Terrorism Service Medal
Armed Forces Service Medal	Navy Sea Service Deployment Ribbon with one silver and three bronze service stars	Navy and Marine Corps Overseas Service Ribbon with bronze service star
Special Operations Service Ribbon with bronze service star	Navy Expert Rifleman Medal	Navy Expert Pistol Shot Medal
Surface Warfare Officer Pin
Command at Sea insignia
Office of the Secretary of Defense Identification Badge

== Gallery ==
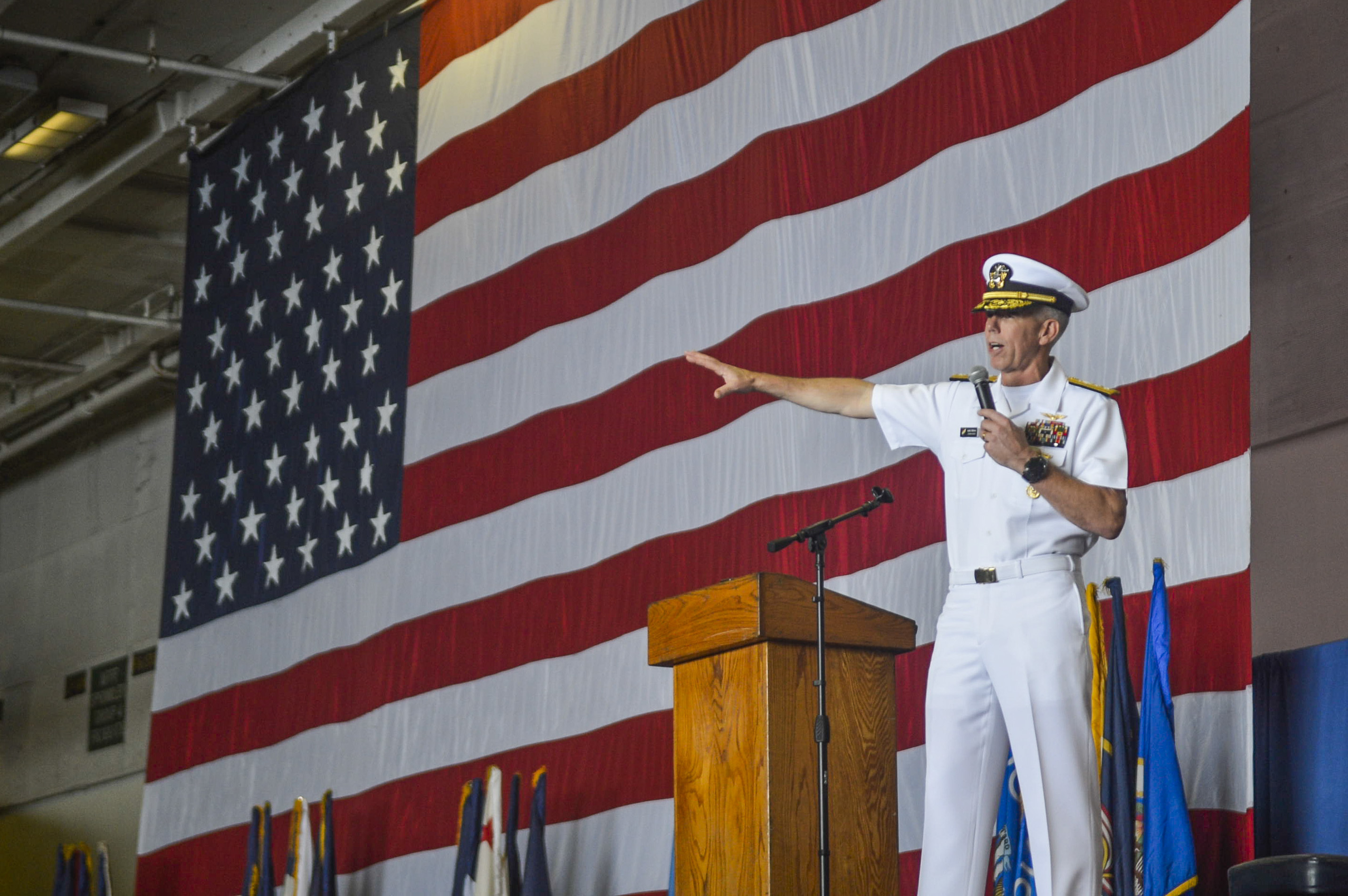
At the change of command ceremony in 2018

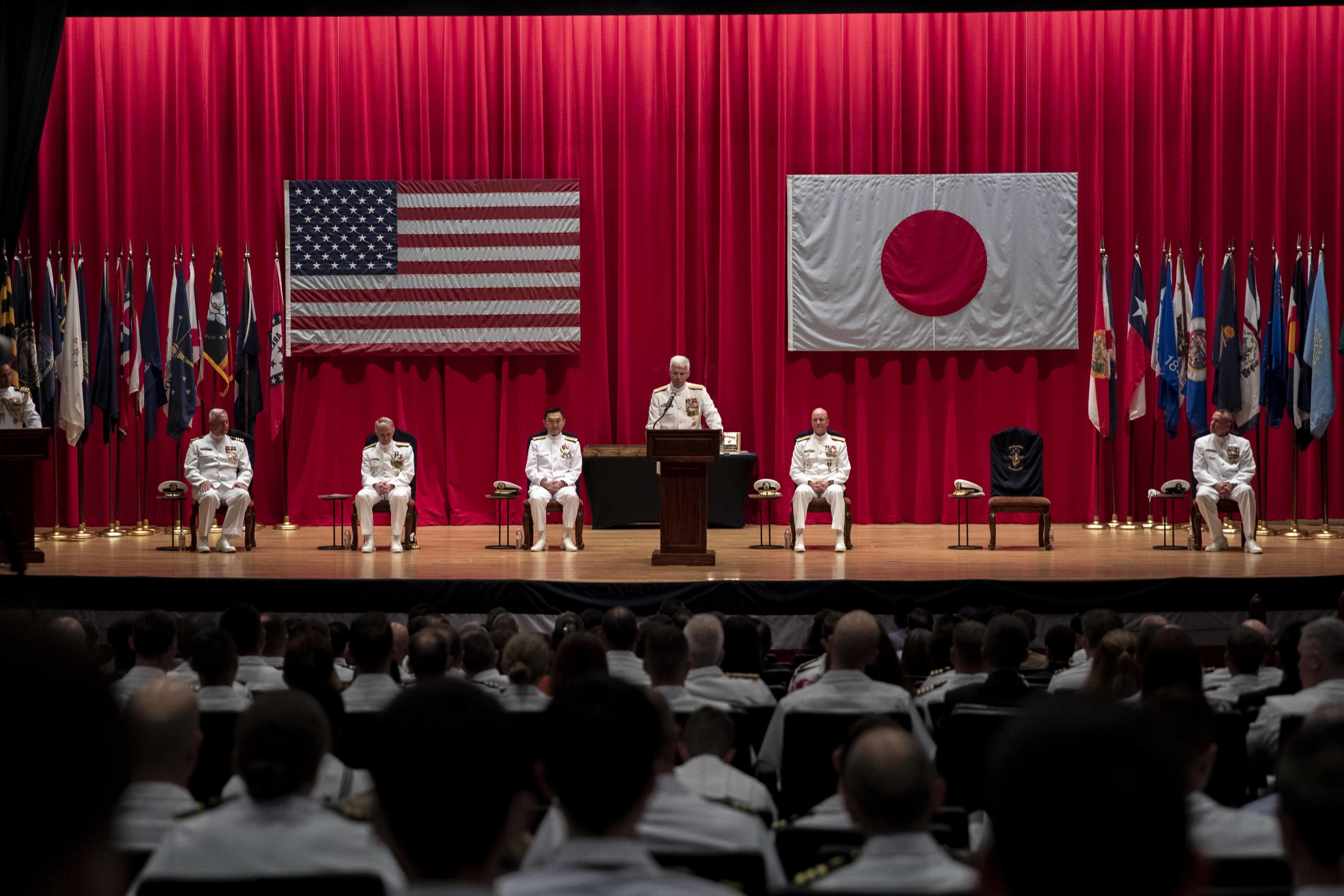
At the change of command ceremony in 2018

U.S. Navy Capt. Karl O. Thomas, right foreground, the commanding officer of the aircraft carrier USS Abraham Lincoln (CVN 72), speaks with an attendee during a Veterans Day ceremony, 8 November 2013

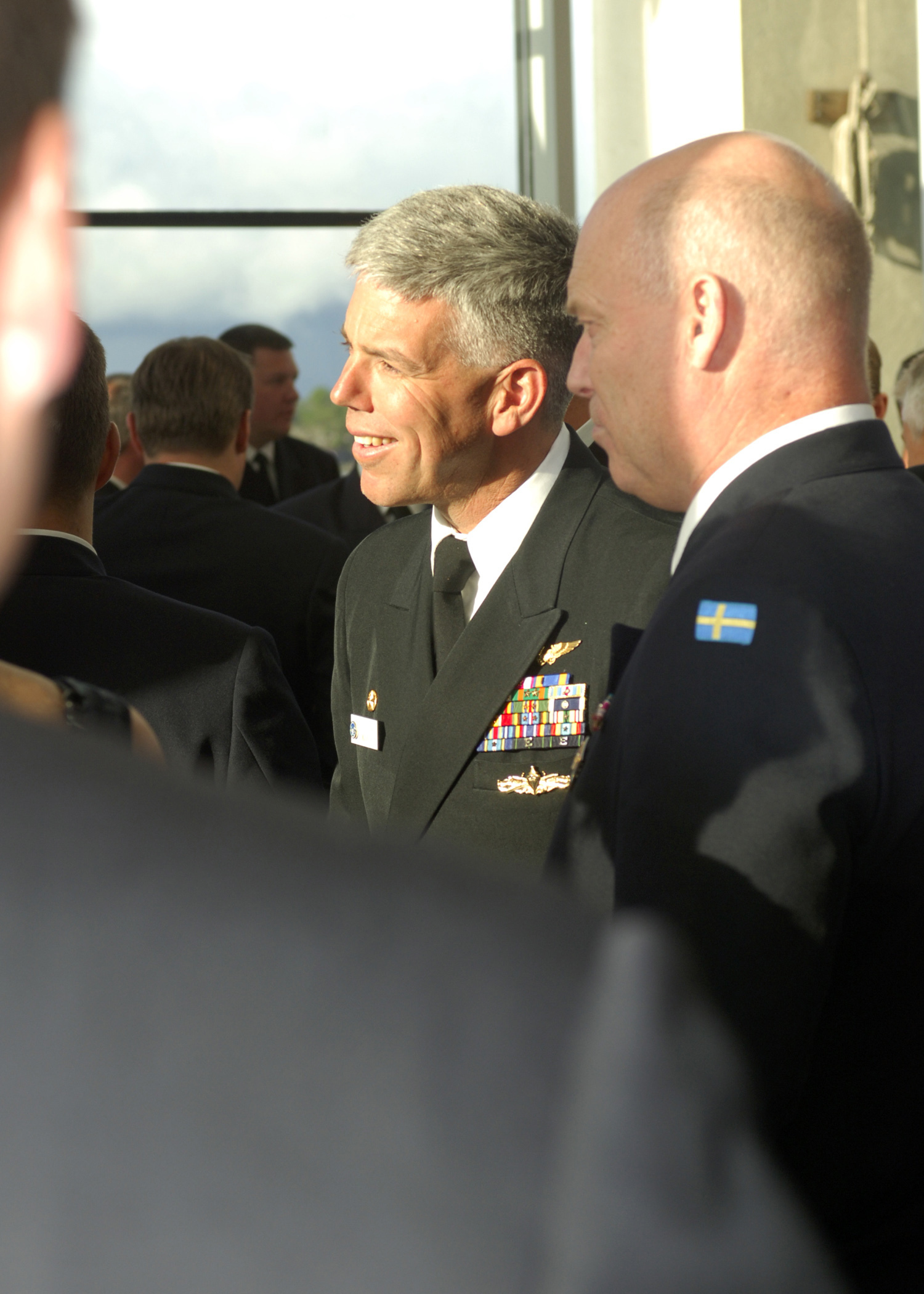
With Swedish Admiral who hosted Baltic Operations Exercise 2009 Leadership in Karlskrona

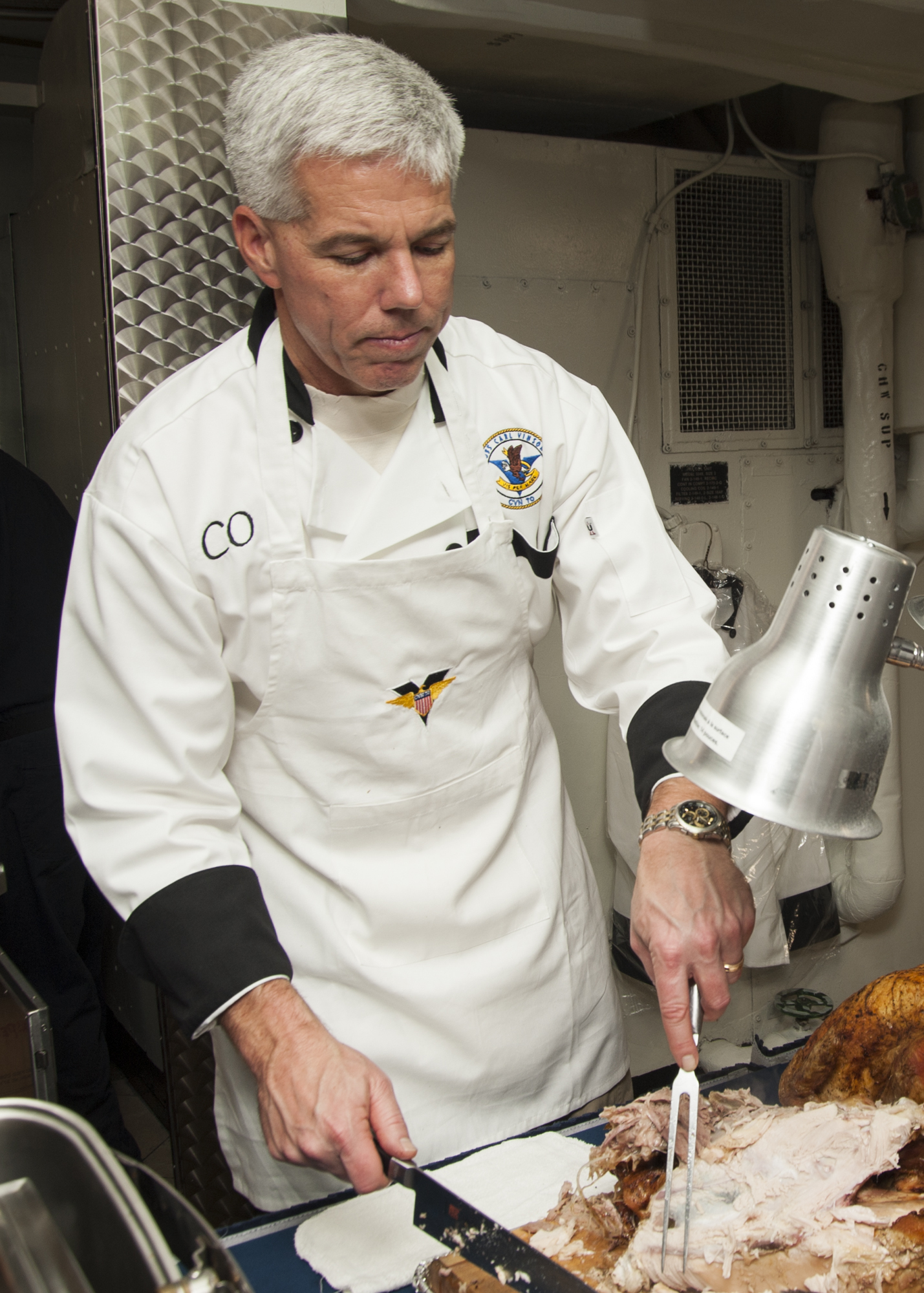
Capt. Karl Thomas, commanding officer of the Nimitz-class aircraft carrier USS Carl Vinson, serves food on the mess decks during Thanksgiving dinner on 27 November 2014. Carl Vinson was deployed in the U.S. 5th Fleet area of responsibility supporting Operation Inherent Resolve, strike operations in Iraq and Syria as directed, maritime security operations, and theater security cooperation efforts in the region

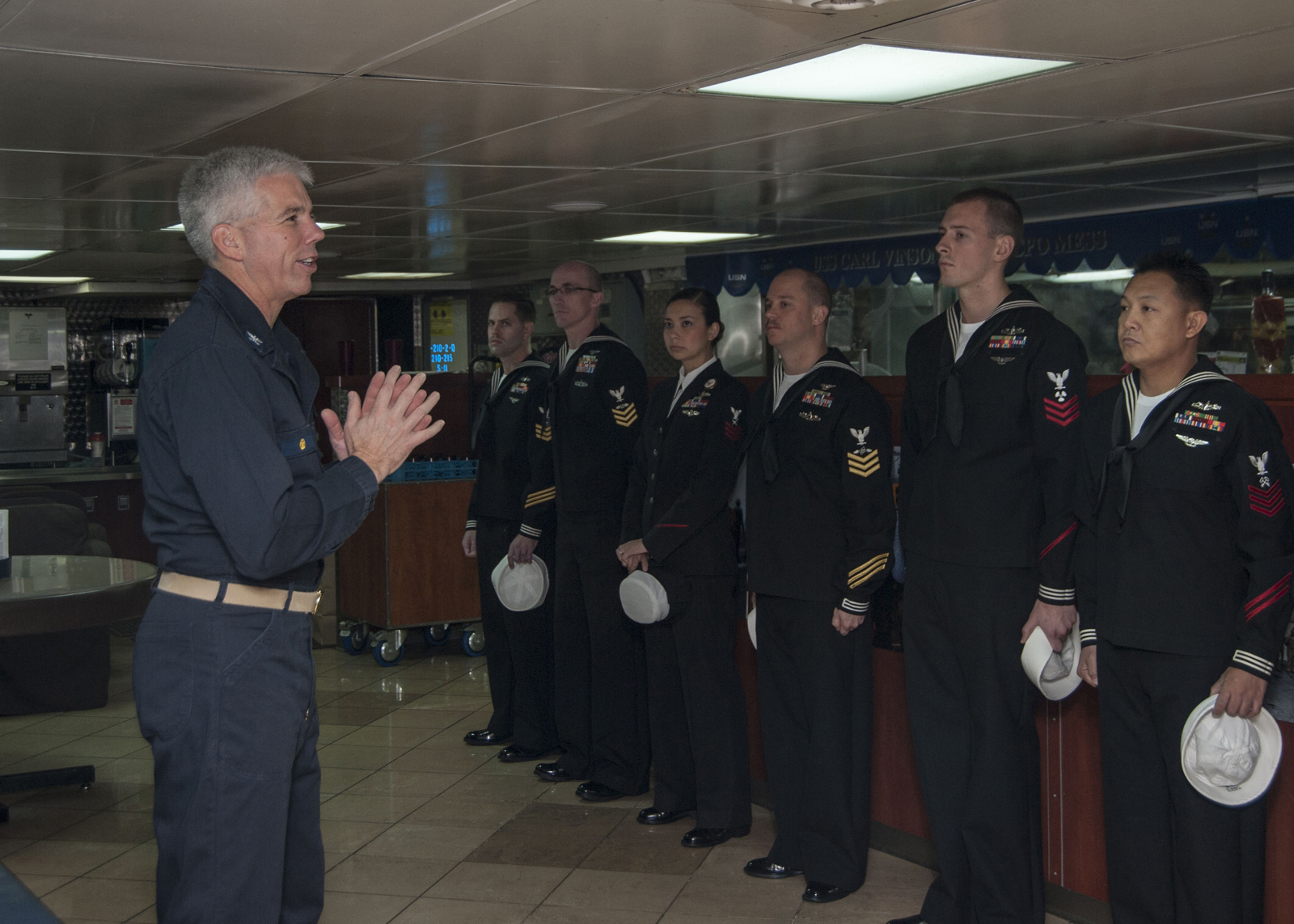
Capt. Karl Thomas, commanding officer of the Nimitz-class aircraft carrier USS Carl Vinson, addresses Sailor of the Year candidates in the Chief’s Mess.

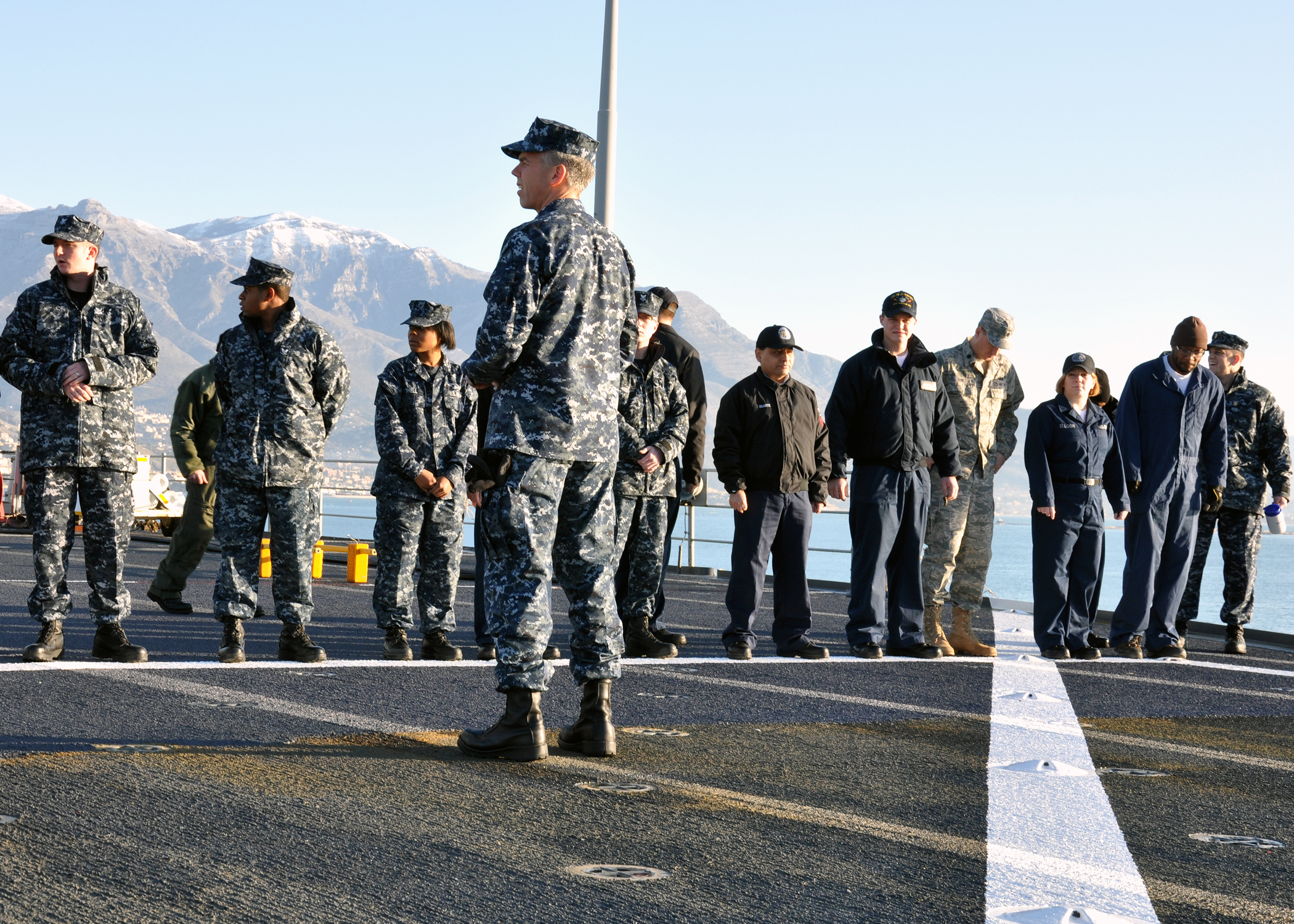
Capt. Karl O. Thomas, commanding officer of USS Mount Whitney, leads Sailors, civilian mariners, and embarked U.S. 6th fleet staff members to conduct a foreign object debris walk down on the flight deck prior to the ship getting underway for flight quarters on 1 February 2010. Mount Whitney is the U.S. Sixth Fleet's flagship. It is home-ported in Gaeta, Italy, and operates with a hybrid crew of U.S. Sailors and Military Sealift Command civilian mariners.

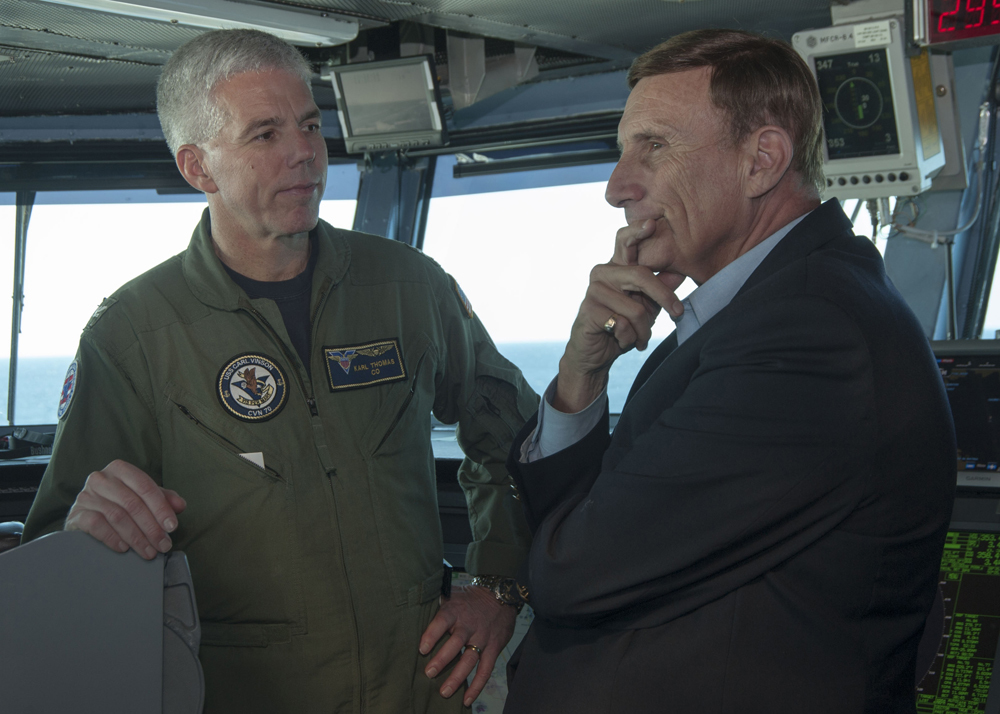
Capt. Karl Thomas, commanding officer of the Nimitz-class aircraft carrier USS Carl Vinson, speaks with U.S. Rep. John Mica, from Florida, in the navigation bridge aboard the Nimitz-class aircraft carrier USS Carl Vinson on 22 October 2014. Carl Vinson and its embarked air wing, Carrier Air Wing 17, are deployed in the U.S. 5th Fleet area of operations supporting Operation Inherent Resolve, strike operations in Iraq and Syria as directed, maritime security operations, and theater security cooperation efforts in the region.

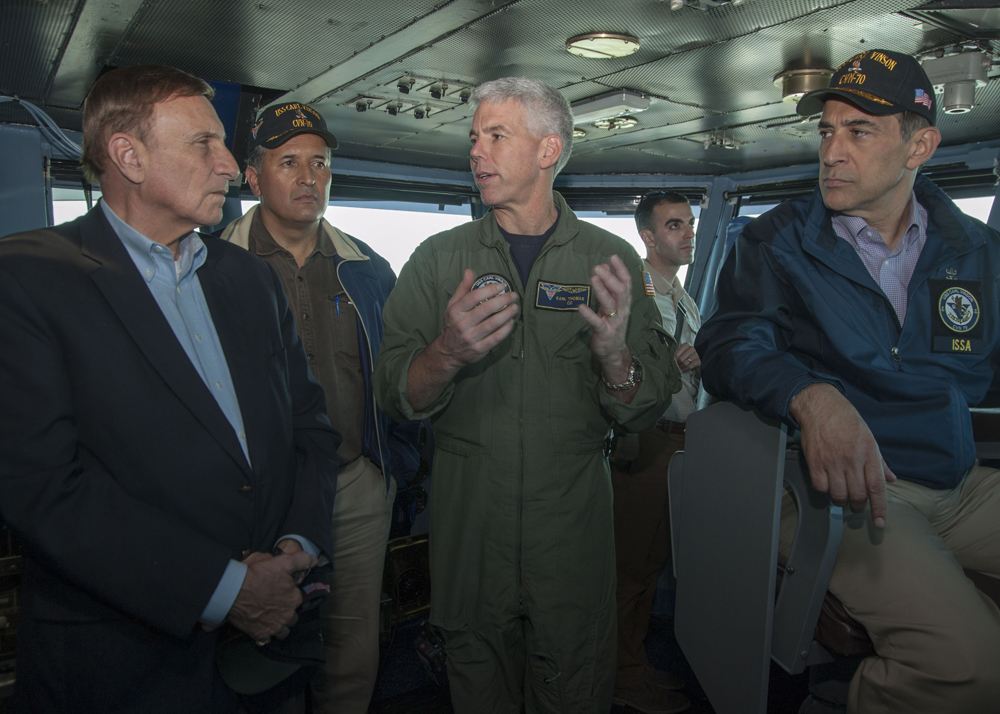
Capt. Karl Thomas, commanding officer of the Nimitz-class aircraft carrier USS Carl Vinson, speaks on 22 October 2014 with U.S. Representatives John Mica, left, from Florida, Juan Vargas, middle, and Darrell Issa, seated, from California, on the navigation bridge. Carl Vinson and its embarked air wing, Carrier Air Wing 17, are deployed in the U.S. 5th Fleet area of operations supporting Operation Inherent Resolve, strike operations in Iraq and Syria as directed, maritime security operations, and theater security cooperation efforts in the region.

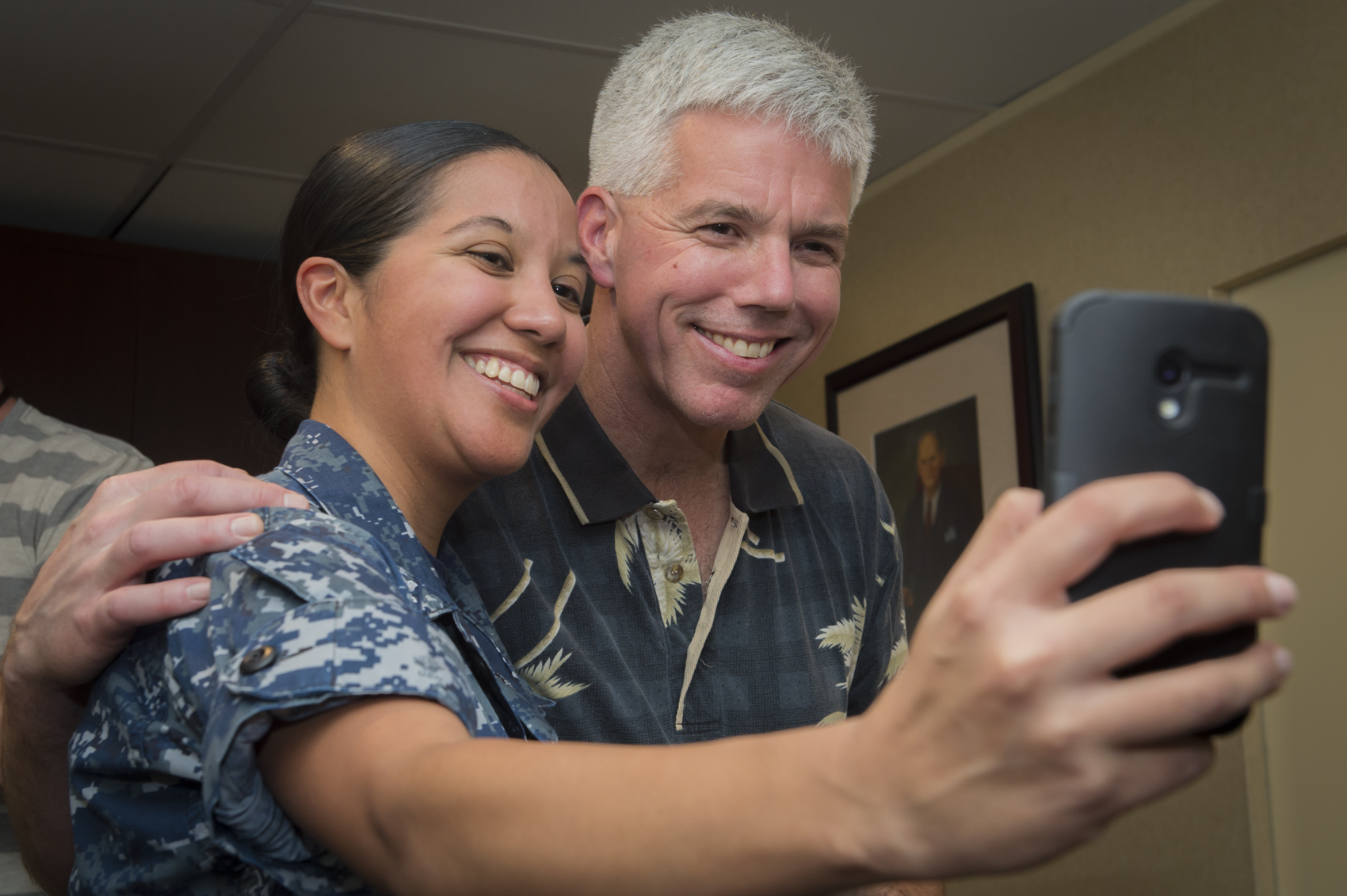
ABU DHABI Air Traffic Controller 2nd Class Samantha Kelly, left, takes a “selfie” with Capt. Karl Thomas, commanding officer of aircraft carrier USS Carl Vinson, in the ship’s in-port cabin on 25 February 2015. Carl Vinson is deployed in the U.S. 5th Fleet area of operations supporting Operation Inherent Resolve, strike operations in Iraq and Syria as directed, maritime security operations, and theater security cooperation efforts in the region.

Military offices
Preceded by Marc H. Dalton	Commander of Carrier Strike Group 5; 2018–2019	Succeeded by George Wikoff
Preceded by William R. Merz	Commander of the United States Seventh Fleet; 2021–2024	Succeeded by Fred Kacher
Preceded by Steve Parode; Acting	Deputy Chief of Naval Operations for Information Warfare and Director of Naval Intelligence of the United States Navy; 2024–2025	Vacant
Preceded by John Gumbleton; Acting	Commander of the United States Fleet Forces Command; 2025–present	Incumbent
