= Marc H. Dalton =

U.S. Navy admiral (born 1965)

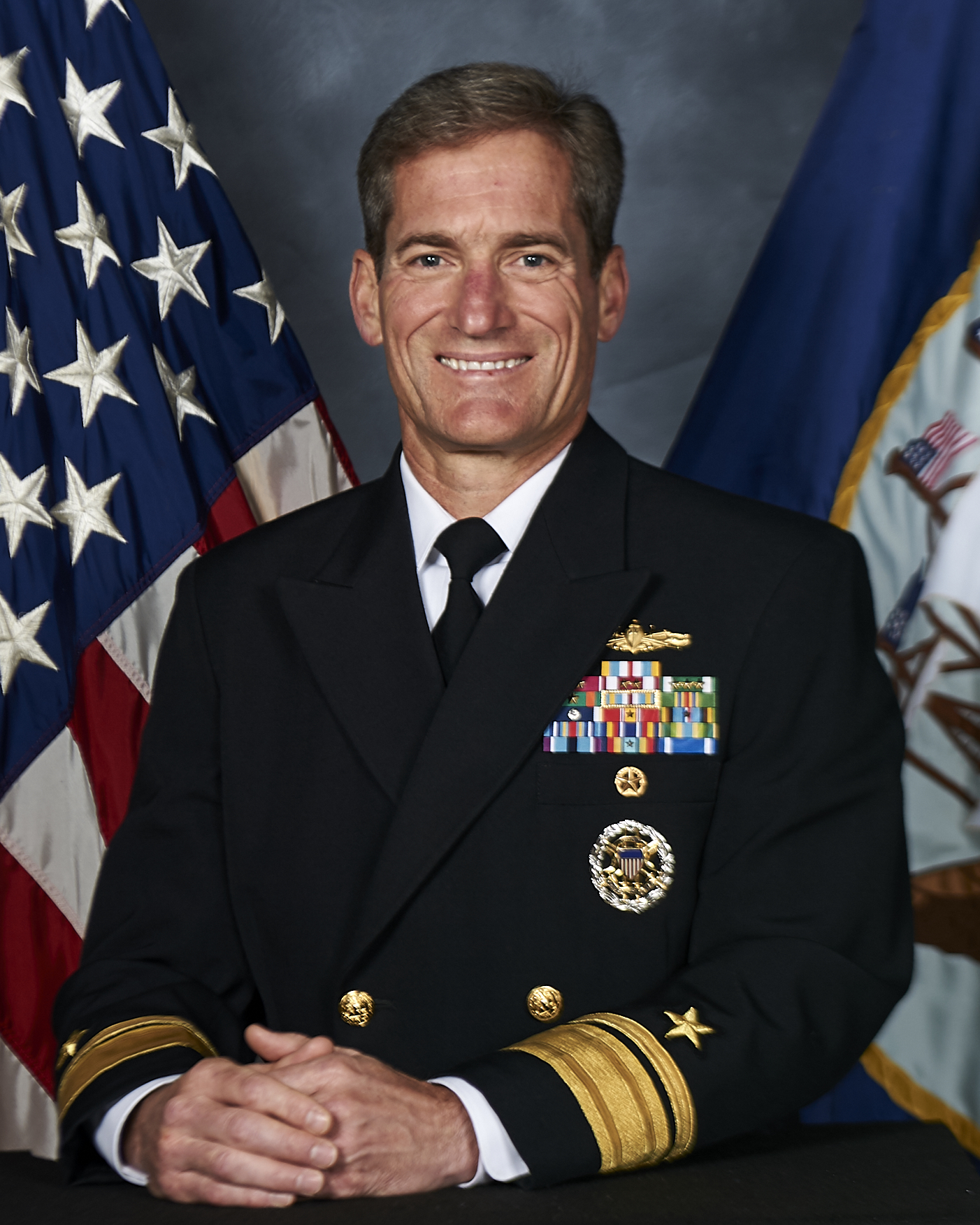
- Official portrait, 2018
- Born: 1965 (age 60–61); California, U.S.
- Military career
- Allegiance: United States
- Branch: United States Navy
- Service years: 1987–2021
- Rank: Rear Admiral
- Commands: Carrier Strike Group 5 Task Force 76; Cruiser-Destroyer Group 1 Destroyer Squadron 21; USS Boone
- Awards: Defense Superior Service Medal; Legion of Merit (2)

Marc Henry Dalton (born 1965) is a retired United States Navy rear admiral who last served as the Director of Assessment of the U.S. Navy. Previously, he was Director of Maritime Operations for the United States Pacific Fleet.

Born in California, Dalton is a 1987 graduate of the United States Naval Academy with a Bachelor of Science degree in systems engineering. He later earned a Master of Public Administration degree from the Kennedy School at Harvard University.

Military offices
Preceded by Hugh D. Wetherald	Commander of Task Force 76; 2016–2017	Succeeded by Marvin Thompson
Preceded by Charles Williams	Commander of Carrier Strike Group 5; 2017–2018	Succeeded by Karl O. Thomas
