= Terry Kraft =

Retired United States admiral (born 1961)

Terry B. Kraft
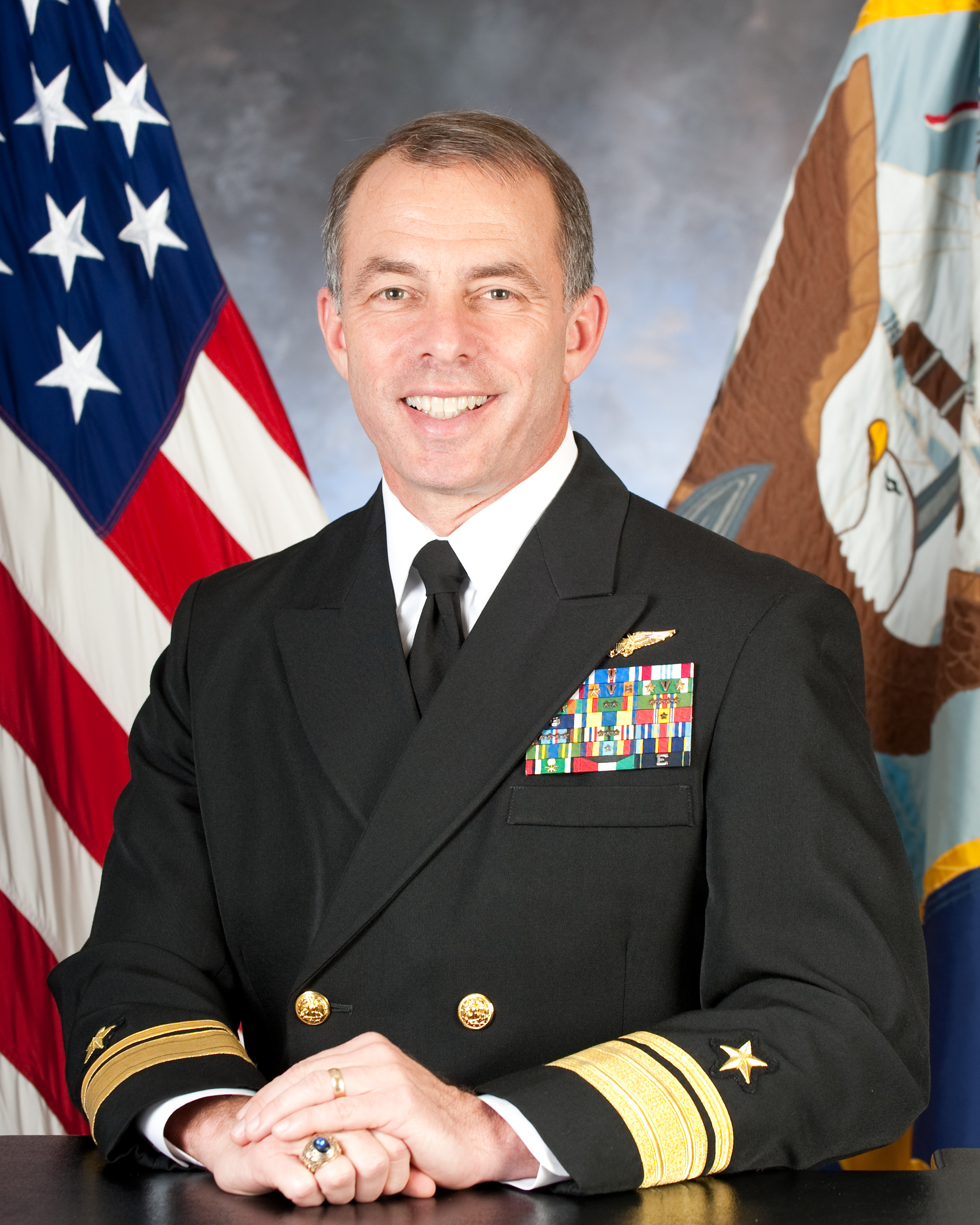
- Born: December 15, 1961 (age 64); San Diego, California, United States of America
- Military career
- Allegiance: United States
- Branch: United States Navy
- Rank: Rear Admiral
- Commands: U.S. Naval Forces Japan; Electronic Attack Squadron 131 (VAQ-131); USS Shreveport (LPD-12); USS Ronald Reagan (CVN-76)

Terry B. Kraft is a retired Rear Admiral of the United States Navy, formerly commanding the U.S. Naval Forces Japan. He is a Naval Flight Officer whose previous commands include Electronic Attack Squadron 131 (VAQ-131), USS Shreveport (LPD-12), and USS Ronald Reagan (CVN-76). He was one of several senior officers implicated in the Fat Leonard scandal.

== Education ==
Kraft is a 1981 graduate of the United States Naval Academy; he earned a master's degree in political science from Auburn University and is a graduate of the Navy Nuclear Power School. He was a federal executive fellow at John F. Kennedy School of Government at Harvard University (1999–2000).

== Career ==
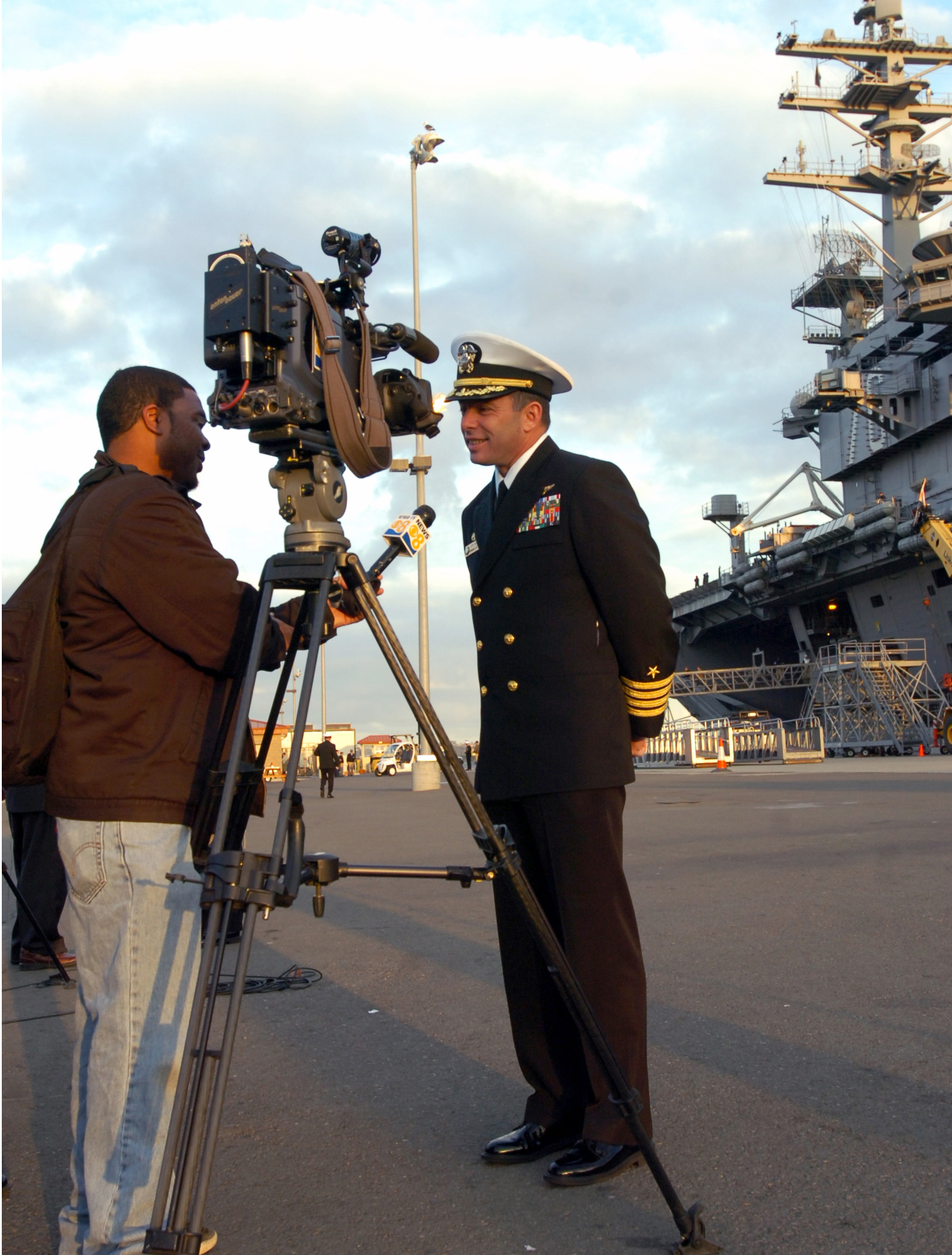
Kraft, commanding officer of USS Ronald Reagan, interviewed in January 2007

Kraft's sea duty tours include the following:

- Attack Squadron (VA) 55 embarked in USS Coral Sea (CV-43),
- VA-115 embarked in USS Midway (CV-41), and
- VA-95 embarked in USS Abraham Lincoln (CVN-72).

He also served as executive officer on USS Theodore Roosevelt (CVN-71). During those tours, he participated in Operations El Dorado Canyon, Desert Storm, Iraqi Freedom (OIF) and Enduring Freedom (OEF).

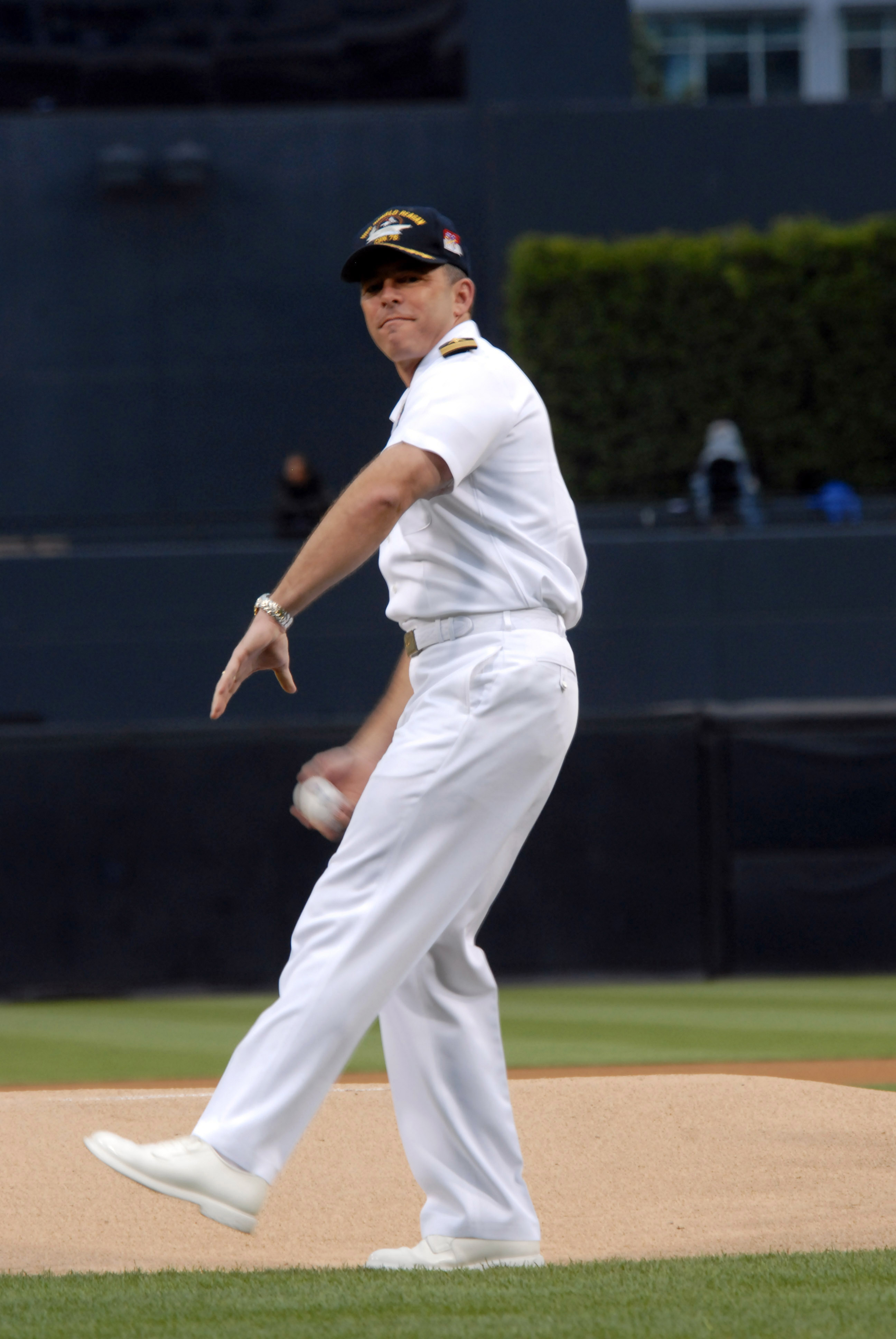
Kraft, as commanding officer of USS Ronald Reagan, throws out the ceremonial first pitch prior to a May 2007 San Diego Padres baseball game honoring the ship.

Kraft commanded Electronic Attack Squadron 131, Amphibious Transport Dock USS Shreveport (LPD-12), the aircraft carrier USS Ronald Reagan (CVN-76), and the Enterprise Carrier Strike Group (CSG-12). He participated in both OIF and OEF during all four tours. He assumed command of Navy Warfare Development Command in October 2011.

Shore tours for Kraft have included duty in VA-128, Air Command and Staff College, Current Operations Directorate (J31), U.S. Pacific Command, and the John F. Kennedy School of Government, Cambridge, Massachusetts. After flag selection, he reported to the Pentagon, Chief of Naval Operations staff, first in N88 as head of Maritime Aviation, Unmanned Aerial Systems and Aviation Training Plans and Programs, then in N2/N6 as director, ISR Capabilities.

Kraft had over 3700 hours and 1000 carrier arrested landings in the A-6E, EA-6B and F/A-18F aircraft.

== Corruption scandal ==
Kraft was implicated in a wide-ranging corruption scandal known as the "Fat Leonard scandal." Kraft and other high-ranking officials were censured for their conduct during the 2006 deployment of the USS Ronald Reagan. The Navy said the officers showed "very poor judgement and leadership regarding [their] relationship with Mr. Leonard Francis, the president of Glenn Defense Marine Asia." Further statements from the Navy stated that Kraft merely underpaid after attending dinner parties. Although the Navy eventually referred the cases to the Justice Department, legal action was not pursued due to the statute of limitations.

== Retirement ==
In July 2015, he was forced to retire after 34 years of service.

After retiring from the Navy, Kraft worked at General Atomics from 2015 to 2023 in senior leadership and management positions. As of 2023, he is the CEO of the USS Midway Museum.

== Awards and decorations ==
As of 2015, Kraft is authorized to wear the Legion of Merit with four gold stars, Distinguished Flying Cross (with combat V), the Defense Meritorious Service Medal, the Meritorious Service Medal with two gold stars and multiple individual and strike-flight Air Medals.
