= Bruce Loveless =

United States Rear Admiral

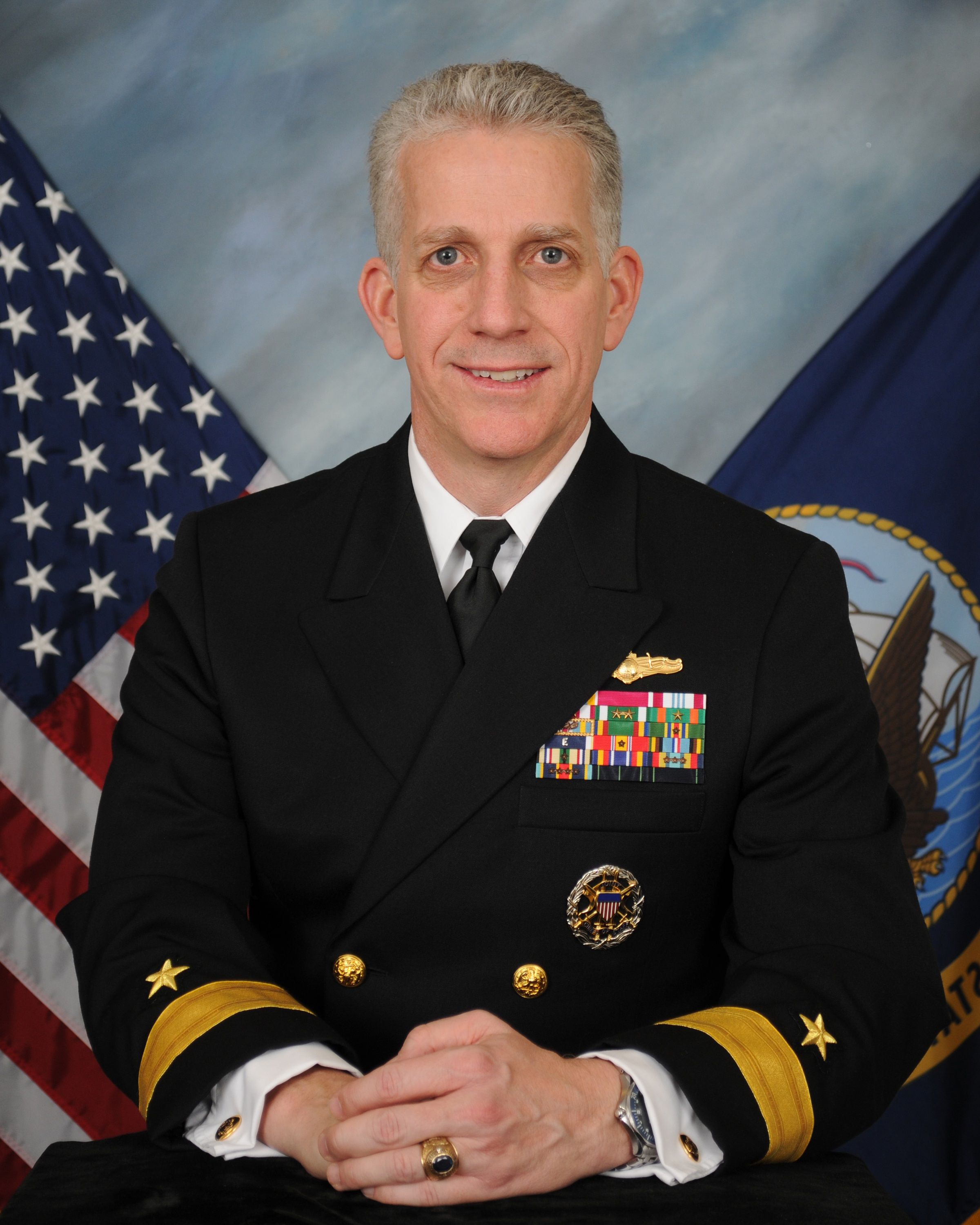
- Born: November 13, 1963 (age 62); Chicago, Illinois
- Military career
- Allegiance: USA
- Branch: United States Navy
- Service years: 1982-2016
- Rank: Rear Admiral
- Commands: Director of Intelligence Operations, U.S. Navy
- Conflicts: Operation Southern Watch; Operation Desert Storm; Operation Desert Shield; Operation Enduring Freedom; Operation United Shield

Bruce Loveless is a retired Rear Admiral in the United States Navy. His last Naval position was Corporate Director for Information Warfare. He was one of several senior officers implicated in the Fat Leonard scandal; all charges against him were ultimately dismissed.

== Education ==
- Bachelor of Science, United States Naval Academy, 1986
- PhD, Leadership Studies, University of San Diego, 2021

== Military career ==
Loveless served as air intelligence officer for Tactical Air Control Squadron 21 deploying to the Mediterranean Sea in USS Iwo Jima (LPH 2); staff intelligence officer for U.S. Naval Forces Central Command and U.S. 5th Fleet, forward-deployed to Manama, Bahrain, participating in Operations Desert Storm, Desert Strike, Southern Watch, Vigilant Sentinel, and Vigilant Warrior in Iraq, and United Shield in Somalia; assistant intelligence officer for Carrier Group Four and NATO Striking Force Atlantic, sailing the Western Atlantic and Caribbean Sea in each U.S. Atlantic Fleet aircraft carrier and USS Mount Whitney (LCC 20); assistant chief of staff for Intelligence (N2) for Carrier Strike Group Five, Battle Force Seventh Fleet (CTF 70), and U.S. Seventh Fleet, forward-deployed to Yokosuka, Japan, sailing the Western Pacific and Indian Ocean in USS Kitty Hawk (CV 63) and USS Blue Ridge (LCC 19); and director of Intelligence (J2) for Joint Task Force 515 participating in Operation Enduring Freedom – The Philippines (OEF-P).

Ashore, he served at the Navy Operational Intelligence Center in Suitland, Md., and with the Joint Chiefs of Staff (JCS J2) and Director of Naval Intelligence (OPNAV N2) at the Pentagon. He commanded U.S. Pacific Command's Joint Intelligence Operations Center (PACOM JIOC), Pearl Harbor from 2009 to 2012.

== Corruption scandal ==
On 8 November 2013, the Navy temporarily relieved Loveless of his duties and suspended his security clearance in connection with an DCIS bribery investigation involving Singapore-based defense contractor Glenn Defense Marine Asia.

In 2016, it was reported that both Loveless and Branch were still functioning in their roles, yet were "barred from reading, seeing or hearing classified information since November 2013", due to the suspension tied to the investigation.

He was arrested in March 2017 following his indictment for corruption by the U.S. attorney's office in San Diego for taking bribes from Leonard Glenn "Fat Leonard" Francis, a Singapore-based defense contractor who has already pleaded guilty to defrauding the Navy of tens of millions of dollars.

A federal judge dismissed all charges against Admiral Loveless on September 15, 2022 after the jury overseeing the case hung. Four other, lower ranking military members who went on trial with Loveless were convicted. Loveless's attorneys put out a statement saying Loveless had been "completely vindicated" by the decision.

== Retirement ==
Loveless retired in October 2016 after 34 years of service.

== See also ==
- Information Dominance Corps § Community management
