= RFA Sir Lancelot =

Lead ship of Round Table-class landing ship logistics of the Royal Fleet Auxiliary

- RFA Sir Lancelot. San Carlos Water. 1982

History

United Kingdom
- Name: Sir Lancelot
- Namesake: Lancelot
- Operator: British-India Steam Navigation Company (1964-1970); Royal Fleet Auxiliary (1970-1989)
- Ordered: December 1961
- Builder: Fairfield S&E
- Laid down: March 1962
- Launched: 25 June 1963
- Commissioned: 16 January 1964
- Decommissioned: 31 March 1989
- Identification: IMO number: 5413642
- Fate: Sold commercially, June 1989

History

South Africa
- Name: Lowland Lancer
- Owner: Lowline
- Identification: IMO number: 5413642
- Fate: Sold to Republic of Singapore Navy, 1992

History

Singapore
- Name: RSS Perseverance
- Owner: Republic of Singapore Navy
- Acquired: 1992
- Commissioned: 5 May 1994
- Decommissioned: 2003
- Identification: L-206 IMO number: 5413642
- Fate: Sold commercially
- Notes: Used as a submarine tender

History

Singapore
- Name: Glenn Braveheart
- Owner: Glenn Defense Marine Asia
- Acquired: 2003
- Identification: IMO number: 5413642
- Fate: Scrapped 2008

General characteristics as Sir Lancelot
- Class & type: Round Table class LSL (prototype)
- Displacement: 3,370 tons standard; 5,550 tons fully loaded
- Length: 412 ft (126 m)
- Beam: 60 ft (18 m)
- Draught: 13 ft (4.0 m)
- Propulsion: 2 Denny Sulzer (later B&W) diesels.; Power: 9,520 bhp (7,099 kW)
- Speed: 17 knots (31 km/h; 20 mph)
- Range: 9,200 nautical miles (17,000 km; 10,600 mi) at 15 knots (28 km/h; 17 mph)
- Capacity: 2,180 tons
- Complement: 68 crew, up to 340 passengers
- Armament: 2 x 40 mm Bofors guns
- Aircraft carried: Up to 20 Wessex helicopters (1973)

RFA Sir Lancelot (L3029) was the lead ship and prototype of the Round Table class landing ship logistics, an amphibious warfare design operated by the British Armed Forces.

Sir Lancelot sailed with the British Task Force that took part in the Falklands War. Whilst in San Carlos Water, an Argentine plane dropped a bomb that penetrated her hull, but the bomb failed to explode.

== Design and construction ==
Constructed by Fairfield S&E, the vessel was laid down in March 1962, launched on 25 June 1963, and commissioned on 16 January 1964. As the first of the Round Table class, it also became known as Sir Lancelot class.

== Background ==
The ship was initially operated by the British-India Steam Navigation Company, then was transferred to the Royal Fleet Auxiliary in 1970. Round Table class ships were crewed by British officers and Hong Kong Chinese sailors from their introduction in 1963 until 1989, when Sir Lancelot was the last RFA to be crewed in this way.

== Service in United Kingdom ==
=== 1970s ===
Sailing out of Singapore, Sir Lancelot delivered 300 tons of relief supplies for the victims of the West Malaysian flood, which had been donated by the Government and people of Singapore.

=== Falklands War ===
==== 1980s ====
In 1982, as part of the Amphibious Task Group engaged in the Falklands War, she entered San Carlos Water on 21 May and uniquely remained there for the duration of the conflict. On 24 May at around 10:15, she was hit by a 1,000 lb (450 kg) bomb, which failed to explode, from one of four Argentinian Air Force A-4 Skyhawks. This bomb penetrated the starboard side of the ship and she was temporarily evacuated for eight days, pending its removal. This was effected by a team of Clearance Divers from Fleet Team Three and took 22 hours of straight work to achieve. The 1,000lb bomb was removed with the fuse still intact and 'live' in a protracted and delicate operation that required the removal of an entire sleeping-cabin from the deck above to allow egress of the weapon via chain hoists, sheer-legs and '...a very long piece of rope' - with which it was lowered to the sea-bed. For this operation the Team received one Distinguished Service Medal, two Mentions in Dispatches and four C in C's Commendations for Brave Conduct. ("Keep Your Head Down" by Commander 'Bernie' Bruen MBE DSC RN, Commanding Officer FCDT3) The crew were transferred initially to Red Beach, then RFA Stromness the next day, and RFA Sir Tristram a day later. Thereafter she remained in San Carlos Water providing accommodation and base facilities to a variety of military units.

Following the cessation of hostilities and some repairs, she operated around the Falklands until 26 July, returning to Portsmouth on 18 August, and dumping 25 tons of Argentine munitions into the ocean en route.

== Service in South Africa ==
Sir Lancelot was decommissioned on 31 March 1989, and sold in June 1989 to the British company Lowline, which renamed the vessel Lowland Lancer. She initially operated as a cross-channel ferry on the Weymouth, Dorset to Cherbourg route. This was followed by a spell as the replacement Royal Mail ship while RMS St Helena was undergoing repairs. On arrival in Cape Town, the vessel stayed in South Africa and opened as a floating casino.

== Service in Singapore ==
=== 1990s ===
The ship was sold on in 1992 to the Republic of Singapore Navy, was renamed RSS Perseverance (L-206), and was commissioned on 5 May 1994 following a two-year refit. Perseverance was deployed to East Timor as part of the Australian-led INTERFET peacekeeping taskforce from 9 January to 17 February 2000.

=== Glenn Defense ===
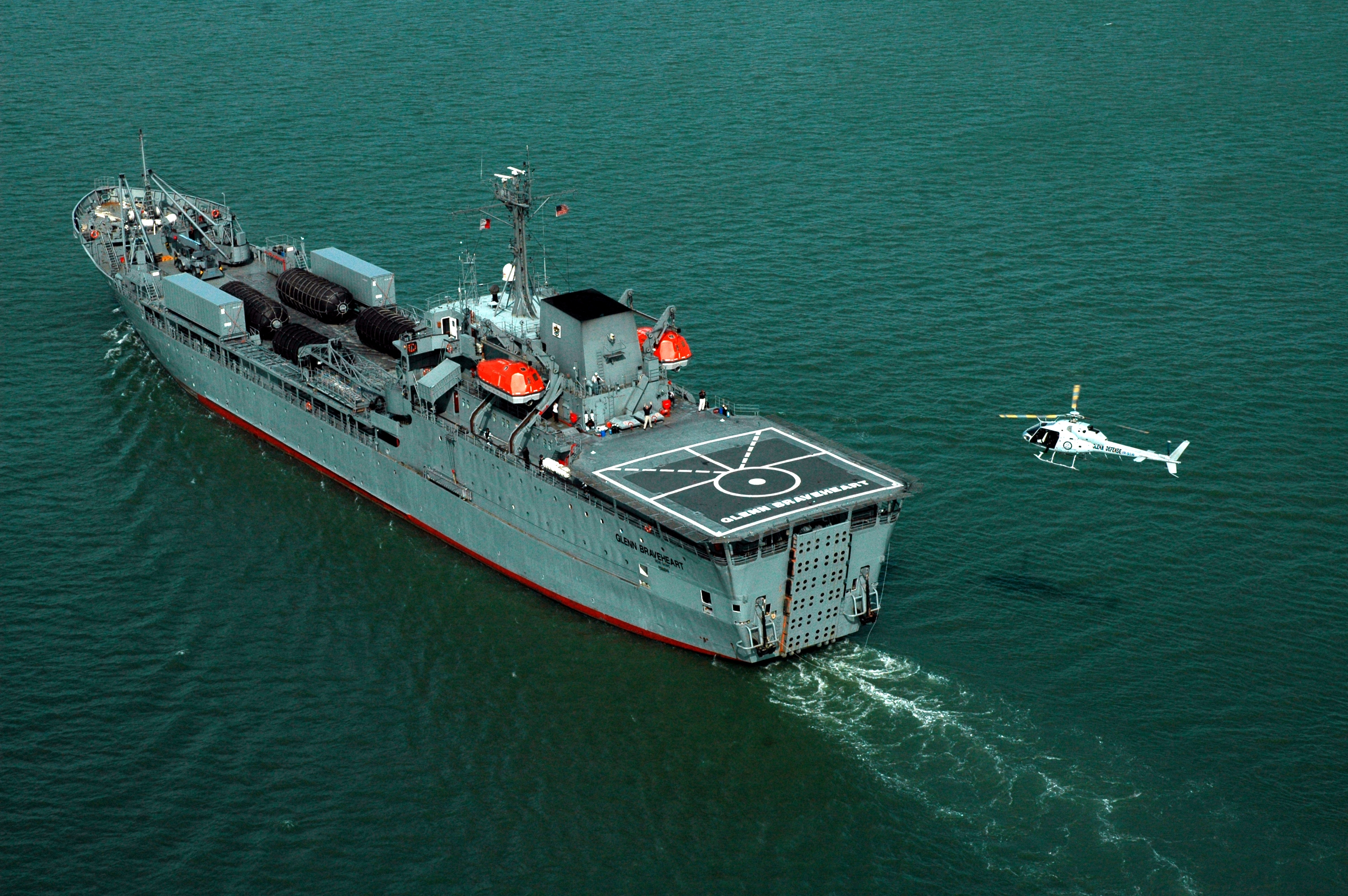
Glenn Braveheart (2005)

In December 2003, the ship was sold to Glenn Defense Marine Asia, which renamed the ship Glenn Braveheart. According to US Court records relating to the extensive corruption scandal and convictions of very senior US Navy officers and other personnel involving bribery, fraud and "Sex-for-secrets" on the part of Glenn Defense relating to the service and resupply of Navy ships at Asian ports, the vessel would often deploy alongside the USS Blue Ridge, the 7th Fleet's flagship. When in port, the Braveheart would serve as "a giant party boat, with prostitutes in the wardroom to entertain US officers."

== Fate ==
In early 2008, the ship was sold for breaking. She was taken to Chittagong, Bangladesh, and beached on 12 March 2008 and broken up for scrap.
