= Director of Naval Intelligence, U.S. Navy =

Head of Naval intelligence within the Naval Staff

United States Navy Director of Naval Intelligence
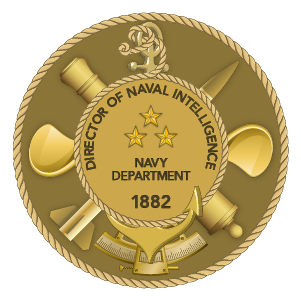

- Flag of a Navy vice admiral

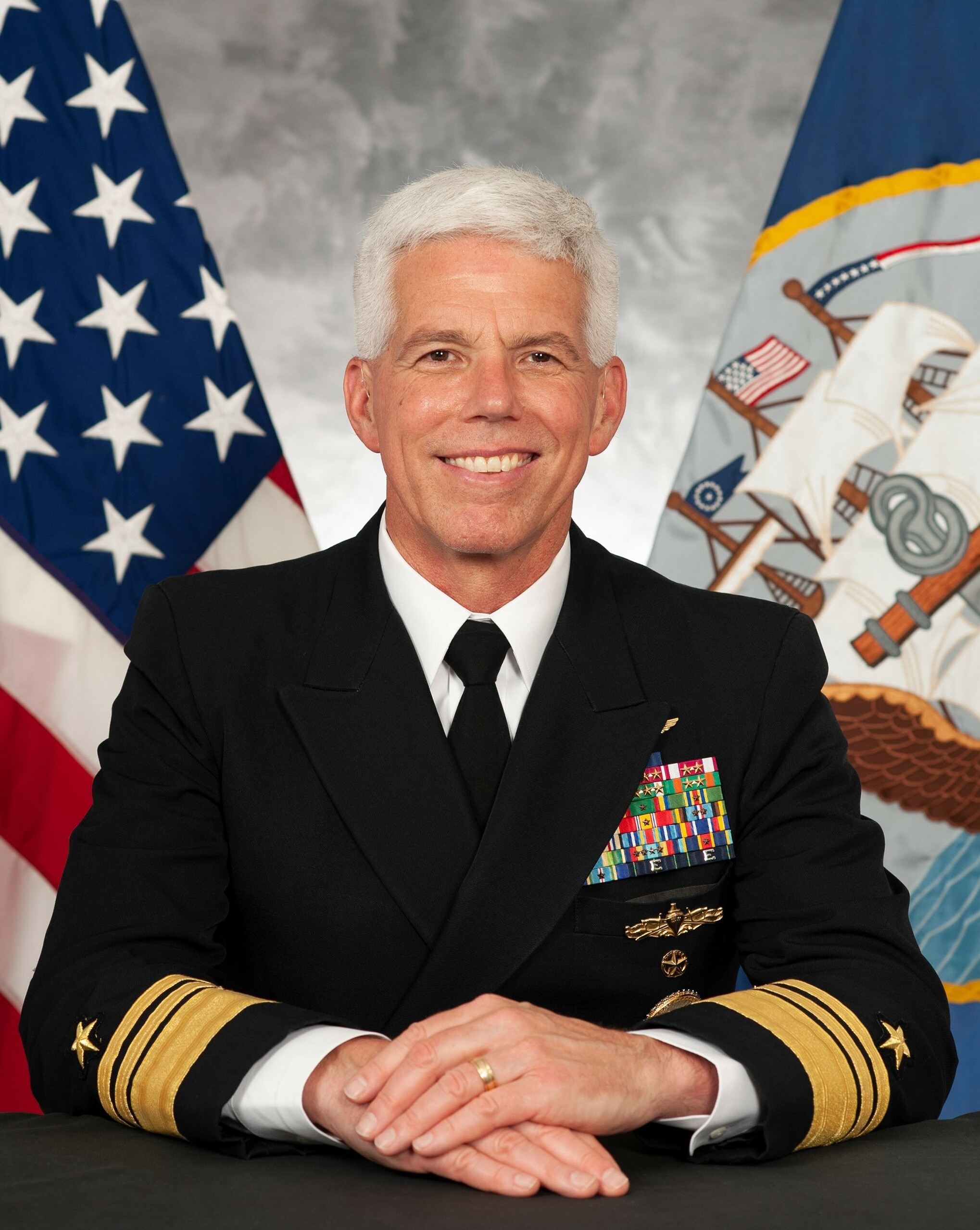
- Incumbent; Vice Admiral Karl O. Thomas since 28 February 2024
- Formation: June 1882
- First holder: LT Theodorus B. M. Mason
- Website: https://www.navy.mil

The director of naval intelligence (DNI) serves as the head of Naval intelligence on the staff of the chief of naval operations of the United States Navy. The director of Naval Intelligence also serves as the deputy chief of naval operations for information warfare (N2/N6) on the staff of the chief of naval operations. The director of naval intelligence is not to be confused with the Office of Naval Intelligence, a Navy Echelon III command that serves as the U.S. Navy's Service Intelligence Center and supports the Office of the Chief of Naval Operations and the director of naval intelligence via the Information Warfare Community.

== Directors of Naval Intelligence from 1882 ==
Note: Prior to 1911 the head of the ONI was known as the Chief Intelligence Officer.

1. Lt. Theodorus B.M. Mason (June 1882 – April 1885)
2. Lt. Raymond P. Rodgers (April 1885 – July 1889)
3. Cmdr. Charles H. Davis, Jr. (September 1889 – August 1892)
4. Cmdr. French E. Chadwick (September 1892 – June 1893)
5. Lt. Frederick Singer (June 1893 – April 1896)
6. Lt. Cmdr. Richard Wainwright (April 1896 – November 1897)
7. Cmdr. Richardson Clover (November 1897 – May 1898)
8. Capt. John R. Bartlett (May 1898 – October 1898)
9. Cmdr. Richardson Clover (reappointed) (October 1898 – February 1900)
10. Capt. Charles D. Sigsbee (February 1900 – April 1903)
11. Cmdr. Seaton Schroeder (May 1903 – April 1906)
12. Capt. Raymond P. Rodgers (reappointed) (April 1906 – May 1909)
13. Capt. Charles E. Vreeland (May 1909 – December 1909)
14. Capt. Templin M. Potts (December 1909 – January 1912)
15. Capt. Thomas S. Rodgers (January 1912 – December 1913)
16. Capt. Henry F. Bryan (December 1913 – January 1914)
17. Capt. James H. Oliver (January 1914 – March 1917)
18. Rear Adm. Roger Welles Jr. (April 1917 – January 1919)
19. Rear Adm. Albert P. Niblack (May 1919 – September 1920)
20. Rear Adm. Andrew T. Long (September 1920 – June 1921)
21. Capt. Luke McNamee (September 1921 – November 1923)
22. Rear Adm. Henry H. Hough (December 1923 – September 1925)
23. Capt. William W. Galbraith (October 1925 – June 1926)
24. Capt. Arthur J. Hepburn (July 1926 – September 1927)
25. Capt. Alfred W. Johnson (December 1927 – June 1930)
26. Capt. Harry A. Baldridge (June 1930 – May 1931
27. Capt. Hayne Ellis (June 1931 – May 1934)
28. Capt. William D. Puleston (June 1934 – April 1937)
29. Rear Adm. Ralston S. Holmes (May 1937 – June 1939)
30. Rear Adm. Walter S. Anderson (June 1939 – January 1941)
31. Capt. Jules James (January 1941 – February 1941)
32. Adm. Alan G. Kirk (March 1941 – October 1941)
33. Rear Adm. Theodore S. Wilkinson (October 1941 – July 1942)
34. Rear Adm. Harold C. Train (July 1942 – September 1943)
35. Rear Adm. Roscoe E. Schuirmann September 1943 – October 1944)
36. Rear Adm. Leo Hewlett Thebaud (October 1944 – September 1945)
37. Rear Adm. Thomas B. Inglis (September 1945 – September 1949)
38. Rear Adm. Felix L. Johnson (September 1949 – June 1952)
39. Rear Adm. Richard F. Stout (July 1952 – November 1952)
40. Rear Adm. Carl F. Espe (December 1952 – May 1956)
41. Rear Adm. Laurence H. Frost (June 1956 – September 1960)
42. Rear Adm. Vernon L. Lowrance (September 1960 – June 1963)
43. Rear Adm. Rufus L. Taylor (June 1963 – May 1966)
44. Capt. Maurice H. Rindskopf (May 1966 – July 1966)
45. Rear Adm. Eugene B. Fluckey (July 1966 – June 1968)
46. Capt. Frank M. Murphy (June 1968 – August 1968)
47. Rear Adm. Frederick J. Harlfinger II (August 1968 – July 1971)
48. Vice Adm. Earl F. Rectanus (July 1971 – September 1974)
49. Rear Adm. Bobby Ray Inman (September 1974 – July 1976)
50. Rear Adm. Donald P. Harvey (July 1976 – August 1978)
51. Rear Adm. Sumner Shapiro (August 1978 – August 1982)
52. Rear Adm. John L. Butts (August 1982 – September 1985)
53. Rear Adm. William O. Studeman (September 1985 – July 1988)
54. Rear Adm. Thomas A. Brooks (July 1988 – August 1991)
55. Rear Adm. Edward D. Sheafer, Jr. (August 1991 – September 1994)
56. Rear Adm. Michael W. Cramer (September 1994 – May 1997)
57. Mr. Paul Lowell (Acting) (May 1997 – November 1997)
58. Rear Adm. Lowell E. Jacoby (November 1997 – June 1999)
59. Rear Adm. Perry M. Ratliff (June 1999 – March 2000)
60. Rear Adm. Richard B. Porterfield (August 2000 – April 2005)
61. Rear Adm. Robert B. Murrett (April 2005 – July 2006)
62. Rear Adm. Tony L. Cothron (July 2006 – July 2008)
63. Vice Adm. David J. Dorsett (July 2008 – June 2011)
64. Vice Adm. Kendall L. Card (June 2011 – July 2013)
65. Vice Adm. Ted N. Branch (July 2013 – July 2016)
66. Vice Adm. Jan E. Tighe (July 2016 - January 2018)
67. Vice Adm. Matthew J. Kohler (January 2018 - June 2020)
68. Vice Adm. Jeffrey E. Trussler (June 2020 - August 2023)
69. Hon. Scott Bray (Acting) (August 2023 - December 2023)
70. Rear Adm. Steve Parode (Acting) (December 2023 - February 2024)
71. Vice Adm. Karl O. Thomas (February 2024 - present)
