= Fat Leonard scandal =

2000s-2010s U.S. Navy corruption scandal

The Fat Leonard scandal is an ongoing investigation and prosecution of corruption within the United States Navy during the 2000s and 2010s. It is focused on the activities of ship support contractor Glenn Defense Marine Asia (GDMA), a Thai subsidiary of the Glenn Marine Group. The Washington Post called the scandal "perhaps the worst national-security breach of its kind to hit the Navy since the end of the Cold War." The company's chief executive, president, and chairman, Malaysian national Leonard Glenn Francis ("Fat Leonard"), bribed a large number of uniformed officers of the United States Seventh Fleet with at least a half million dollars in cash, plus travel expenses, luxury items, parties and prostitutes, in return for classified material. The classified information included the movements of U.S. ships and submarines, confidential contracting information, and details about active law enforcement investigations into Glenn Defense Marine Asia.

Francis, who is of mixed European and South Asian descent, then "exploited the intelligence for illicit profit, brazenly ordering his moles to redirect aircraft carriers, ships and subs to ports he controlled in Southeast Asia so he could more easily bilk the Navy for fuel, tugboats, barges, food, water and sewage removal." The Navy, through GDMA, even employed divers to search harbors for explosives. He also directed them to author "Bravo Zulu" memos, which is an informal term for a letter of commendation from the Navy given to civilians who have performed outstanding services for the Navy, in order to bolster GDMA's credibility for jobs "well done".

The first activities of the conspiracy were confirmed to have occurred in 2006 when Francis recruited numerous Navy personnel to engage in corruption, including directing contracts toward his firm, disfavoring competitors, and inhibiting legitimate fiscal and operational oversight. The initial co-conspirators labeled themselves "the cool kids" and "the wolf pack."

U.S. federal prosecutors filed criminal charges against 33 individuals in connection with the Fat Leonard scandal. Of those, 22 pleaded guilty: Francis himself, four of his top aides, and 17 Navy officials, specifically, at least ten commissioned officers, two petty officers, one former NCIS special agent, and two civilian Navy contracting officials. In 2022, nine others were awaiting trial in U.S. district court in San Diego but all of these cases have since been resolved through plea deals, some due to prosecutorial misconduct. Separately, five Navy officers were charged with crimes under the Uniform Code of Military Justice (UCMJ) and were subject to court-martial proceedings. An additional civilian pleaded guilty to a scandal-related crime in a Singapore court.

Suffering health problems, Francis was hospitalized and released in March 2018. Rather than returning to the custody of the U.S. Marshals Service, he was granted a medical furlough and at first allowed to stay in San Diego at a private residence owned by one of his physicians, under 24-hour surveillance for which his family paid. At a deposition taken in 2018 in the David A. Morales case, Francis said he was being treated for kidney cancer.

On September 4, 2022, Francis escaped home confinement by cutting off his ankle monitor and disappeared. He fled to Mexico, chartered a flight to Cuba, then flew on to Caracas, Venezuela, where he was apprehended, 17 days after beginning his escape, preparing to board a flight to Russia.

In November 2024, Francis was sentenced to 15 years in prison for bribery, fraud, and failure to appear in court. He was also ordered to pay tens of millions of dollars in restitution to the US Navy. He appealed the 15-year sentencing to the United States Court of Appeals for the Ninth Circuit. The Ninth Circuit rejected his appeal on December 18, 2025.

== Initiation and conduct of investigation ==
=== Discounting whistleblower warnings ===
In 2006, Dave Schaus, a Naval officer, became suspicious of GDMA contracts, but Francis was alerted by an informant, Paul Simpkins, to the scrutiny. Simpkins, a decorated veteran of the U.S. Air Force employed as a civilian contracting officer by the Navy in Singapore, managed to quash any inquiry and had Schaus' position eliminated. "What else could I have done to expose this racket?," Schaus asked. Exposed as a whistleblower, he said officers "made my life hell" after discovering he had attempted to initiate an investigation of GDMA.

The Washington Post reported that in 2007, the Navy's Inspector General forwarded a document claiming GDMA was grossly overcharging the Navy for providing port security but the Naval Criminal Investigative Service (NCIS) may have failed to follow up on the warning. According to a senior Navy officer, "Everybody knew that [Glenn Defense] had been under investigation...Everybody also knew that nothing ever happened with those investigations." After that, the Manila NCIS office got an anonymous letter and documents, alleging GDMA had overcharged for fees, armed guards and other services during a Subic Bay, Philippines port visit by the Fred Stockham container support ship. "I hope you share the same concern when reading these documents and take swift action to stamp out this fraud, waste and abuse," the letter said.

Manila's NCIS agents forwarded the paperwork to the Navy's Singapore contracting office, but it had been infiltrated by GDMA's moles, and they claimed the allegations were false, closing the case. Mike Lang, a contracting officer who worked there from 2006 to 2008, said, "They'd always side with Glenn Defense and paint us as troublemakers. They'd say, 'Why are you harassing our contractors? You're making my job hard'."

Two officials from that office, Simpkins and his subordinate, Sharon Gursharan Kaur who was also a civilian Navy contracting officer, as well as a former GDMA employee, were sentenced to six years and 33 months, respectively, with Kaur doing her time in Singapore. NCIS reportedly opened and closed as many as 27 investigations without taking action against GDMA. NCIS failed to provide an explanation for its lack of action in a significant fraud investigation.

=== Tepid responses ===
Documents obtained by The Washington Post via Freedom of Information Act Requests (FOIAs) revealed that after al-Qaeda committed the October 2000 suicide attack on the USS Cole and the September 11, 2001 attacks on the World Trade Center and the Pentagon, the Navy's Economic Crimes unit was reduced from a staff of 140 to only nine persons, most having been reassigned to focus on terrorism. At least 27 separate investigations had been opened, but later closed without action, thanks to the intervention of senior Navy personnel who were in league with Francis.

The lack of enthusiasm for oversight might have been motivated in part by GDMA's demonstrable ability to deliver the sometimes complex level of services the Navy sought. In 2016, Commander Mike Misiewicz, an officer who was later convicted, told Defense News, "He was a crook, but he was our crook." John Hogan, the NCIS executive assistant director for criminal operations, admitted, "In hindsight, maybe we could have dug a little deeper than we did."

Ray Mabus, who was appointed Navy Secretary by President Barack Obama in 2009, admitted his branch was vulnerable to contracting fraud and should have performed better oversight: "I'm not going to defend at all opening and closing 27 cases. Something should have raised a red flag along there somewhere...There were people inside the Navy who were trying to shut this down, who were coming up with reasons not to pursue it." In 2010, a civilian Navy attorney drafted restrictive ethics guidelines for the 7th Fleet. Two admirals friendly to Francis were said to be responsible for seeing that they were delayed and diluted over the next 2 1/2 years, before being implemented.

=== Eventual actions ===
In 2010, Navy officials became suspicious that some of the bills submitted by GDMA from Thailand were padded. The escalating costs prompted the Navy to build a logistics team to keep contracts somewhat in check, but it was frustrated because Francis had a spy, Jose Luis Sanchez, feeding the team's information back to Francis. Sanchez later pleaded guilty to conspiracy and in 2022, awaits sentencing. Despite the increasing awareness that the Navy was being subjected to massive fraud, GDMA was able to contract to deliver $200 million in services in 2011 alone.

After a three-year investigation and having planted false information that their inquiries had been closed, putting Francis off his guard, federal agents lured him to the United States. In September 2013, he was arrested at a San Diego hotel in a sting operation. He pleaded guilty in January 2015 and was awaiting sentencing.

Francis admitted to using his U.S. Navy contacts, including ship captains, to obtain classified information and to defraud the Navy of tens of millions of dollars by having ships directed to specific ports which he serviced in the Pacific and falsifying service charges. In his plea, Francis identified seven Navy officials who accepted bribes. He faced a maximum prison sentence of 25 years and agreed to forfeit $35 million in personal assets, an amount he admitted to overcharging the Navy.

Due to medical problems, he was allowed to live under home detention beginning at least 2018 in San Diego. Due to be sentenced on September 22, 2022, he became a fugitive on September 5, after cutting off his ankle monitor.

== Scope of inquiry and prosecutions ==
Since 2013, 31 people have been criminally charged in connection with the Fat Leonard bribery and corruption scandal. According to investigators, by November 2017, more than 440 people — including 60 admirals — have come under scrutiny under the inquiry. The Navy held a military trial for a still-serving commander, David A. Morales, the first not left to civilian prosecution. He was charged with bribery, conspiracy to commit bribery, false official statements, failure to obey lawful orders, and conduct unbecoming an officer. He was acquitted of the first three charges in a bench trial, only found guilty of failure to obey lawful orders and conduct unbecoming.

As of September 2018, 30 people had pleaded guilty; 12 others had been charged (including eight Navy officers who were indicted in March 2017); four admirals were disciplined by the military; two others, four-star admiral Robert Willard and three-star Joe Donnelly, were known to be under investigation; and more than 150 other unidentified people have been scrutinized.

A March 2017 indictment made reference to "AG", a former officer in the Royal Australian Navy (RAN), who had been employed for several years as a liaison officer aboard USS Blue Ridge. On May 3, 2018, the Australian Broadcasting Corporation identified "AG" as Lieutenant Commander Alex Gillett, reporting that he had resigned from the Navy after being questioned by the Australian Federal Police. A second unidentified Australian of similar rank was also reported to be under investigation. A memo of understanding between the U.S. Navy and the RAN allows for the possible extradition of Australian personnel to the United States for the purposes of prosecution.

Among the nineteen people who have pleaded guilty to federal crimes, one was Francis himself, two others were his top deputies; and sixteen others were Navy personnel. The highest-ranking was Rear Admiral Robert Gilbeau, who was convicted in June 2016 after pleading guilty to making false statements to investigators about his contacts with Francis, becoming the first Navy admiral in modern American history to be convicted of a felony while on active duty. On May 17, 2017, U.S. District Judge Janis Lynn Sammartino sentenced Gilbeau to eighteen months in prison, although he was allowed to continue collecting his nearly $10,000 monthly pension. He was held in FCI Englewood, a low-security federal prison in Littleton, Colorado, and was released on November 1, 2018.

Corporate governance expert Mak Yuen Teen of the National University of Singapore noted that procurement in the defense industry is particularly vulnerable to bribery and corruption. "It is usually not that transparent," with infrequent bidding for large contracts. Blowing the whistle on superior officers might also be discouraged, he indicated. "Those at the top probably thought they could get away with it as their underlings were unlikely to squeal on them."

According to its spokesman Captain Amy Derrick, the U.S. Navy canceled all contracts with GDMA as the result of a 2013 audit.

In the case of former Naval Intelligence chief, Vice Admiral Ted N. Branch, both the Navy and the Department of Justice declined to prosecute after a three-year investigation.

On June 29, 2022, after a 16-week trial, a jury found former Captains David Newland, James Dolan, and David Lausman, and former Commander Mario Herrera guilty of conspiracy to commit bribery, accepting bribes, and wire fraud in connection with their acceptance of bribes from Francis' company in exchange for information regarding the Navy's Seventh Fleet. Lausman was further convicted of obstruction of justice involving the destruction of a computer's hard drive containing materials from his time as commanding officer of the USS George Washington, an aircraft carrier. The jury was unable to reach a unanimous verdict on charges against former Rear Admiral Bruce Loveless, and charges against him were dropped in September 2022.

On July 13, 2022, U.S. District Judge Janis Sammartino ruled that the lead federal prosecutor in the bribery and fraud trial of the five ex-Navy officers committed "flagrant misconduct" by withholding certain potentially exculpatory materials from defense lawyers, specifically, a statement from a prostitute allegedly involved with Lausman. The judge concluded that prosecutors had violated the Brady rule, but not to the degree that caused her to dismiss the prosecution's case.

=== Francis's escape while on bail ===
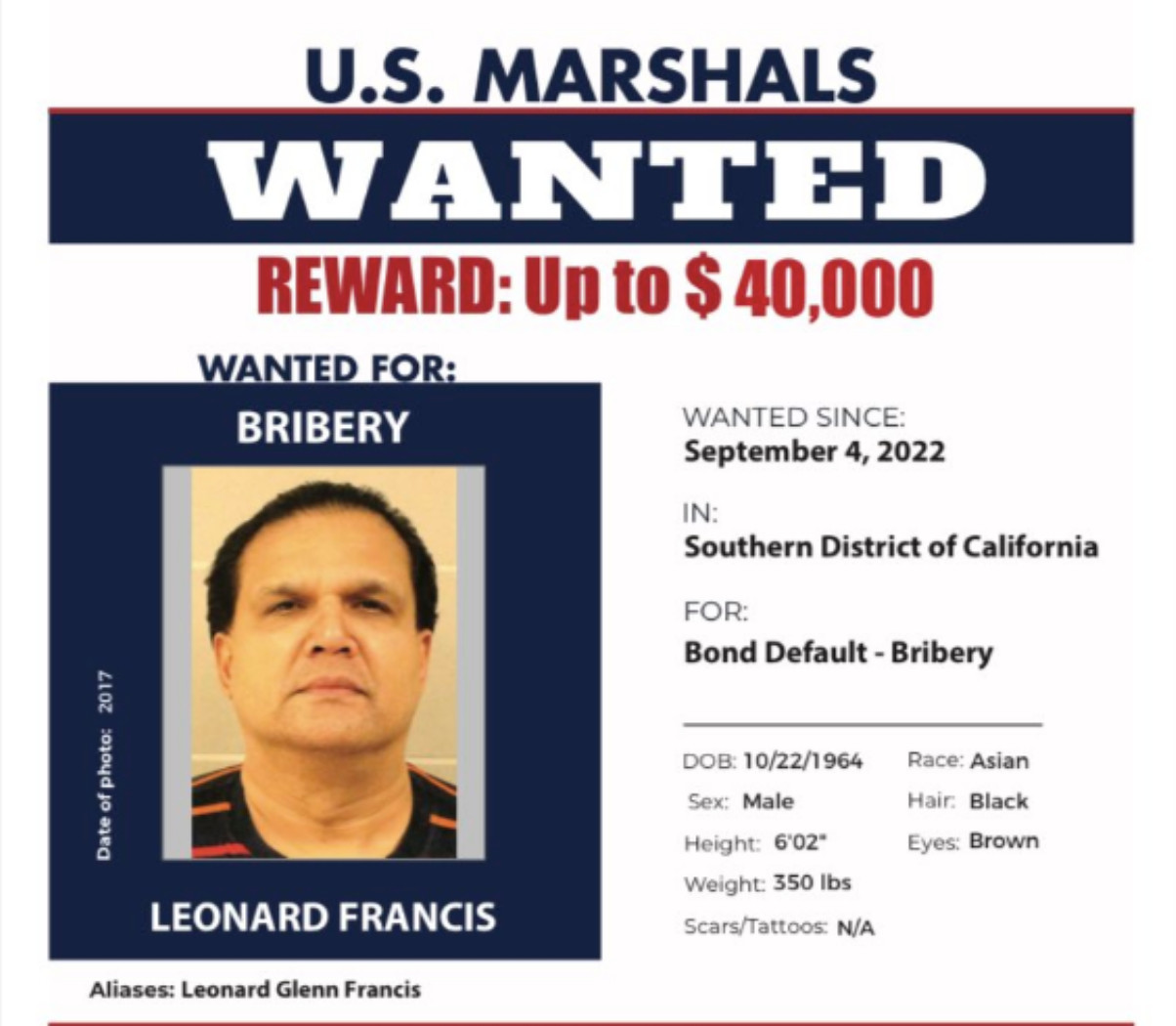
Leonard Francis 2017 mugshot - 2022 Wanted poster

On September 4, 2022, Francis removed his ankle bracelet and fled his rented San Diego home. Francis had been living in the home with his mother and three children. Judge Sammartino had ordered 24-hour surveillance at Francis' expense but had expressed concerns in the past when a security guard had been absent from their post for hours. After he fled, his guards said they had been confined while on duty to a garage at his home.

In a closed-door hearing in 2018, the judge expressed concern that if Francis were to escape and ended up "back in Malaysia for whatever reason," it would be asked, "who let somebody do this without any security?" Neighbors reported that cars displaying out-of-state licenses were parked outside the home four days before the escape, and a U-Haul truck was there two days before Francis disappeared.

It was believed he cut off his ankle monitor between 7:30 and 8:00 a.m. on September 4, and notice was only taken when a call was received by the San Diego police at 2:00 p.m. that day. When federal agents arrived, no security personnel were found to be present. Francis had been due in federal court on September 22, 2022, for sentencing.

In November 2020, a bariatric surgeon who had been treating Francis for obesity wrote an unsolicited letter to the judge to inform her that the improvement in his condition gave him a clean bill of health. Francis had been scheduled to testify in the upcoming trials of five Naval officers and four others were scheduled to be sentenced in October 2022.

=== Recapture ===
Francis was recaptured on September 22, 2022, seventeen days after his escape. He was arrested at Simón Bolívar International Airport outside Caracas, Venezuela, pursuant to an Interpol "red notice" as he was about to board a plane to Russia. He had flown from Mexico to Cuba, then on to Caracas. His children were not with him. The director-general of Interpol Venezuela disclosed the arrest, and said that Francis was handed to Venezuelan authorities for possible extradition proceedings.

Francis requested asylum in Venezuela. In mid-October 2022, Venezuela's highest court set a two-month deadline for the U.S. to file an extradition request to retrieve Francis. Per Department of Justice policy, it refused to comment on extradition requests until persons sought were returned to the U.S.

Sammartino had scheduled a status hearing date for December 14 in San Diego.

In December 2023, despite tense relations with the United States, Venezuela agreed to allow the extradition of Francis as part of a larger agreement that freed Alex Saab, an accused money launderer and associate of President Nicolas Maduro. Francis was turned over to U.S. custody to await a flight to the U.S., and arrived in Miami, Florida on December 21. Francis's attorneys requested permission to withdraw from their representation of him and he sought new counsel. After his scheduled sentencing on the original charges, the government was expected to try him on the escape charges as well. On February 8, 2024, Francis appeared once again in Sammartino's court and requested a 60-day extension to find new attorneys, which the U.S. Attorney opposed. He was given 45 days to find new counsel and return to court. On November 5, 2024, Francis was sentenced to 180 months in prison and ordered to pay $20 million in restitution. Francis was also ordered to forfeit $35 million.

== Corruption prevention ==
The scope of the GDMA investigation inadvertently hindered the Navy's ability to fill senior leadership roles, unintentionally delaying hundreds of officers’ careers and depleting the Navy's admiralty. Hundreds of those who had not been compromised needed investigation and clearance. That stalled promotions for years according to Ray Mabus, the then-Secretary of the Navy (SECNAV). "If Leonard Francis mentioned somebody's name, or it seemed to us that if somebody had served in a senior position in the Pacific during this time, which covered a lot of folks, they were caught up in this until their name could be pulled out...it took in a huge percentage of flag officers, and it really hamstrung the Navy in terms of promotions, in terms of positions," with his opinion widely shared.

The Department of Justice had forwarded to the USN almost 450 names that they declined to prosecute. The Navy elected to take only a handful to court-martial, issuing at least 12 letters of censure from Mabus and his successor, Richard V. Spencer, with some 40 other administrative actions. In early 2018, there were roughly 170 names still pending before the Consolidated Disposition Authority (CDA). "It's really been pretty devastating to the upper ranks of the Navy," said Mabus. "There were bad people here. You gotta catch them. You got to make sure they're punished. But there were a lot of people that didn't do anything that got caught up in this."

A retired Admiral said. "At least with Tailhook, people knew that if they went to Tailhook they were being looked at. Right now, as far as anyone knows, if you ever went west of Hawaii, you're being looked at." Another senior U.S. Pacific Command staffer informed a room of Australians, regarding the ongoing case, "China could never have dreamt up a way to do this much damage to the U.S. Navy's Pacific leadership."

GDMA's influence paralleled the Pacific Fleet's intentions to locate vessels into ports unfamiliar with its standards for services, that had been complicated by the al Qaida attack on the USS Cole in Yemen that killed 17 sailors. GDMA was able to provide services to meet more difficult standards than competitors could, 7th Fleet officers claimed. Francis had made himself indispensable.

In February 2018, Admiral Bill Moran, the Vice Chief of Naval Operations, announced the implementation of increased oversight and other measures and policies to deter a repeat of the widespread corruption in the "Fat Leonard" case. Glenn Fine, the principal deputy for the Department of Defense Office of the Inspector General, stated the Defense Criminal Investigative Service (DCIS), determined that GDMA, Francis’ contract firm, created a scheme to defraud the Navy of tens of millions of dollars via overbilling for supplying goods and services. The Navy created a Consolidated Disposition Authority (CDA) which was tasked with determining whether hundreds of Navy officers should be charged under the UCMJ, or alternatively, to be subjected to administrative actions. Fine said the CDA has already adjudicated 300-plus cases.

In May 2018, the Navy, which had been posting the names of personnel who had been fired in the case on its website, announced that it will discontinue the practice. California Representative Jackie Speier, the ranking member of the House Armed Services Subcommittee on Military Personnel, objected to the change in policy, characterizing it as a reduction in transparency and a barrier to the public's "right to know."

The private sector used feedback surveys to assess personnel performance, a method the Army adopted in 2001. The Army's initiative helped identify serious ethics problems amongst leaders. Besides “command climate” surveys, "360" evaluations identified causes for discipline or oversight among its upper ranks. The Navy has not extended such feedback to gather information from lower-ranking personnel, however.

Between Francis' arrest and the end of 2016, the Navy suspended 566 vendors, permanently debarring 548 more from contracts, according to the government's Interagency Suspension and Debarment Committee. Those included GDMA and 55 of its Pacific Rim affiliates. Public corruption watchdogs say that the internal revisions to the way the Navy deals with contractors are important, but the more difficult problem to remedy is a culture of corruption that poisoned the highest ranks of the U.S. Navy.

"Very few service members get promoted because they blew the whistle on their boss...If you don't get promoted, you get forced out of the service. If that happens before you are eligible for a retirement, you lose out on the lifetime pension. For most people, it is much safer to simply put your head down and keep going until 20 years," according to Dan Grazier, a Straus Military Reform Project fellow at Washington, D.C.'s Project on Government Oversight (POGO).

In 2019, Assistant U.S. Attorney Mark Pletcher of the Southern District of California and Special Agent Jim McWhirter of the Defense Criminal Investigative Service, both of whom were involved in the investigation and prosecution, became finalists for the Service to America medals.

== Similar corruption ==
Similar details of a ship husbandry corruption case similar to "Fat Leonard" but centered in Korea were aired in July 2019. The Ministry of Justice has charged Sung-Yol “David” Kim, head of DK Marine Service, with counts of conspiracy and bribery, according to pleadings filed with the Eastern District of Michigan. The case also alleged cover-ups and coordination to obscure the overcharges.

== Individuals involved ==
Except for the cases of Gursharan Kaur Sharon Rachael (who was tried in Singapore), Alex Gillett (who was tried in the Supreme Court of the Australian Capital Territory), and those of five persons charged in military courts (Captain John F. Steinberger, Commander David A. Morales, Commander Jason W. Starmer, Lt. Peter Vapor, and Chief Warrant Officer Brian T. Ware), all court proceedings as of March 15, 2021, have been in U.S. federal court.

As of September 15, 2022, 29 defendants have pleaded guilty. Captains David Newland, James Dolan, David Lausman, and Commander Mario Herrera were found guilty at trial. Donald Hornbeck and Lieutenant Commander Stephen Shedd had entered not guilty pleas that remained outstanding; Shedd later entered a guilty plea. Their trials had been scheduled to begin on November 1, 2021, but were put off until February 2022.

=== Selective overturning of verdicts ===
Although there had been convictions in June 2022, regarding the bribery cases of former Captains David Newland, James Dolan and David Lausman, and ex-Commander Mario Herrera, Judge Sammartino reversed their verdicts on September 6, 2023, and allowed them to plead to misdemeanors and pay fines of $100 apiece.

Name	Role/position	Details	Outcome	Citation
Leonard Glenn "Fat Leonard" Francis	Singapore-based defense contractor; president/CEO of Glenn Defense Marine Asia (GDMA)	Francis admitted "he bribed 'scores' of U.S. Navy officials with $500,000 in cash, six figures' worth of sex from his 'Thai SEAL team' of traveling prostitutes that greeted ships, lavish hotel stays, spa treatments, $2,000 boxes of Cuban cigars, Kobe beef, Spanish suckling pigs, foie gras terrine, cognac, and an array of other luxury goods." In return, Navy officers provided Francis with classified information, such as ship movements, enabling him to routinely overcharge the Navy for services GDMA provided for warships in port, such as sewage removal, ground transport, and communications.	Pleaded guilty in January 2015 to bribery, conspiracy to commit bribery, and conspiracy to defraud the United States. Agreed to testify for the prosecution. Awaited sentencing but fled from home confinement on September 4, 2022, and was recaptured by Interpol in Venezuela. Following yearlong negotiations with the Venezuelan government, including an exchange of prisoners, was formally extradited to the United States (Miami) on December 21, 2023, then transferred to federal authorities (San Diego) in early January 2024 to face multiple charges. Sentenced to 15 years in jail in November 2024.	
Edmond Aruffo	Top deputy to Francis; Japan country manager for GDMA; retired U.S. Navy officer	Was given "unfettered access" to the headquarters ship of the 7th Fleet, often dining at the officers' mess.	Pleaded guilty in July 2014 to conspiracy to defraud the U.S. Released on bail in September 2014. He was sentenced to 850 hours of support services for military veterans on October 26, 2022, plus three years probation. The matter of the amount of a fine was not resolved at the time of sentencing, but his considerable assistance to the prosecution mitigated that outcome.	
Alex Wisidagama	Top deputy to Francis, and his cousin; global manager for government contracts at GDMA	Singapore citizen who fabricated invoices, concocted bids by nonexistent competitors to satisfy acquisition requirements, and massively overbilled for vessel husbandry services.	Pleaded guilty in March 2014 to conspiracy to defraud the United States, and was sentenced in March 2016 to 63 months in prison and ordered to pay the Navy $34.8 million in restitution. Released on November 9, 2017.	
Sharon Gursharan Kaur	Former Francis and later Simpkins subordinate, employed by U.S. Navy in contracting	Charged with leaking "confidential contract information to Francis in exchange for $165,000 in cash and luxury travel."	Charged in Singapore courts with bribery in 2016. Pleaded guilty in June 2017 in Singapore to corruption. On July 7, 2018, was sentenced to 33 months in prison.	
Pornpun "Yin" Settaphakorn	Thai citizen and supervisor of GDMA's Thailand office, indicted in 2014 with GDMA Singapore executives Neil Peterson and Linda Raja, both of whom pleaded guilty, released after serving years in prison.	Settaphakorn allegedly overbilled by more than five million dollars by fabricating invoices, concocting bids tendered by nonexistent competitors to satisfy the U.S. Navy's acquisition requirements for vessel husbandry services, allegedly committing conspiracy to commit wire fraud, defrauded the United States, and made multiple false claims. She was extradited to San Diego for prosecution after being held in Thailand for two years.	On March 5, 2021, Settaphakorn pleaded not guilty to all charges in federal court.	
Lieutenant Commander Alex Gillett	Australian Defence Force liaison to the 7th Fleet	Francis allegedly provided luxury accommodations, prostitutes and five-figure group gourmet meals at various ports. These included stays at the Shangri-La hotel in Kota Kinabalu, Malaysia, in May 2008, in November 2008 at the Shangri-La in Kowloon, and the JW Marriott Hotel in Hong Kong, all joined by Gillett and others. Gillett denied acceptance of services of prostitutes.	Identified in U.S. indictments, but not arrested. Sentenced to 150 hours of community service, and avoided imprisonment in return for assisting with the prosecution of others.	
Rear Admiral Robert Gilbeau	Former special assistant to the chief of the Navy Supply Corps	A 1983 graduate of the U.S. Naval Academy and recipient of the Bronze Star and Purple Heart, Gilbeau admitted in a plea agreement to "concealing the duration and extent of his relationship" with Francis when being questioned by federal investigators.[76] Gilbeau also destroyed papers and computer files after Francis's arrest and falsely told investigators that he had never received gifts from Francis.[76] Catering for 20 years to Gilbeau's particular preferences, Francis provided him with Vietnamese prostitutes, "two at a time."[21]	Pleaded guilty in June 2016 to making a false official statement. Retired from active duty in September 2016 and was demoted to captain. Sentenced to 18 months in prison, in addition to a $100,000 fine, $50,000 in restitution, 300 hours of community service, and three years probation. Was held at Federal Correctional Institution, Englewood and released on November 1, 2018.	
Captain Michael George Brooks (retired)	Former U.S. naval attaché in the Philippines.	Brooks, of Fairfax Station, Virginia, was the U.S. naval attaché in Manila from 2006 to 2008. He admitted that he had been provided with the services of prostitutes on dozens of occasions, and, "...acknowledged that he and his family members accepted fine wines, hotel rooms, electronics, luxury watches and from Francis." He confirmed that he had secretly passed confidential Navy documents to Francis and Glenn Defense; permitted Glenn Defense to write its own 2007 Navy performance evaluation; and "illicitly secured diplomatic clearance for Glenn Defense so that the firm could bring cargo and personnel into the Philippines without being subject to inspections and customs duties."	Pleaded guilty in November 2016 to conspiracy to commit bribery. On June 16, 2017, he was sentenced to three and one-half years in prison and was also ordered to pay the Navy a $41,000 fine plus $31,000 in restitution. Was released on May 28, 2019.	
Captain Daniel Dusek	Former deputy director of operations for the United States Seventh Fleet former commander of the USS Bonhomme Richard	Joined the conspiracy in 2010. Served 26 years in the Navy. Was bribed with thousands of dollars in cash and luxury goods in exchange for providing classified information to Francis and arranging "for the carrier Abraham Lincoln and the amphibious assault ship Peleliu to stop at ports where Francis' firm was dominant and could get the bid to provide services to the ships." Erased emails to conceal crimes.	Pleaded guilty in January 2015 to conspiracy to commit bribery; sentenced in March 2016 to 46 months in prison and ordered to pay $100,000 in fines and restitution. Was held at a Residential Reentry Management Center in Seattle and released on October 17, 2018.	
Commander David Kapaun	Former deputy chief of staff for special operations at the Pacific Command	Lied on his security clearance renewal application by not disclosing he had a long-standing "unfavorable" relationship with Francis.	Pleaded guilty on June 6, 2017, to making false statements. Sentenced September 11, 2017, to 18 months in federal prison plus to make $50,000 in restitution and pay $25,000 in fines, with 200 hours of community service. Released from federal prison on February 8, 2019.	
Commander (Vannak Khiem) Michael Misiewicz	Former deputy director of operations for the Seventh Fleet former commander of the USS Mustin	Francis supplied him with prostitutes, cash, luxury hotel stays, international airfare for himself and his family, and tickets to a Thailand concert by Lady Gaga and a Lion King performance in Japan. He supplied Francis with information about vessel movements including about submarines as well as ballistic-missile defense plans in Asia.	Pleaded guilty in January 2016 to conspiracy and bribery; sentenced in April 2016 to 78 months in prison and ordered to pay $195,000 in fines and restitution. Was held at United States Penitentiary, Lompoc, California, and was released on January 14, 2022.	
Commander Jose Luis Sanchez	Former logistics officer for the United States Seventh Fleet	Joined the scheme in 2008. Served as the executive officer for Fleet Logistics Center Yokosuka until April 2013. Admitted to taking bribes over more than four years, in the form of more than $100,000 in cash, payment of travel expenses, and the services of prostitutes, in exchange for providing confidential Navy information to Glenn Defense.	Pleaded guilty in January 2015 to bribery and conspiracy to commit bribery. Sentencing was scheduled for May 23, 2023. Felony conviction was dismissed May 21, 2024, at the request of the government due to prosecutorial errors. Sanchez pled guilty to a misdemeanor charge of disclosing information.	
Lieutenant Commander Gentry "Weasel Boy" Debord	Former logistics officer and stock control officer aboard the USS Essex from 2007 to 2010	Admitted to taking bribes from GDMA for several years in the form of travel, entertainment and the services of prostitutes, with evidence including his reporting having indulged in group sex. In return, Debord assisted Glenn Defense in submitting fake invoices to the Navy and tipped Francis off about a Navy investigation into his company. Debord attributed his entanglement in the scheme to his sex addiction.	Pleaded guilty in October 2016 to conspiracy to commit bribery; sentenced in January 2017 to 30 months in prison and ordered to pay $52,000 in fines and restitution. Remanded to Federal Correctional Institution, Morgantown, West Virginia until he was released on February 5, 2019. Awaiting a board of review from Navy to determine if he is eligible for retirement as a lieutenant commander or to be demoted to lieutenant or lieutenant junior grade.	
Lieutenant Commander Todd Malaki	Former logistics planner and supply officer	Over seven years, Malaki provided Francis with proprietary and confidential military documents to assist GMDA in exchange for hotel rooms, cash and a prostitute. In 2006, Malaki provided him with invoices and bid information supplied by competing contractors.	Pleaded guilty in April 2015 to conspiracy to commit bribery; sentenced in January 2016 to 40 months in prison and ordered to pay $30,000 in fines and restitution. Was held at United States Penitentiary, Tucson, Arizona, and released on March 28, 2018.	
Commander Troy Amundson (retired)	Former officer on the USS Halsey	From September 2012 through October 2013, Francis paid for dinner, drinks, transportation, and procured prostitutes for Amundson. In exchange, Amundson gave proprietary information to Francis.	Pleaded guilty in January 2018 to one count of conspiracy to commit bribery. Sentenced to 2 1/2 years in prison, $10,000 fine along with restitution of $21,625.60. Was held at FCI Sandstone in Minnesota. Released on February 25, 2021.	
Petty Officer 1st Class Dan Layug	Former logistics specialist for the USS Blue Ridge and United States Seventh Fleet	"Leaked competitors' business secrets and classified ship schedules on six occasions."	Pleaded guilty in May 2014 to conspiracy to commit bribery; sentenced in January 2016 to 27 months in prison and fined $15,000. Was held at United States Penitentiary, Atwater, California, released on April 25, 2018.	
John Beliveau II	Former special agent, Naval Criminal Investigative Service	Beliveau was a supervisor whose case the prosecutor compared to Massachusetts gangster Whitey Bulger's Winter Hill Gang which had corrupted the Boston FBI.	Pleaded guilty in December 2013 to bribery and conspiracy to commit bribery; sentenced in October 2016 to 12 years in prison. Being held at Federal Correctional Institution, Allenwood Low in Pennsylvania.	
Paul Simpkins	Former Navy contracting supervisor based in Singapore	Simpkins took $350,000 in bribes from Francis, in the form of cash and funds wired to a bank account in Japan controlled by his wife. In return, Simpkins protected Glenn Defense's contracts; he "ordered other Navy officials to stop reviewing fraudulent invoices from the firm, and blocked the installation of special equipment that would have detected a scheme by Francis to overcharge the Navy for pumping wastewater from its ships" and on one occasion "overruled a recommendation from a junior officer to cancel one of Glenn Defense's contracts for poor performance."	Pleaded guilty in June 2016 to bribery, and conspiracy to commit bribery; sentenced in December 2016 to six years in prison and ordered to pay $450,000 in fines and restitution. Was held at Federal Correctional Institution, Morgantown, West Virginia, and released on April 25, 2019.	
Rear Admiral Bruce Franklin Loveless (retired)	Former U.S. Navy Director of Intelligence Operations, United States Seventh Fleet intelligence chief	Allegedly recruited into the scheme in 2006. Had been tasked with assessing and counteracting foreign intelligence threats located within the Seventh Fleet's geographic area of responsibility. Alleged to have received emoluments from Francis including provisions of prostitutes and stays at the Bangkok Conrad hotel and at the Shangri-La Hotel Jakarta and the Shangri-La Hotel Singapore, all in May 2008, and at the Makati Shangri-La, Manila, in the presidential suite, where he and Hornbeck, Dolan, Lausman and Shedd emptied the hotel of its entire stock of Dom Perignon champagne during a "raging multi-day party, with a rotating carousel of prostitutes," according to the indictment.	Charged in March 2017 with Conspiracy to Commit Honest Services Wire Fraud and Bribery and making false statements. Released pending prosecution on March 14, 2017. Trial was rescheduled for 2022. On June 29, 2022, jury deadlocked. Charges were dropped on September 15, 2022.	
Captain David A. "Too Tall" Lausman (retired)	Former commanding officer of the USS George Washington and USS Blue Ridge	Allegedly recruited into the scheme in 2006. Lausman and his wife were alleged to have taken a luxury trip to Thailand paid for by Francis and Lausman's wife allegedly accepted his gift of an $11,345 Versace handbag. Francis was said to have paid for him at the Makati Shangri-La, Manila's presidential suite.	Charged in March 2017 with Conspiracy to Commit Honest Services Wire Fraud and Bribery, obstruction of justice, and making false statements. Found guilty of all charges in June 2022. Reversed by Judge Sammartino in September 2023, who accepted misdemeanor plea and fined him $100.	
Commander Stephen F. Shedd	Former commanding officer of the USS Milius, a destroyer, and planning officer for the United States Seventh Fleet	Allegedly recruited into the scheme in 2006. Francis was claimed to have paid for his stay at the Makati Shangri-La, Manila, in the presidential suite, where he and Hornbeck, Dolan, Lausman and Loveless drained the hotel of its entire stock of Dom Perignon champagne during a "raging multi-day party, with a rotating carousel of prostitutes," according to the indictment. Room and alcohol charges exceeded $50,000. In an email, Shedd told Francis, "It's been a while since I've done 36 hours of straight drinking." In the case of former Australian Defence Force (ADF) Lieutenant Commander, Alex Gillett, Shedd, who was allegedly helping to coordinate the GDMA's schemes, was said to have recruited him into what was termed the "wolf pack" in early January 2008. Shedd and his wife were said to have received watches worth $25,000 from Francis. The corrupt relationship lasted at least through 2012.	Charged in March 2017 with Conspiracy to Commit Honest Services Wire Fraud and Bribery. Released from Bureau of Prisons on March 15, 2017, pending prosecution of charges Pled guilty on January 27, 2022. Felony conviction was dismissed May 21, 2024, at the request of the government due to prosecutorial errors.	
Commander Donald "Bubbles" Hornbeck (retired)	Former Deputy Chief of Staff for Operations, United States Seventh Fleet	Allegedly recruited into the scheme in 2006. Francis allegedly paid for his stay in the presidential suite, at the Makati Shangri-La, Manila, where he and Shedd, Dolan, Lausman and Loveless drained the hotel of all of its Dom Perignon champagne during a "raging multi-day party, with a rotating carousel of prostitutes," according to the indictment.	Charged in March 2017 with Conspiracy to Commit Honest Services Wire Fraud and Bribery. Awaiting trial; has pleaded not guilty. Felony conviction was dismissed May 21, 2024, at the request of the government due to prosecutorial errors. Hornbeck pled guilty to a misdemeanor charge of disclosing information.	
Captain David Newland (retired)	Former Chief of Staff to the Commander, United States Seventh Fleet	Allegedly recruited into the scheme in 2006. Allegedly in February 2007, he and other officers used MacArthur memorabilia in the commission of sex acts with prostitutes in the MacArthur suite at the Manila Hotel.	Charged in March 2017 with Conspiracy to Commit Honest Services Wire Fraud and Bribery. On 6 September 2023, felony charges dismissed. Plead guilty to a misdemeanor of sending an email. Reversed by Judge Sammartino, who accepted misdemeanor plea, fining him $100.	
Colonel Enrico "Rick" DeGuzman (retired)	Former assistant chief of staff of operations, United States Marine Corps Forces, Pacific and after USN retirement, civilian deputy chief of staff of operations.	Allegedly recruited into the scheme in 2006. Two weeks after the Judge Advocate General of the 7th Fleet authored a memo on February 2, 2007, warning personnel not to accept gifts from contractors, DeGuzman, with his wife, who were accompanied by other officers, were alleged to have eaten at the Jaan Restaurant and accepted lodging in Singapore that cost $30,000. Other meals included ones at Hong Kong's Pétrus Restaurant, which came to $20,435, and Tokyo's New York Grill in Tokyo costing $30,000.	Charged in March 2017 with Conspiracy to Commit Honest Services Wire Fraud and Bribery. Awaiting sentencing; has pleaded guilty. The charges to which he pleaded included a total of more than $60,000, the meal at the Pétrus Restaurant, and obtaining false receipts from Francis meant to cover up the illegal emoluments he had received in furtherance of the scheme. Felony conviction was dismissed May 21, 2024, at the request of the government due to prosecutorial errors. DeGuzman pled guilty to a misdemeanor charge of disclosing information.	
Captain James Dolan (retired)	Former assistant chief of staff for logistics, United States Seventh Fleet	Allegedly recruited into the scheme in 2006. Allegedly intervened on GDMA's behalf in contracting and billing disputes, accepting travel and the services of prostitutes, and to have been a participant in carousing at the Makati Shangri-La, Manila, in the presidential suite, paid for by Francis, where he and Hornbeck, Dolan, Shedd, and Loveless consumed the hotel's entire stock of Dom Perignon champagne during a "raging multi-day party, with a rotating carousel of prostitutes," according to the indictment.	Charged in March 2017 with Conspiracy to Commit Honest Services Wire Fraud and Bribery. On June 29, 2022, found guilty at trial, awaiting sentencing. Reversed by Judge Sammartino in September 2023, who accepted misdemeanor plea and fined him $100.	
Chief Warrant Officer Robert Gorsuch (retired)	Former flag administration officer, United States Seventh Fleet	Allegedly recruited into the scheme in 2006. Allegedly screened candidates for potential participation in conspiracy.	Charged in March 2017 with Conspiracy to Commit Honest Services Wire Fraud and Bribery. Pled guilty in August 2021; required to only pay forfeiture. Felony conviction was dismissed May 21, 2024, at the request of the government due to prosecutorial errors. Gorsuch pled guilty to a misdemeanor charge of disclosing information.	
Commander Mario Herrera	Former fleet operations/schedules officer, United States Seventh Fleet	Allegedly recruited into the scheme in 2007. Allegedly granted diplomatic clearance to GDMA to enable it to bring armed guards into the Philippines, avoid inspections and payment of customs duties.	Charged in February 2017 with Conspiracy to Commit Honest Services Wire Fraud and Bribery. On June 29, 2022, found guilty at trial, awaiting sentencing. Reversed by Judge Sammartino in September 2023, who accepted misdemeanor plea and fined him $100.	
Commander Bobby R. Pitts (retired)	Former supply and logistics officer, United States Seventh Fleet Singapore	As Officer in Charge (OIC) of the Fleet Industrial Supply Command (FISC) of 7th Fleet's in the western Pacific, leaked "for Official Use Only" Naval Criminal Investigative Service (NCIS) files and forwarded an email detailing FISC oversight to GDMA, to enable GDMA's obstruction of fraud investigations regarding its operations.	Indicted by a federal grand jury in May 2016; charged with conspiracy to defraud the United States, receiving services of a prostitute, and obstructions of official proceedings. Pleaded guilty on August 15, 2017, to conspiracy to defraud the United States, Sentenced to 18 months in prison and a $22,500 fine.	
Commander David Alexander Morales	Former Singapore action officer for command post exercises	He went to trial by general court-martial during the week of August 27, 2018, with charges of bribery, conspiracy to commit bribery, making a false official statement, violation of lawful orders, and conduct unbecoming an officer. He was acquitted of the first three charges, found guilty of violating lawful orders and conduct unbecoming an officer.	Military article 32 hearing began in Norfolk, Virginia, on June 26, 2017, with the accused referred for court-martial: His arraignment was on September 13, 2017. A preliminary hearing officer recommended that certain previous charges be dismissed for lack of probable cause. Leonard Francis testified via video from San Diego, but the presiding judge found that his testimony lacked some credibility. Sentencing on September 1, 2018, was 165 days in custody, loss of $30,000 in pay, and a $5,000 fine. In the course of appeals, the charge of violation of lawful orders was dismissed on August 10, 2021, leaving only the conduct unbecoming charge, a single misdemeanor equivalent offense, in place after nearly 8 years of investigations and legal proceedings.	
Commander Jason W. Starmer	Former Joint United States Military Advisory Group, Thailand	Allegedly took bribes in the form of meals, liquor, and the services of a prostitute. He was charged with conduct unbecoming an officer, disobeying orders, and adultery.	His military article 32 hearing began in Norfolk, Virginia, on August 30, 2017. He pleaded guilty to willful dereliction of duty and conduct unbecoming and was sentenced to receive a letter of reprimand and a $10,000 fine. His characterizations of service and retirement grade were to be determined later by the Navy secretary.	
Captain Jesus V. Cantu (retired)	Assistant chief of staff for logistics, 7th Fleet; deputy commander, Far East Division, Military Sealift Command, Singapore	Admitted taking bribes and the services of prostitutes from Francis until 2013.	Pleaded guilty to conspiracy to commit bribery. On February 23, 2023, sentenced to 30 months in prison, restitution of $100,000 and a $75,000 fine.	
Captain John F. Steinberger	Formerly commanded a destroyer squadron attached to the aircraft carrier USS Carl Vinson	His charges included conspiracy, violation of a lawful order, conduct unbecoming an officer, graft and bribery, including accepting discounted and free hotel rooms, food, beverages, and services of prostitutes at or near Hong Kong, Kuala Lumpur, Malaysia, Manila, Philippines and Perth, Australia, in exchange for providing information regarding competitors and his attempts to influence senior officials concerning the husbanding of Navy vessels and port visit location selections.	Arraignment was in Norfolk, Virginia, on December 5, 2017. Steinberger had faced a maximum sentence of 14 1/2 years confinement, dismissal from the Navy, forfeiture of all pay and allowances plus a fine. He pleaded guilty to willful dereliction of duty and conduct unbecoming, but received only a punitive letter of reprimand, a $10,000 fine and administrative separation. His retirement grade was O-5, as determined by the Secretary of the Navy.	
Chief Warrant Officer Brian T. Ware	Former Food Service Officer for the aircraft carrier, the USS George Washington and the Seventh Fleet Command Ship, the USS Blue Ridge	Charged with taking $8,000 in bribes in the form of hotel rooms, driver service, and cellphones during more than twelve port visits and allowing substantial overcharges for provisions.	Pleaded guilty in military court to disobeying lawful orders and accepting graft. Fined $10,000 and sentenced to six months confinement.	
Lieutenant Peter L. Vapor	Supply Corps officer, formerly based in Singapore, now in San Diego.	Charged in August 2017 with lying to investigators, accepting food, liquor, the services of prostitutes, adultery and conduct unbecoming an officer.	On February 27, 2018, Vapor pleaded guilty during an Admiral's mast to violating a lawful order, conduct unbecoming, and making a false official statement. He received a letter of reprimand, a $2,000 fine, and forfeited a month's pay in exchange for the dismissal of charges against him.	
Neil Peterson	Vice president of global operations, Glenn Defense	Arranged for prostitutes for corrupt officers	Indicted by a federal grand jury in December 2014; charged with fraud and conspiracy; arrested in Singapore in September 2016 and extradited to San Diego in October 2016; pleaded guilty. Sentenced on August 11, 2017, to 70 months in prison. Held at Safford FCI in Arizona, scheduled for release November 26, 2021.	
Linda Raja	General manager for Singapore, Australia and Pacific Isles, Glenn Defense	Fabricated fake billings, bids, and invoices.	Indicted by a federal grand jury in December 2014; charged with fraud and conspiracy; arrested in Singapore in September 2016 and extradited to San Diego in October 2016. Pleaded guilty. Raja was sentenced on August 11, 2017, to 46 months in prison.	
Unknown individual	Unnamed Glenn Defense employee		Indicted by a federal grand jury in December 2014; charged with fraud and conspiracy charges. The employee is thought to be an Asian; an arrest warrant has been issued but the defendant's name has not been made public.	
Captain Ricardo Martinez (retired)	U.S. Naval attaché to Indonesia and New Zealand from 2001 to 2008	Martinez received or solicited nearly $16,000 in gifts from Francis and GDMA beginning the improper relationship in 2002, sharing confidential information regarding the 7th Fleet commander's visit in April 2003.	Was censured by Secretary of the Navy (SECNAV) Richard V. Spencer on April 26, 2019.	
Captain Heedong Choi	Commanding officer of the guided-missile destroyer Chafee	(SECNAV) Spencer noted Choi's relationship with Francis began in 2001, when Choi was a flag aide to the 7th Fleet commander, continued from 2008 to 2013, through several Western Pacific leadership positions, including as Chafee C.O. Choi attempted to impede a 2012 investigation into Francis. Choi notified Mr. Francis of an NCIS probe, providing Francis information to help avoid or minimize criminal and civil liability. In 2009 Francis provided lavish marriage arrangements costing about $18,000. Between 2008 and 2013, Choi took more than $25,000 in gifts from Francis, improperly endorsed GDMA and facilitated "inappropriate relationships" between Francis and other Navy officers.	Was censured on April 26, 2019, by (SECNAV). He remains on active duty and is currently stationed with the Navy Reserve Officers' Training Corps (ROTC) at State University of New York Maritime College.	
Captain Timothy Conroy (retired)	Former chief of staff for Carrier Strike Group Seven.	Was censured by Secretary of the Navy (SECNAV) Richard V. Spencer as he had engaged in "conduct unbecoming an officer," which was "an embarrassment" to the service. "It is incumbent that naval officers, particularly those placed in positions of great trust and responsibility, be held to the highest standards of both personal and professional behavior." Conroy, "disregarded those standards and engaged in conduct that reflected unethical and improper personal behavior and set poor standards of leadership." Conroy had accepted the services of a prostitute, misled investigators, and provided a poor role model for his subordinates.	Disciplined by the Navy—received censure in June 2018 but retired in 2010. Despite his censure, he retained his security clearance after his retirement and was hired back by the Navy for a six-figure salary as a civilian employee.	
Captain Charles Johnson	Served in various positions in the western Pacific.	Was censured by Spencer for engaging in "conduct unbecoming an officer," which was "an embarrassment" to the service. "It is incumbent that naval officers, particularly those placed in positions of great trust and responsibility, be held to the highest standards of both personal and professional behavior." Johnson, Spencer continued, "disregarded those standards and engaged in conduct that reflected unethical and improper personal behavior and set poor standards of leadership."	Disciplined by the Navy—received censure in June 2018. Remains on active duty.	
Rear Admiral Adrian Jansen	Former naval attaché to Indonesia and defense attaché to China	An Admiral's mast following a Navy investigation determined that Jansen violated Article 92 of the Uniform Code of Military Justice (UCMJ) by having "...an inappropriately familiar relationship" with Francis while serving as the naval attaché to Indonesia. He had accepted unreported gifts of dinners and wine exceeding $5,000, in violation of the law and Navy regulations.	Disciplined by the Navy—received non-judicial punishment by the Navy and forfeited $7,500 in pay in February 2017; retirement pending.	
Rear Admiral Bette Bolivar (retired)	Former Navy Region Southwest Commander	As lieutenant Commander allegedly accepted gifts of hotel, meals, golf outing in 1998 in Kota Kinabalu, Malaysia, per a memo signed by Admiral Philip S. Davidson in July 2017.	Was not indicted.	
Rear Admiral Mark Montgomery (retired)	Former Director of Pacific Operations	After retiring from the Navy in October 2017, became the policy director for the United States Senate Armed Services Committee, recruited for the position by Senator John McCain. He departed that staff job after McCain died and Senator James Inhofe became chairman. President Donald Trump nominated him in June 2018 to become an assistant administrator with the United States Agency for International Development (USAID) but withdrew the nomination in November 2018. He had allegedly taken bribes from Francis and lied to investigators.	Was not indicted, but instead was censured by the Navy in November 2018.	
Vice Admiral Michael H. Miller (retired)	Former superintendent of the United States Naval Academy	Along with Kraft and Pimpo, was censured by Secretary of the Navy Ray Mabus "to 'document their failure of leadership' related to dealings with Glenn Defense Marine Asia between 2006 and 2007."	Disciplined by the Navy—received censure in February 2015 and retired in August 2015.	
Rear Admiral Richard Wren (retired)	Former commander of Carrier Strike Group Five and of U.S. Naval Forces Japan	Was censured by Secretary of the Navy Richard V. Spencer because he "repeatedly and improperly" took gifts from Francis between 2007 and 2010 and Spencer wrote Wren later misled investigators about his relationship with Francis. He engaged in "conduct unbecoming an officer," which was "an embarrassment" to the service. "It is incumbent that naval officers, particularly those placed in positions of great trust and responsibility, be held to the highest standards of both personal and professional behavior." Spencer continued, Wren, "disregarded those standards and engaged in conduct that reflected unethical and improper personal behavior and set poor standards of leadership."	Disciplined by the Navy—retired since 2011 and received nonpunitive letter of censure in 2018	
Rear Admiral Terry Kraft (retired)	Former commander, U.S. Naval Forces, Japan	Along with Miller and Pimpo, was censured by Secretary of the Navy "to 'document their failure of leadership' related to dealings with Glenn Defense Marine Asia between 2006 and 2007."	Disciplined by the Navy—received censure in February 2015 and was forced into retirement in July 2015.	
Rear Admiral David R. Pimpo (retired)	Former commander, Naval Supply Systems Command	Along with Kraft and Miller, was censured by Secretary of the Navy "to 'document their failure of leadership' related to dealings with Glenn Defense Marine Asia between 2006 and 2007."	Disciplined by the Navy—received censure in February 2015, was demoted to captain, and was forced into retirement in July 2015.	
Rear Adm. Kenneth "K.J." Norton (retired)	Former commander, USS Ronald Reagan	As with Pimpo, Kraft and Miller in 2015, Norton was censured by the incoming Secretary of the Navy, Richard V. Spencer, because he intentionally violated the military Standards of Ethical Conduct, U.S. Navy Regulations, the Joint Ethics Regulation and the Uniform Code of Military Justice "and brought ill-repute and disgrace upon the U.S. Navy."	Disciplined by the Navy—received censure November 6, 2017. Had retired in 2014.	
Adm. Samuel J. Locklear (retired)	Former commander, U.S. Pacific Command	Francis told Navy investigators that he paid for "opulent dinners and other favors" for Locklear, including procuring a prostitute.	The Navy cleared Locklear of wrongdoing, but the episode prevented his appointment as Chairman of the Joint Chiefs of Staff, for which he had been shortlisted.	
Captain David Haas (Retired)	Former Director of Seventh Fleet Maritime Operations aboard the USS Blue Ridge	Allegedly took $145,000 in bribes from Francis and participation in parties involving prostitutes including a two-day, $75,000 affair, and involvement in recruiting additional Navy co-conspirators.	Relieved of command in November 2013 due to GDMA-related conduct. Retired in December 2016. Charged in August 2018. Pled guilty in June 2020 to conspiracy to commit bribery. He agreed to pay restitution of $90,968.82. On February 2, 2023, he was sentenced to 2 1/2 years in prison along with a $30,000 fine.	
Master Chief Petty Officer Ricarte Icmat David (Retired)	Various 7th Fleet logistics posts	Allegedly conspired with Francis, GDMA, and others. In exchange for breaching his fiduciary duties to the Navy and the American public, David received cash, hotel rooms, and prostitutes. Conspired to receive bribes from Francis and others after approval of fraudulently inflated invoices following port visits, passing classified information to GDMA, advocating for it in contracting disputes, and providing GDMA with internal Navy information regarding competitors for contracts.	Charged in August 2018 with honest services fraud. Entered a guilty plea in San Diego federal court to a single count of conspiracy to commit honest services fraud. He was sentenced to 17 months in prison, followed by one year of supervised release and $30,000 in restitution on November 13, 2018. He is being held at the Federal Correctional Institution, Seagoville in Texas and was released on February 7, 2020.	
Chief Petty Officer Brooks Alonzo Parks (Retired)	Seventh fleet logistics	Allegedly received gifts, luxurious hotel suites, airline tickets, and additional benefits in return for Parks providing sensitive and proprietary U.S. Navy information, including competitor pricing and Navy ship and personnel movement information.	Charged in August 2018 with honest services fraud. Pled guilty in June 2020 to conspiracy to commit bribery. Sentenced to 27 months and restitution of $25,405.76.	
Captain Jeffrey Breslau (retired)	From 2009 until 2012, Pacific Fleet public affairs director	Received $65,000 from Francis for ghostwriting materials he authored and sending at least 135 emails on his behalf, reviewing 33 documents, writing talking points 14 times, and providing confidential information to GDMA.	Pleaded guilty and in February 2019, was sentenced to six months in prison. Additionally fined $20,000, ordered to pay $65,000 in restitution to the Navy. Held at FCI Manchester. Release date was October 3, 2019.	
