= Thomas A. Brooks =

U.S Navy Rear-Admiral

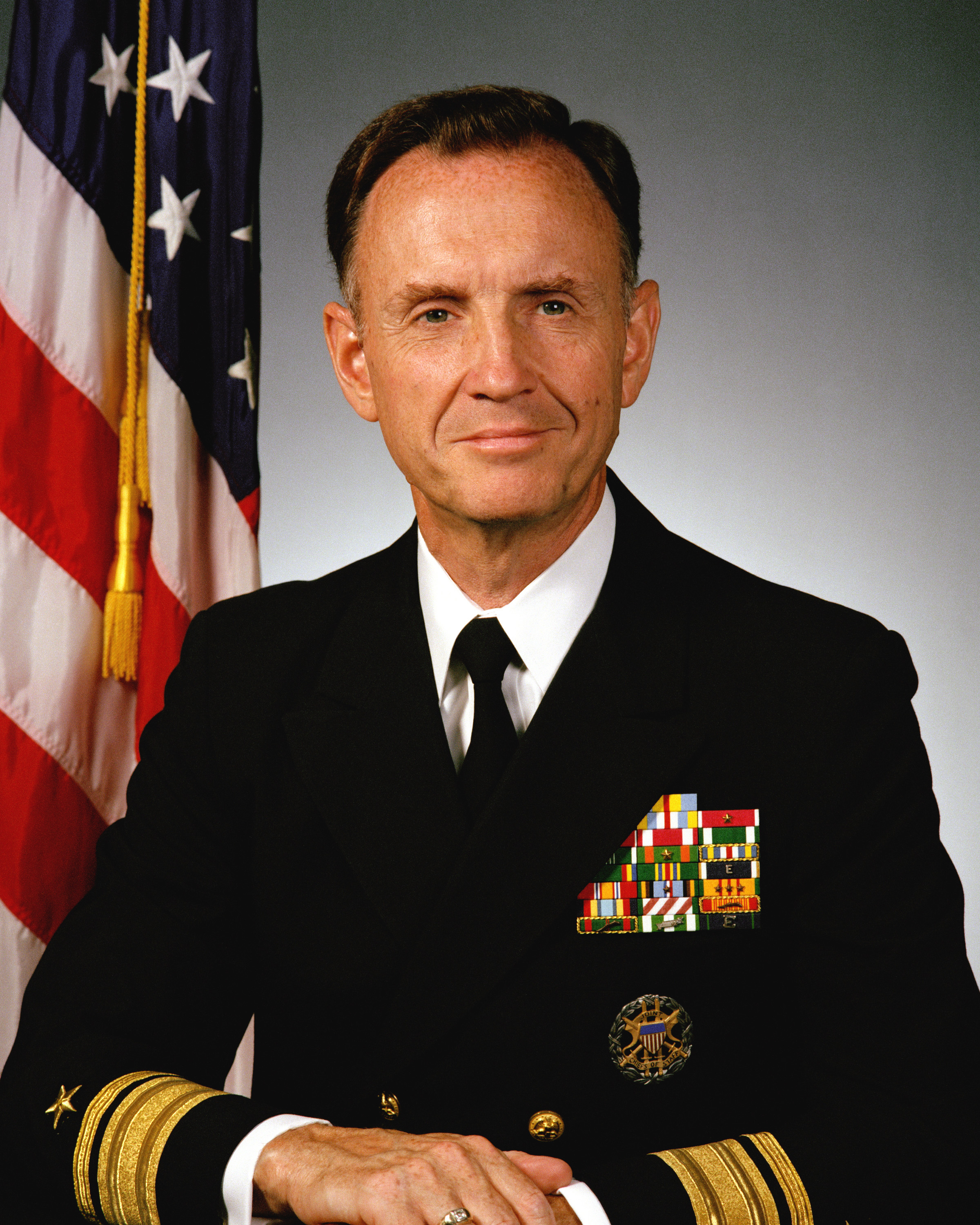
- Rear Adm. Thomas Aloysius Brooks III, as he was on 30 May 1991
- Allegiance: United States
- Branch: United States Navy
- Rank: Rear Admiral
- Commands: Director of Naval Intelligence

Thomas A. Brooks is a retired Rear-Admiral of the US Navy and past Director of Naval Intelligence, which office he led from 1988 to 1991.

== Biography ==
Brooks obtained his bachelor's degree from Fordham University and Masters degree from Fairleigh Dickinson University. He enlisted in the Naval Reserve and then came on active duty for the US Navy in 1958.

Admiral Brooks described what he considered to be a cover-up of the 1967 USS Liberty incident as a “national disgrace” and stated “The Navy was ordered to hush this up, say nothing, and allow the sailors to say nothing. The Navy rolled over and played dead.” On the 24th anniversary of the attack (in 1991), he presented approximately 50 Liberty survivors gathered at the White House with a Presidential Unit Citation that had been signed by President Lyndon B. Johnson but never awarded.

For a time he served as the Assistant Naval Attaché in Istanbul.

He was involved in the apprehension of the MS Achille Lauro terrorists, and in the 1986 United States bombing of Libya, by which Ronald Reagan taught Muammar Gaddafi not to bomb European discos. Unfortunately the latter did not take well to the lesson and ordered the 21 December 1988 bombing of Pan Am Flight 103, which exploded in mid-air and crashed on the town of Lockerbie in Scotland after a bomb detonated, killing all 259 people aboard, and 11 people in Lockerbie.

Brooks spent 33 years as a Naval Intelligence officer, and retired in 1991 after a three-year posting as George H. W. Bush's Director of Naval Intelligence.

Brooks then spent 10 years in private industry with AT&T.

In 1995, he was appointed to the Defense Policy Board.

He is a co-author of the first English-language book on Admiral Gorshkov: The Man Who Challenged the U.S. Navy.
