= Jan E. Tighe =

Jan Tighe
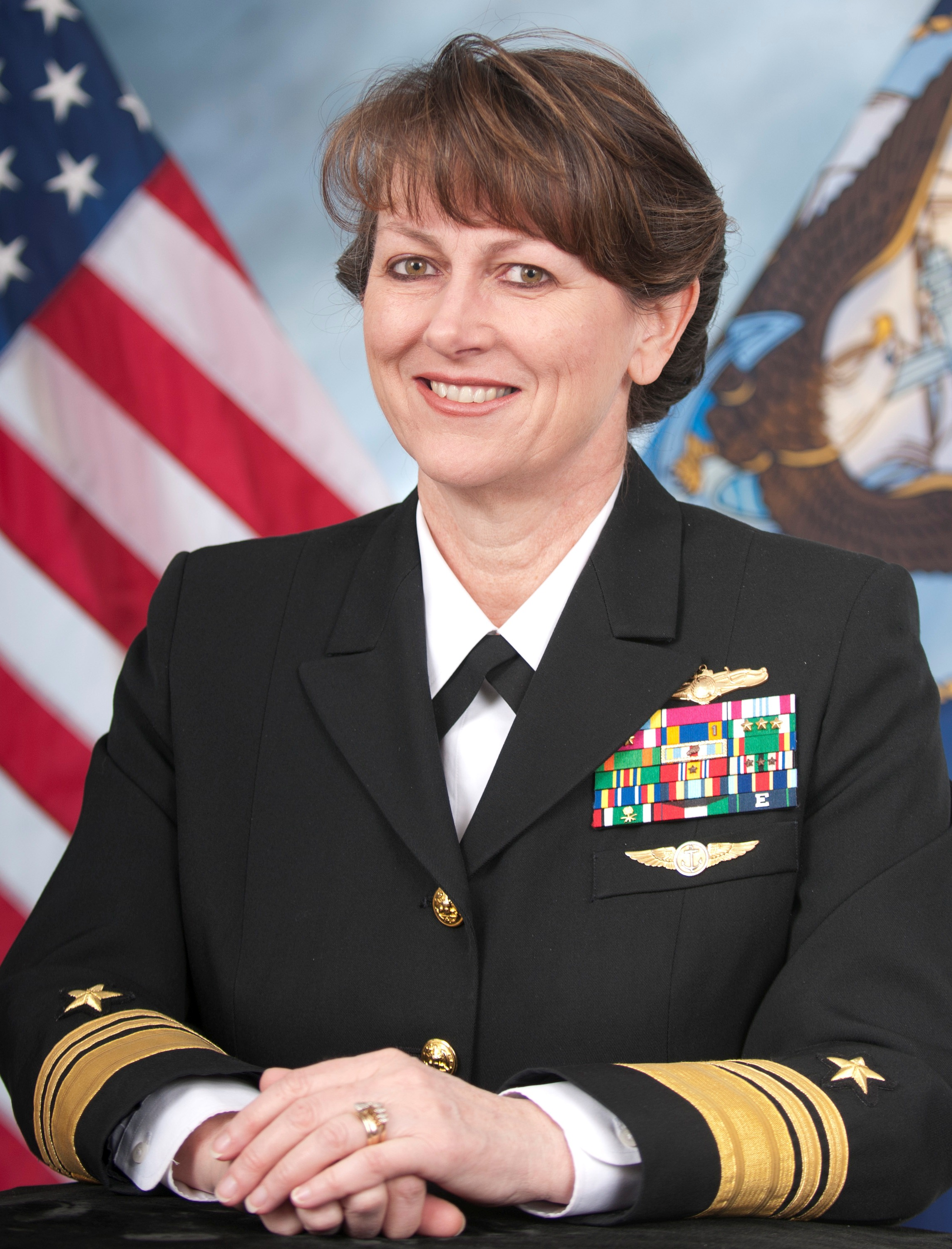
- Born: September 16, 1962 (age 64); Bowling Green, Kentucky, U.S.
- Military career
- Allegiance: United States
- Branch: United States Navy
- Service years: 1984–2018
- Rank: Vice Admiral
- Commands: Director of Naval Intelligence; United States Tenth Fleet; Fleet Cyber Command
- Conflicts: Gulf War
- Awards: Navy Distinguished Service Medal; Defense Superior Service Medal; Legion of Merit; Defense Meritorious Service Medal

Jan Elizabeth Tighe (born September 16, 1962) is a retired United States Navy vice admiral who served as Deputy Chief of Naval Operations for Information Warfare and 66th Director of Naval Intelligence from July 15, 2016, to July 2018. Prior to that, Tighe served as the Commander of the Tenth Fleet and Fleet Cyber Command. She became an independent director of Goldman Sachs in December 2018.

== Early life and education ==
Tighe was born in Bowling Green, Kentucky, and raised in Plantation, Florida. In 1984, she graduated from the United States Naval Academy and receive her commission as a cryptologist. She studied Russian at the Defense Language Institute, graduating in 2001 from the Naval Postgraduate School in Monterey, California, with a doctorate in electrical engineering and a M.Sc degree in applied mathematics.

== Naval career ==
Tighe's tours include Naval Security Group duty in Florida, Virginia and Japan, Fleet Air Reconnaissance Squadron 1 (VQ-1) and Naval Information Warfare Center Pacific. She was also assigned to the headquarters of the Pacific Fleet, Naval Security Group, Naval Network Warfare Command. She served as executive assistant to the Commander of the United States Cyber Command. She held command of over 2,800 multi-service and multi-agency personnel at the National Security Agency and Central Security Service of Hawaii in Kunia.

As a flag officer, Tighe served in various roles, including as commander and vice-admiral of the U.S. Fleet Cyber Command for two years, 2014–2016, and of the United States Tenth Fleet. She was a United States Cyber Command Deputy J3; N2N6 director of the Office of the Chief of Naval Operations (OPNAV); interim president of the Naval Postgraduate School; and deputy commander of the United States Fleet Cyber Command and United States Tenth Fleet.

In July 2016, Tighe became the deputy chief of Naval Information Warfare Systems Command, and the 66th director of the Office of Naval Intelligence. She retired from active duty in August 2018.

Tighe earned her Navy Information Warfare Specialist pin and Naval Aviation Observer wings, while deployed as an airborne special evaluator aboard a VQ-1 EP-3E aircraft in the Gulf War during Operation Desert Shield and Operation Desert Storm.

== Awards and decorations ==
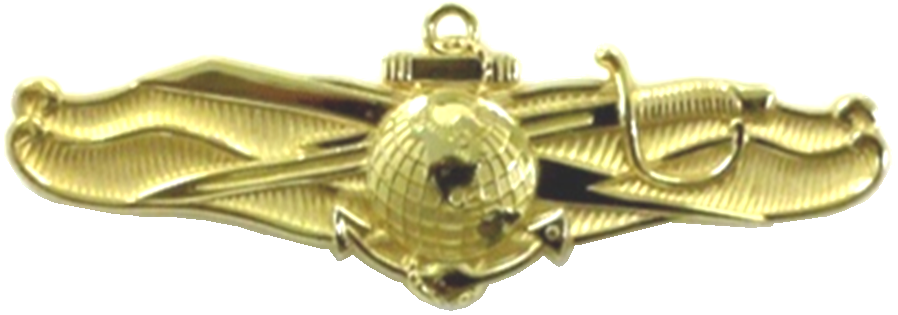
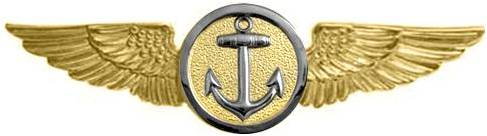
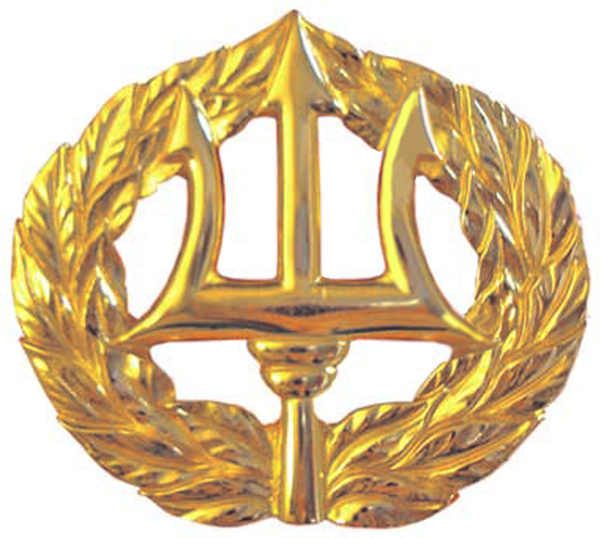
Information Dominance Warfare Officer Badge
Naval Aviation Observer Badge
Command Ashore insignia

Navy Distinguished Service Medal
Defense Superior Service Medal
Legion of Merit
Defense Meritorious Service Medal
Meritorious Service Medal with one gold award star
Air Medal with bronze Strike/Flight numeral 1
Navy Commendation Medal with three award stars
Navy Achievement Medal
Joint Meritorious Unit Award with one bronze oak leaf cluster
Navy Unit Commendation
Navy Meritorious Unit Commendation
National Defense Service Medal with one bronze service star
Southwest Asia Service Medal with three service stars
Global War on Terrorism Service Medal
Navy Sea Service Deployment Ribbon
Navy and Marine Corps Overseas Service Ribbon
Kuwait Liberation Medal (Saudi Arabia)
Kuwait Liberation Medal (Kuwait)
Navy Expert Pistol Shot Medal

Tighe is a member of the Acquisition Professionals Community and holds a Level III Defense Acquisition Workforce Improvement Act (DAWIA) certification in program management.

Military offices
Preceded by Michael S. Rogers	Commander of United States Tenth Fleet/Fleet Cyber Command; 2014–2016	Succeeded by Michael M. Gilday
Preceded by Ted N. Branch	Director of the Office of Naval Intelligence; 2016–2018	Succeeded by Matthew J. Kohler
