= Ted N. Branch =

US Navy vice-admiral

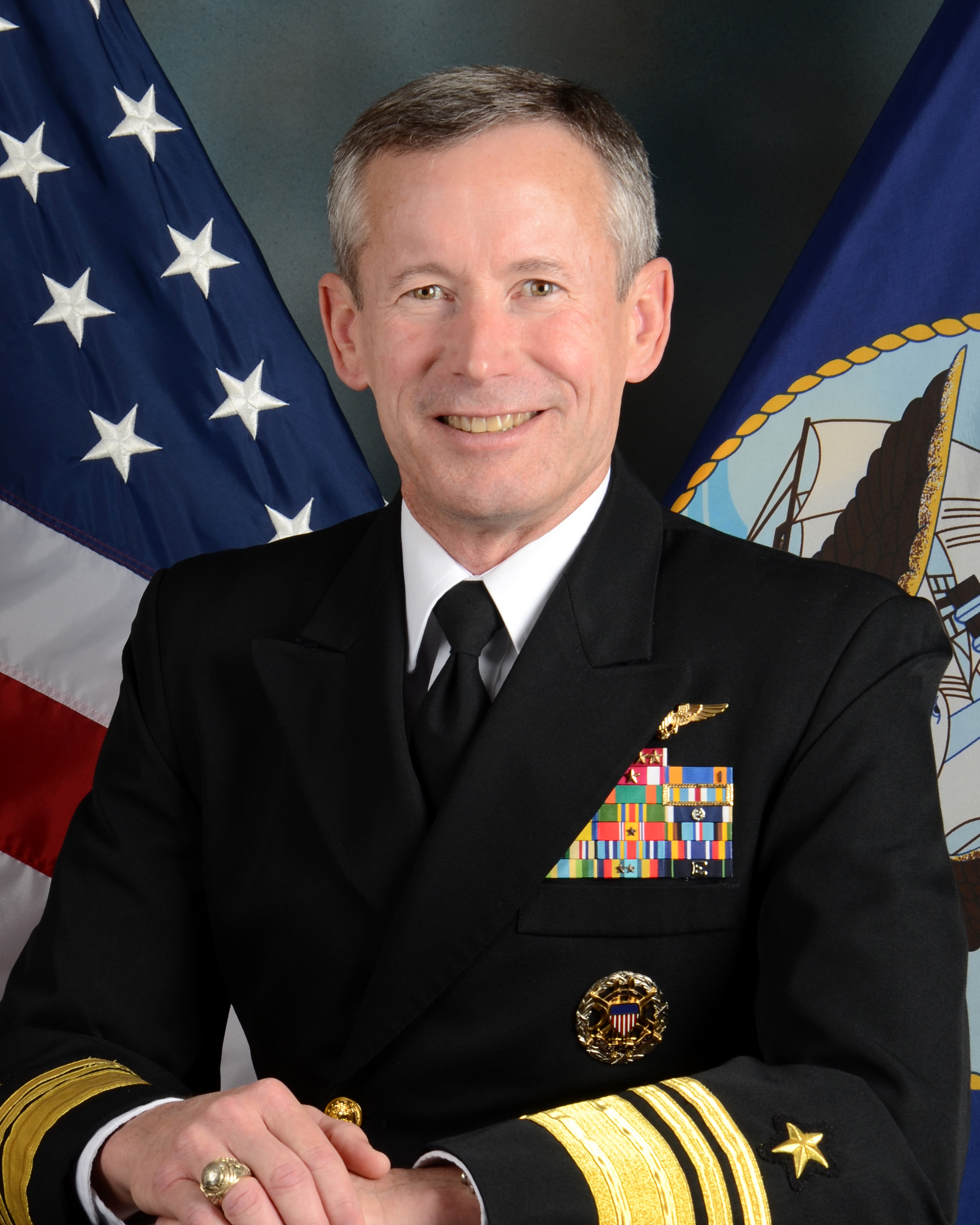
- Born: 28 November 1956 (age 69); Long Beach, Mississippi, U.S.
- Military career
- Allegiance: United States
- Branch: United States Navy
- Service years: 1979–2016
- Rank: Vice Admiral
- Nickname: Twig
- Commands: Office of Naval Intelligence; Naval Air Force Atlantic; Carrier Strike Group 1 USS Nimitz; USS Coronado; Strike Fighter Squadron 15
- Conflicts: Operation Southern Watch; Operation Urgent Fury; Operation Earnest Will; Operation Deliberate Force; Operation Iraqi Freedom; Operation Unified Response
- Awards: Navy Distinguished Service Medal; Legion of Merit (6)

Ted N. "Twig" Branch (born 22 April 1957) retired as a vice admiral in the United States Navy on 1 October 2016, after serving the last three years of his 37-year career as the Deputy Chief of Naval Operations for information warfare. In that capacity, he was the resource sponsor for the N2N6 portfolio which includes program investments for assured command and control, battlespace awareness, and integrated fires. He was the Navy's Chief Information Officer, the Director of Navy Cybersecurity, the leader of the Information Warfare Community, and the Director of Naval Intelligence. In November 2013, Branch was questioned by the Department of Justice regarding his role in the Glenn Defense Marine Asia investigation. As a result, the Secretary of the Navy suspended his access to classified information. After a three-year investigation by the Justice Department, Branch was cleared of all criminal charges. A separate Navy disciplinary review found that he had violated ethics rules by accepting minor gifts and attending a dinner hosted by the Glenn Defense.

== Education ==
- Bachelor of Science, United States Naval Academy, 1979
- Master of international relations, Naval War College

== Military career ==
Branch was a career naval aviator, flying A-7 Corsairs and F/A-18 Hornets. He has flown combat missions over Grenada, Lebanon, Bosnia-Herzegovina, and Iraq. He has served as the commanding officer of VFA-15 (Strike Fighter Squadron 15), the USS Coronado (AGF-11), the USS Nimitz (CVN 68), Carrier Strike Group One (Carl Vinson Strike Group), and Naval Air Force Atlantic. He has also served on the Joint Staff at the Pentagon.

As the commander of the USS Nimitz (CVN 68), then-Captain Branch was featured prominently in the Emmy award-winning documentary television series Carrier.

In January 2010, as the Commander of the Carl Vinson Strike Group, Branch led the initial US Navy response to the Haiti earthquake.

From February 2011 to July 2013, Branch served as the Commander of Naval Air Force, U.S. Atlantic Fleet, headquartered in Norfolk, Virginia. In that role he was responsible for manning, training, and equipping all elements of Naval Air Force, Atlantic – over 1000 aircraft, 40 thousand personnel, and six nuclear-powered aircraft carriers. While there, he also established the Interoperability Coordination Office for the United Kingdom's new aircraft carriers and the introduction of the F-35 aircraft.

On 16 May 2013, Branch was nominated by Secretary of Defense Chuck Hagel to become the Director of Naval Intelligence (DNI) and the Deputy Chief of Naval Operations (DCNO)for Information Dominance (later renamed Information Warfare). He was confirmed by the United States Senate in July 2013 and promoted to Vice Admiral (O-9).

While serving in the DCNO/DNI roles, he also took on the position of Directory of Navy Cybersecurity, becoming the Navy's leading proponent for cybersecurity. In this role, he stood up a year-long matrixed organization called Task Force Cyber Awakening to develop and implement Navy's cybersecurity strategy. That group developed the CYBERSAFE program to design and build in cyber resiliency, and inculcate an enhanced culture of cybersecurity throughout the U.S. Navy. When the Task Force completed their efforts, he stood up the Navy Cybersecurity Division within N2N6 so the process of instituting CYBERSAFE and a culture of cybersecurity could continue.

== Corruption scandal ==
On 8 November 2013, the Navy suspended Branch's access to classified information in connection with a Department of Justice investigation involving Singapore-based defense contractor, Glenn Defense Marine Asia. The investigation as to Branch involves a non-criminal accusation of "inappropriate conduct" associated with his acceptance of gifts from Glenn Marine during his tour as commanding officer of USS Nimitz on a western Pacific/Persian Gulf deployment in 2005. Although Branch remained in his post during the lengthy Justice Department investigation, his access to classified information remained suspended, relegating him to unclassified duties.

In September 2015, the Navy formally nominated Rear Admiral Elizabeth L. Train to succeed Branch as Director of Naval Intelligence.

In January 2016, the Washington Post reported that Branch was still functioning in his role, yet was "barred from reading, seeing or hearing classified information since November 2013", due to the suspension tied to the investigation.

On 1 April 2016, the Navy Times reported that the Navy had withdrawn Elizabeth Train's nomination to succeed Branch in favor of Vice Admiral Jan E. Tighe, previously commander of the Navy's Fleet Cyber Command and Commander, U.S. Tenth Fleet. Vice Admiral Tighe relieved Branch as Deputy CNO for Information Warfare/Director of Naval Intelligence in July 2016. Branch's access to classified information remained suspended until he retired.

Both the Navy and the Department of Justice cleared Branch of any wrongdoing in September 2017 and declined to prosecute Branch after a three-year investigation that resulted in no charges being brought. A Navy disciplinary review concluded that Branch had violated ethics rules by accepting gifts and accepting dinner from Leonard Francis. Branch received a letter reminding him of ethics rules and advising him from repeating the conduct.

== Military awards and decorations ==
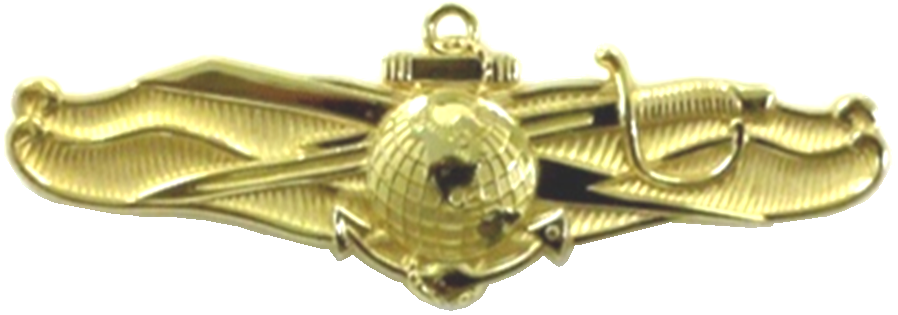
Information Dominance Warfare Officer Badge
Naval Aviator Wings
Command at Sea insignia
Office of the Joint Chiefs of Staff Identification Badge

Navy Distinguished Service Medal
Legion of Merit (with one silver award star)
Defense Meritorious Service Medal
Meritorious Service Medal (with one gold award star)
Air Medal with Strike/Flight numeral 1
Navy Commendation Medal (with two gold award stars and Combat V)
Navy Achievement Medal
Joint Meritorious Unit Award
Navy Unit Commendation Ribbon (with one bronze service star)
Navy Meritorious Unit Commendation Ribbon
Navy "E" Ribbon w/ Wreathed Battle E device (5 awards)
Navy Expeditionary Medal (with one bronze service star)
National Defense Service Medal (with one bronze service star)
Armed Forces Expeditionary Medal
Southwest Asia Service Medal
Global War on Terrorism Expeditionary Medal
Global War on Terrorism Service Medal
Armed Forces Service Medal
Navy Sea Service Deployment Ribbon (with silver and bronze service star)
Navy Expert Pistol Marksmanship Medal

Military offices
Preceded by Kendall L. Card	Director of the Office of Naval Intelligence; 2013–2016	Succeeded by Jan E. Tighe
