= Kendall L. Card =

American Navy aviator and flag officer

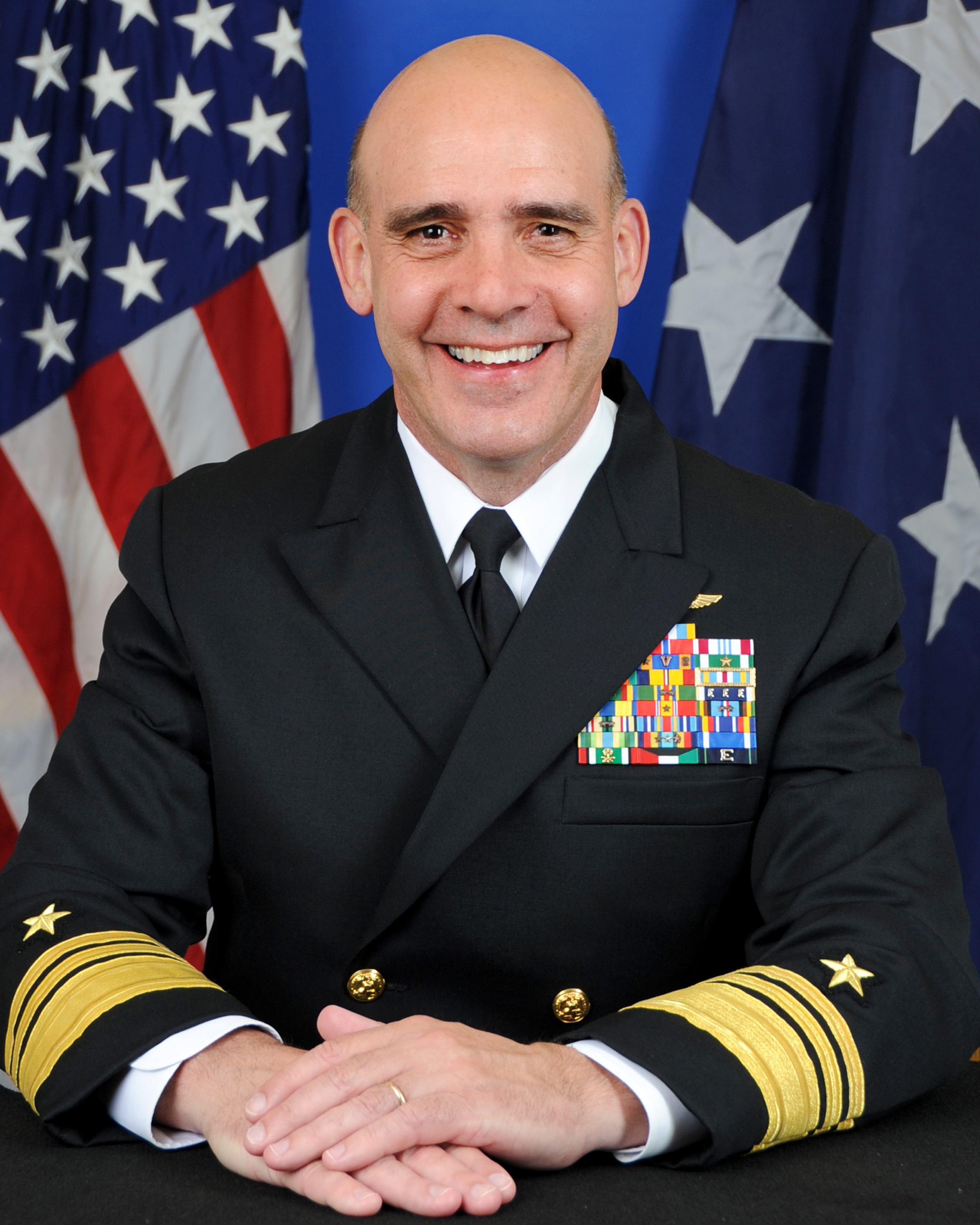
- Born: 15 July 1955 (age 71); Reeves County, Texas, U.S.
- Military career
- Allegiance: United States
- Branch: United States Navy
- Service years: 1977–2013
- Rank: Vice admiral
- Commands: USS Abraham Lincoln; USS Rainier; HS-15

Vice Admiral Kendall Lee Card (born 15 July 1955) is a retired United States Navy aviator and flag officer and the former Deputy Chief of Naval Operations for Information Dominance and Director of Naval Intelligence; succeeded by Vice Admiral Ted N. Branch in July 2013.

Card was born in Reeves County, Texas and raised in Fort Stockton. He graduated with a BS in mechanical engineering from Vanderbilt University in 1977. He is a graduate of the U.S. Naval Test Pilot School (USNTPS), where he also served as an Instructor Pilot in the mid-1980's.

From 1979, he made various operational tours at sea, flying off the decks of the carriers USS Forrestal (CV-59), USS America (CV-66), USS Theodore Roosevelt (CVN-71), USS Saratoga (CV-60) and USS Enterprise (CVN-65). He went on to command Helicopter Anti-submarine Squadron 15 (HS-15), as well as the USS Rainier (AOE-7) and the USS Abraham Lincoln (CVN-72). He accumulated over 3,900 flight hours in the SH-3H Sea King, SH-60F Seahawk, and the S-3A Viking aircraft. Under his command, the Abraham Lincoln took part in operations Enduring Freedom, Southern Watch, and Iraqi Freedom.

He was named a flag officer in 2006, and in June 2011 was named deputy chief of naval operations for information dominance and the 64th Director of Naval Intelligence, U.S. Navy.

== Awards and decorations ==

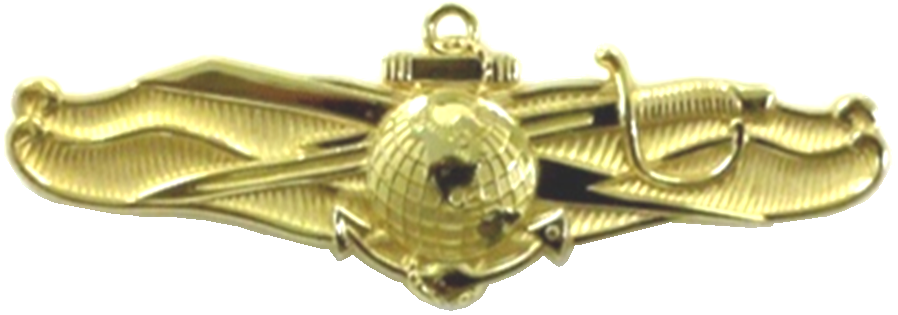

Naval Aviator Wings
Defense Superior Service Medal
Legion of Merit w/ 2 gold award stars	Bronze Star	Defense Meritorious Service Medal
Meritorious Service Medal w/ 2 award stars	Air Medal with bronze Strike/Flight numeral 2, "V" device and one bronze service star	Navy and Marine Corps Commendation Medal w/ award star
Navy and Marine Corps Achievement Medal	Combat Action Ribbon	Joint Meritorious Unit Award
Navy Unit Commendation w/ 2 service stars	Navy Meritorious Unit Commendation w/ 2 service stars	Navy "E" Ribbon with 3 Battle E devices
Navy Expeditionary Medal	National Defense Service Medal with service star	Armed Forces Expeditionary Medal with 2 service stars
Southwest Asia Service Medal with 2 service stars	Global War on Terrorism Expeditionary Medal	Global War on Terrorism Service Medal
Armed Forces Service Medal	Navy Sea Service Deployment Ribbon w/ 1 silver and 2 bronze service stars	NATO Medal for the former Yugoslavia
Kuwait Liberation Medal (Saudi Arabia)	Kuwait Liberation Medal (Kuwait)	Navy Expert Pistol Shot Medal
Information Dominance Warfare Officer Badge

Card was made a Commander of the Brazilian Order of Naval Merit in June 2012. He was also awarded the National Intelligence Distinguished Service Medal.

== Personal ==
Card is the son of Cecil Dennis Card (1 October 1927 – 12 August 2015) and Joyce Elaine (Kuykendall) Card. He has a brother and a sister.

Card married Becky Lynn Broyles on 20 August 1977 in Pecos County, Texas. They have two children and six grandchildren.

Military offices
Preceded by David J. Dorsett	Director of the Office of Naval Intelligence; 2011–2013	Succeeded by Ted N. Branch
