= David J. Dorsett =

Corporate vice president of Northrop Grumman

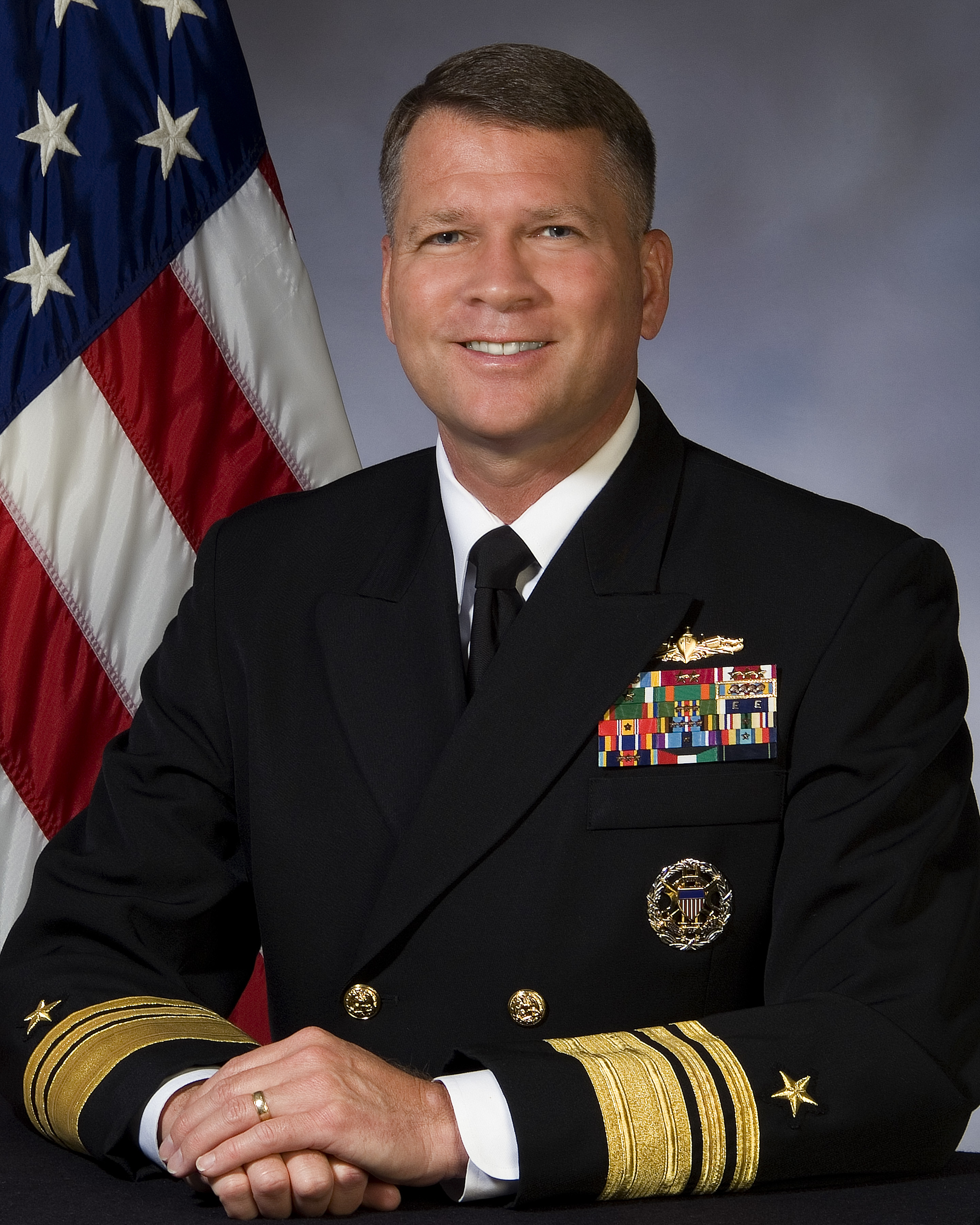
- Vice Admiral Dorsett, USN; 1st DCNO for Information Dominance / 63rd Director of Naval Intelligence
- Born: 8 October 1956 (age 70); Roanoke Rapids, North Carolina, U.S.
- Military career
- Allegiance: United States of America
- Branch: United States Navy
- Service years: 1978–2011
- Rank: Vice admiral
- Nickname: Jack
- Commands: Deputy Chief of Naval Operations for Information Dominance; Director of Naval Intelligence; Director for Intelligence (J2), U.S. Joint Staff; Director of Intelligence (J2), United States Pacific Command; Commander, Joint Intelligence Center, U.S. Central Command
- Conflicts: Operation Southern Watch; Operation Restore Hope; Operation Desert Fox; Operation Resolute Response; Operation El Dorado Canyon; Operation Attain Document; Operation Prairie Fire
- Awards: National Intelligence Distinguished Service Medal; Defense Superior Service Medal (4); Legion of Merit (3); Meritorious Service Medal (4); Navy and Marine Corps Commendation Medal (2); Navy and Marine Corps Achievement Medal

David John "Jack" Dorsett (born 8 October 1956) is a corporate vice president at Northrop Grumman, and a retired vice admiral of the U.S. Navy. He was the first Deputy Chief of Naval Operations for Information Dominance and 63rd Director of Naval Intelligence. He served as the Director of Intelligence, Joint Chiefs of Staff from 2005 to 2008 prior to assuming his position on the Chief of Naval Operations staff.

== Early life and education ==
Dorsett was born in Roanoke Rapids, North Carolina, and raised in Virginia. He graduated from Jacksonville University (Florida) in 1978, receiving a bachelor's degree in political science. He was also the 2008 Distinguished Alumni for Jacksonville University.

Jack Dorsett is a naval intelligence officer, joint specialty officer, a specialist in Joint and Strategic Intelligence, and a qualified surface warfare officer. He possesses significant experience in National Security Affairs (Europe, Middle East, Asia) and in Strategic Planning. He graduated with distinction from the U.S. Naval War College and Armed Forces Staff College, and was awarded a master's degree from the Defense Intelligence College. He has also attended executive business programs at Babson College and the University of North Carolina's Kenan-Flagler Business School.

== Military service ==
He was commissioned in the US Navy in 1978 and previously served as an exchange midshipman with the Royal Navy, serving on the Ton-class minesweeper HMS Gavinton. His early career included duty in the destroyers USS Elliot, USS Oldendorf, and as executive officer in the minesweeper USS Dominant.

From 1983 to 1987, he served as an intelligence analyst and operations officer at FOSIC U.S. Naval Forces Europe, providing intelligence support during Operations El Dorado Canyon, Attain Document, and Prairie Fire. In 1987, he reported to Sixth Fleet as political-military officer and deputy assistant chief of staff for intelligence.

He transferred to the U.S. Naval War College in 1989, serving as executive assistant for the Chief of Naval Operations's (CNO) Strategic Studies Group. He then served as the intelligence officer in the aircraft carrier USS Ranger, participating in Operations Southern Watch and Restore Hope. From 1993 to 1996, he directed the Operational Intelligence/Crisis Management Department at the Joint Intelligence Center Pacific.

In 1996, Dorsett transferred to Washington, D.C., where he directed the CNO's Intelligence Plot and then served as director of intelligence, Office of Naval Intelligence. From 1998 to 1999, he served as the assistant chief of staff for intelligence on the COMUSNAVCENT/COMFIFTHFLT staff, and participated in Operations Desert Fox, Southern Watch, Resolute Response, and other sensitive, nationally tasked combat and special operations.

Dorsett commanded the Joint Intelligence Center (JICCENT), U.S. Central Command between 1999 and 2001, where he managed intelligence support to theater forces during Operations Southern Watch and Determined Response. In June 2001, he assumed duties as the director of intelligence, surveillance and reconnaissance requirements and resources on the OPNAV staff. He was selected for promotion to rear admiral (lower half) in May 2003 and assigned as the special assistant to the Director of Naval Intelligence; in July 2005 he reported to the Joint Staff as the director for intelligence (J2). He was selected for promotion to rear admiral (upper half).

As a flag officer, he served as special assistant to the Director of Naval Intelligence; director of Intelligence (J2), United States Pacific Command; director for Intelligence (J2), U.S. Joint Staff; and was the 63rd Director of Naval Intelligence (N2), Chief of Naval Operations. On 2 November 2009, Dorsett assumed office as the 1st Deputy Chief of Naval Operations for Information Dominance (OPNAV N2/N6).

== Establishment of the Information Dominance Corps ==
In response to the CNO's direction, Dorsett spearheaded the formation of the Information Dominance Corps (IDC)—a cadre of information specialists—consisting of more than 45,000 active and Reserve Navy officers, enlisted and civilian professionals possessing extensive skills in information-intensive fields. These specialists include information professional officers, information warfare officers, naval intelligence officers, meteorological and oceanography officers, space cadre officers, cyber engineer officers, aerographer's mates, cryptologic technicians, intelligence specialists, information systems technicians, and civilian personnel.

The stand up of N2/N6 represents a landmark transition in the evolution of naval warfare, designed to elevate information as a main battery of the Navy's warfighting capabilities, and firmly establish the U.S. Navy's prominence in intelligence, cyber warfare, and information management.

== As DCNO for Information Dominance ==
On 31 October 2009, the CNO established the office of the Deputy Chief of Naval Operations for Information Dominance (OPNAV N2/N6) and on 2 November 2009, Dorsett assumed duties as the 1st Deputy Chief of Naval Operations for Information Dominance.

=== Unmanned initiatives ===
Under Dorsett, the Navy made significant progress in building a network of unmanned systems that will perform ISR, communication relay, strike, and other missions.

- The Navy and Air Force signed a memorandum of agreement to maximize commonality and eliminate redundancies between the Global Hawk and the Broad Area Maritime Surveillance (BAMS) unmanned aircraft systems (UAS) programs. The Navy is transitioning from NUCAS-D to the Unmanned Carrier Launched Airborne Surveillance and Strike (UCLASS) system to provide unmanned carrier-based capability by 2018. Additionally, the Vertical Take-Off Unmanned Aerial Vehicle Fire Scout has completed several software and technical modifications and efforts have been initiated to weaponize and provide a radar capability for maximum warfighter effectiveness. The Medium Range Maritime UAS (MRMUAS) Initial Operational Capability (IOC) is currently 2019, two years ahead of normal programmatic benchmarks. MRMUAS was cancelled in 2012.

=== Networking initiatives ===
- Dorsett has directed the Navy's networks become an interlinked family of systems rather than stand-alone information silos. His goal is to create a series of interconnected sensors working together to provide commanders with improved situational awareness of the battlespace allowing decision superiority over the adversary. The objective is for every platform to be a sensor, for every sensor to be networked, and for every shooter to be capable of using data derived from any sensor.
- N2/N6 is focusing efforts on aligning programs, to include transitioning from Navy Marine Corps Intranet (NMCI) to the Next Generation Enterprise Network (NGEN), OCONUS Navy Enterprise Network (ONE-NET), and Consolidated Afloat Networks and Enterprise Services (CANES), ultimately establishing a seamless environment between the afloat and ashore environments.

=== Accelerating electronic warfare capabilities ===
The Navy has begun to restore its EW advantage and develop world-class cyber warfare capabilities to tackle future threats. To that end, the Next Generation Jammer (NGJ) Analysis of Alternatives concluded in April 2010.

=== Cyber warfare initiatives ===
Dorsett articulated the need establish the FLTCYBERCOM / TENTHFLT to coordinate globally and serve as the Navy Component Commander to U.S. Cyber Command.

=== Maritime domain awareness (MDA) ===
- The CNO's emphasis has been on operationalizing MDA – making it real for the Navy, a regular part of the way the Navy does business. Accordingly, Dorsett increased the number of analysts focusing on nontraditional types of warfare, such as narcotics and counterterrorism analysis. He also invested heavily in technologies to bring together data, to connect the dots and make associations between vessels, cargo and people to better understand intent. These investments are being fielded around the world at U.S Maritime Operations Centers, the Office of Naval Intelligence, and Coast Guard Maritime Intelligence Fusion Centers.

=== Northrop Grumman ===
At Northrop Grumman, he serves as the company's primary liaison for cyber and command, control, communications and computer programs and manages corporate-wide interfaces with key officials of the U.S. government's executive branch and Congress, advises on major program initiatives, and facilitates development of strategic concepts and marketing solutions. In this role, he has facilitated development of company-wide strategic concepts and customer engagement on issues that include: command and control of cyber and non-kinetic effects; assured communications; and, integrated electronic warfare solutions.

Dorsett also serves on the board of the Naval Intelligence Professionals and is a member of the Armed Forces Communications and Electronics Association (AFCEA) and the Intelligence and National Security Alliance (INSA).

== Awards and decorations ==
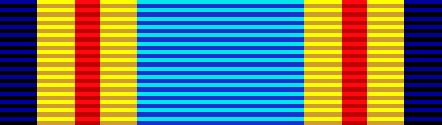
Defense Superior Service Medal (4)
Legion of Merit (3)
Meritorious Service Medal (4)
Navy and Marine Corps Commendation Medal (2)
Navy and Marine Corps Achievement Medal
Joint Meritorious Unit Award (7)
Navy Unit Commendation Ribbon
Navy Meritorious Unit Commendation Ribbon (5)
National Intelligence Distinguished Service Medal
DIA Director's Award
Navy "E" Ribbon (3)
National Defense Service Medal (2)
Armed Forces Expeditionary Medal (5)
Southwest Asia Service Medal (1)
Global War on Terrorism Service Medal
Humanitarian Service Medal (2)
Navy Sea Service Deployment Ribbon (6)
Navy Overseas Service Ribbon (4)
Kuwait Liberation Medal
Navy Expert Pistol Shot Award

- NSA Bronze Medallion

Badges

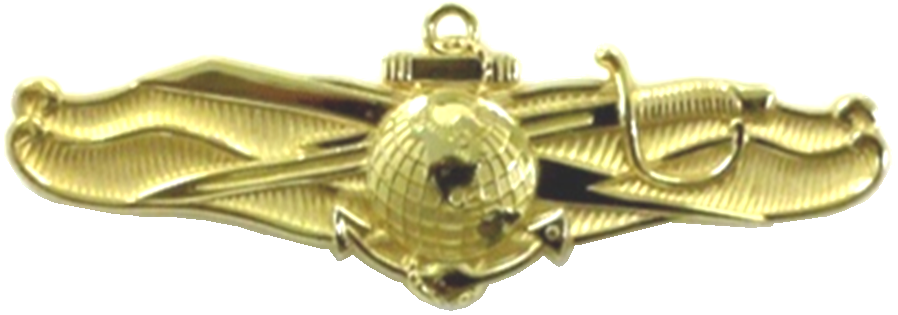
- Navy Information Dominance Corps Warfare Badge (Officer)
- Navy Surface Warfare Badge (Officer)
- Office of the Joint Chiefs of Staff Identification Badge

== Sources ==
Military offices
Preceded by Tony L. Cothron	Director of the Office of Naval Intelligence; 2008–2011	Succeeded by Kendall L. Card
