= RMS St Helena =

At least two ships have borne the name RMS St Helena:

- RMS St Helena (1963)
- RMS St Helena (1989)
