= Makati Shangri-La, Manila =

Hotel in Makati, Philippines

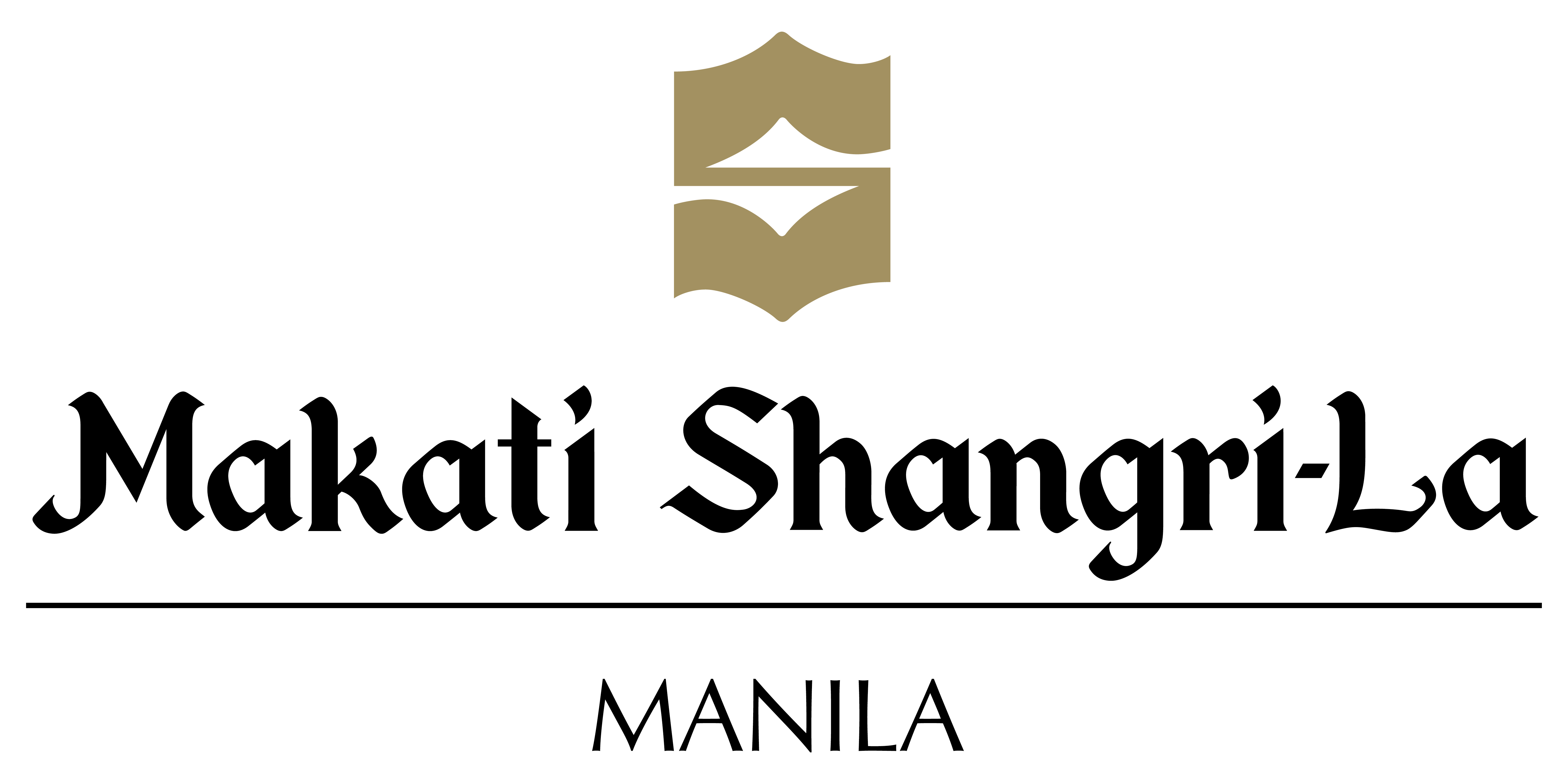

- Makati Shangri-La as seen from Makati Avenue
- Interactive map of the Makati Shangri-La, Manila area

General information
- Status: Completed
- Type: Hotel
- Location: Ayala Avenue corner Makati Avenue, Makati 1200, Philippines
- Coordinates: 14.5548°N 121.0244°E
- Opening: April 27, 1993; 32 years ago August 8, 2023; 2 years ago (reopening)
- Renovated: 2001-2002, 2009
- Closed: February 1, 2021; 5 years ago (temporary closure)
- Owner: Shangri-La Hotels
- Management: Greg Findlay

Technical details
- Floor count: 28

Design and construction
- Architecture firm: Kanko Kikaku Sekkeisha, Yozo Shibata & Association (Tokyo); G. Formoso & Partners (Manila)

Website
- www.shangri-la.com/manila/makatishangrila

Makati Shangri-La, Manila is a hotel located in Makati and one of the three hotels managed by Shangri-La Hotels and Resorts in Metro Manila, Philippines. Opened on April 27, 1993, the hotel had 696 rooms and suites at the time of its temporary closure in 2021; the hotel reopened more than two years later, on August 8, 2023.

== History ==
Makati Shangri-La entrance

The Makati Shangri-La is built on the lot formerly occupied by Rizal Theater, a performing arts theater and cinema designed by Juan Nakpil, a National Artist of the Philippines for Architecture. The hotel had its soft opening on April 27, 1993, with its grand launch held months later in August of the same year. It was built by the Ayala family to keep the area as Manila's luxury address. Originally it was opened with 703 rooms over its 28 floors, at a cost of $118 million.

The hotel underwent several renovations over the years, including three restaurant overhauls and the refurbishing of more than 200 rooms in 2001 with fiber optic cabling and broadband internet. The cost per room of the 2001 renovation was around $30,000. The entire renovation, which continued until the end of 2002, cost $130 million.

The Rizal Ballroom was renovated in 2009. A second ballroom named "Isabela" was opened in November 2013 with an aim to provide a modern event space with interchangeable furniture and audiovisual technology.

In 2010, the hotel embarked on a program called "Green Housekeeping" in order to reduce the use of chemicals and improve cleanliness, with initiatives like low-temperature washing and lower electricity use. The same year it was the first hotel in the Philippines to equip its concierge team with iPads.

In 2013, the hotel reportedly achieved an average 80 percent occupancy, most of which were corporate clients such as the United States Embassy.

=== Temporary closure and eventual reopening ===
The hotel was forced to close on February 1, 2021, due to financial losses caused by the COVID-19 pandemic, and thus initiated a mass layoff of its staff. It previously ceased operations for a brief period in early 2020 due to the lockdowns imposed by the national government, but the hotel was allowed to operate again after quarantine restrictions were eased. Despite the closure, its two-level Shangri-La Retail Arcade, which hosts retail and office spaces at the ground and second levels, remained open. The hotel reopened on August 8, 2023.

== Design and construction ==
The hotel was designed by Kanko Kikaku Sekkeisha, Yozo Shibata & Association (Tokyo) & G. Formoso & Partners (Manila), both companies of which have designed multiple Shangri-La properties. During the 2002 renovations, General Manager Richard Riley directed and designed the amenities. The design team included specialists from the US, Hong Kong, Singapore and Tokyo, including Bilky Llinas, Leese Robertson Freeman Ltd., Warner Wong, Wilson Associates, BUZdesign, Adam Tihany, and Alan Chang.

== See also ==
- Shangri-La Hotels and Resorts
