= Perry M. Ratliff =

Perry Michael Ratliff (born 1947) is an officer of the United States Navy and a former director of Naval Intelligence. Since retiring from active duty with the Navy, Mike Ratliff served as Executive Director of the American Civic Literacy Program, and, since 2004, first as Executive Director and then President of the Jack Miller Center, a non-profit educational foundation (see below).

== Education ==
Mike Ratliff graduated from Towson University in 1968. He was a Fulbright Scholar at the London School of Economics, as well as a Woodrow Wilson Fellow at the Johns Hopkins University. In 1997 he was a Capstone fellow at the National Defense University. Towson University has honored Rear Admiral Ratliff as both a distinguished graduate and with a Doctor of Letters degree.

== Initial training ==
Mike Ratliff enlisted in the Naval Reserve while a graduate student at Johns Hopkins University in July 1969. Upon completion of his study as a Woodrow Wilson Fellow he reported for active duty to Officer Candidate School in Newport, Rhode Island. He was commissioned an ensign and designated an intelligence officer in March 1971.

=== Tours ===
His initial operational assignment was on board William C. Lawe (DD-763) in the Indian Ocean, South Atlantic, and Caribbean. He was subsequently assigned to the Fleet Intelligence Center, US Naval Forces Europe, and then reported to the Navy Field Operational Intelligence Office in Washington, D.C. In June 1977 he returned to sea with Commander, United States Sixth Fleet, on board Albany (CA-123). In 1979 he reported to the Commander-in-Chief Atlantic as a CINC briefer and team chief. He then was assigned to Monterey for nine months of Japanese language training en route to assignments in the Pacific. Initially he served with Commander United States Forces Japan, and then he was assigned as N2, United States Third Fleet on board Coronado (AGF-11).

Returning to the Atlantic, Commander Ratliff was assigned as Director of Current Intelligence for the United States Atlantic Command. Following a year in the Pentagon on the staff of the Chief of Naval Operations, he returned to the Atlantic Command as Special Assistant to the J2.

In August 1992, upon promotion to the rank of captain, he was assigned as Commanding Officer, Fleet Ocean Surveillance Information Facility, Rota, Spain. He subsequently returned to Washington D.C., where he was first Director of Intelligence within the Office of Naval Intelligence and then Executive Assistant to the Director of Naval Intelligence. Selected for Rear Admiral (lower half), he returned to the Asia-Pacific region as Director for Intelligence with the Commander-in-Chief, United States Pacific Command. In 1999 he returned to Washington, where he once again served on the Chief of Naval Operations (CNO) staff, this time as the 58th Director of Naval Intelligence.

=== Present day ===
Ratliff is now President of the Jack Miller Center (JMC), located in Philadelphia, Pennsylvania, which provides support for university and college professors working to strengthen education in American history and institutions. The JMC provides support to a national community of more than 630 professors, who teach at more than 190 colleges and universities, as well as a network of over 50 institutionally recognized partner programs such as the Yale Center for the Study of Representative Institutions focused on increasing student access to quality courses in areas such as American history and political thought. In addition, the center conducts academic conferences that allow scholars to explore a range of subjects, such as how higher education might respond to the special needs of immigrants. In 2008 the JMC launched a $10 million National Postdoctoral Fellowship Initiative that by 2013 already had provided more than 100 fellowships to help young professors just starting.

To provide an outlet for the scholarship from this growing community of scholars, as well as others interested in advancing the understanding of the ideas that shape American institutions, the JMC partnered with the University of Chicago Press to establish American Political Thought, a peer reviewed journal edited by Michael Zuckert of the University of Notre Dame. In order to expand its support for this education, the JMC seeks to interest donors in supporting both its own programs as well as the partner centers on various campuses, and Mike Ratliff contributed an article to the 2011 volume, Teaching America, The Case for Civic Education, on "donor intent."

== Awards ==
Ratliff's awards include the Legion of Merit (2 awards), Defense Meritorious Service Medal, and the Meritorious Service Medal (2 awards).
