= Gene F. Price =

U.S. Navy admiral

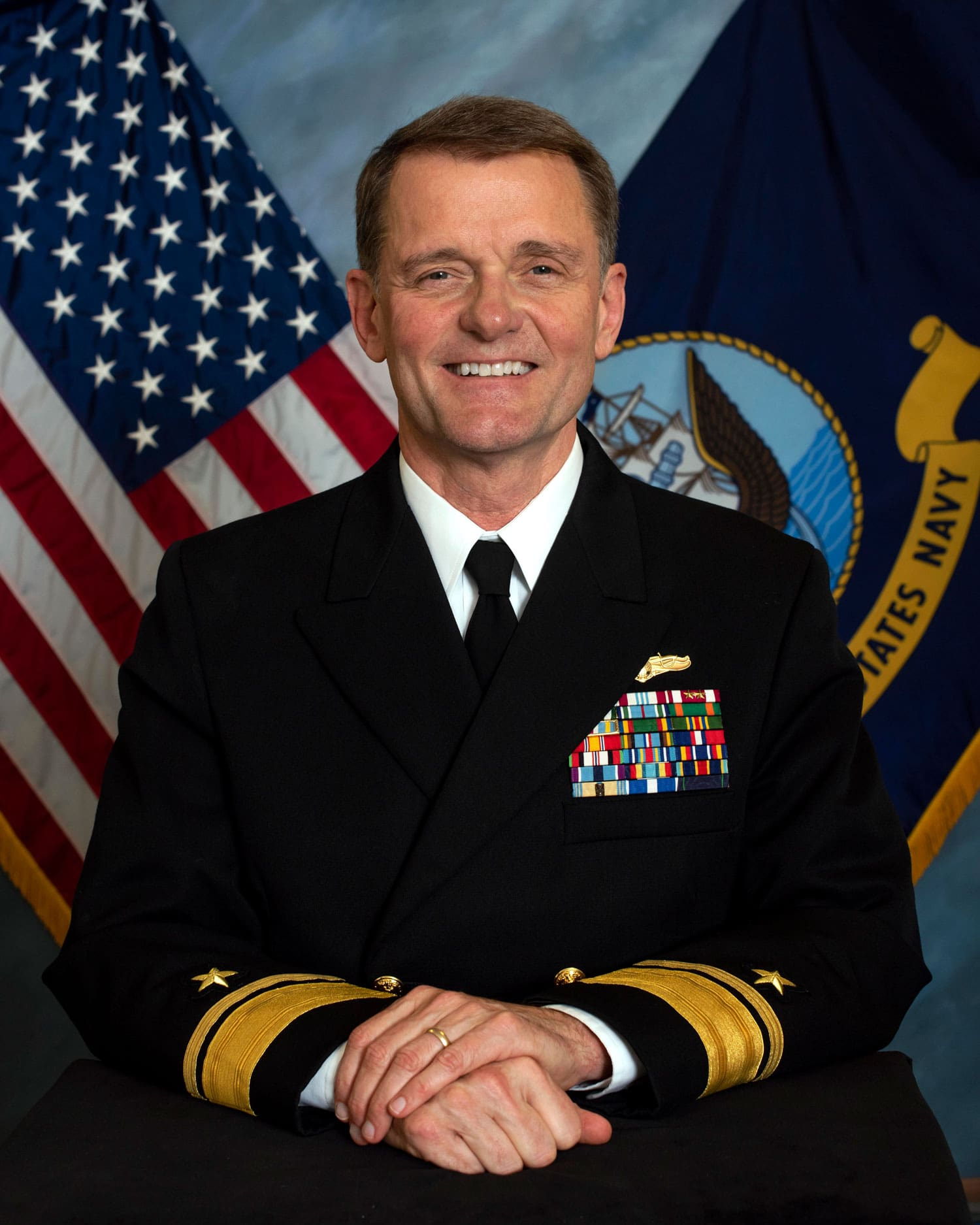
- Military career
- Allegiance: United States
- Branch: United States Navy
- Service years: 1986–2022
- Rank: Rear Admiral
- Commands: National Maritime Intelligence-Integration Office; Office of Naval Intelligence; Naval Information Force Reserve; Navy Intelligence Reserve Region Southeast

Gene Forrest Price is a retired United States Navy rear admiral who last served as Reserve Deputy Commander of the Naval Information Forces from 2017 to 2022, and dual-hatted as Commander of the Naval Information Force Reserve from 2017 to 2020. He served as interim Director of the National Maritime Intelligence-Integration Office and interim Commander of the Office of Naval Intelligence from January 24, 2019, to June 17, 2019, and again from May 3, 2021, to June 18, 2021.

Price earned a B.A. degree from the University of Louisville in 1980. He was commissioned as an intelligence officer in 1986. Price later received his J.D. degree from the Louis D. Brandeis School of Law at the University of Louisville in 1988.

Military offices
Preceded by ???	Deputy Commander of the U.S. Fleet Cyber Command and the United States Tenth Fleet; 2015–2017	Succeeded by Michael A. Brookes
Preceded by Robert D. Sharp	Director of the National Maritime Intelligence-Integration Office and Commander of the Office of Naval Intelligence; Acting; January 2019–June 2019; May 2021–June 2021	Succeeded by Kelly Aeschbach
Preceded by Kelly Aeschbach	Director of the National Maritime Intelligence-Integration Office and Commander of the Office of Naval Intelligence; Acting; January 2019–June 2019; May 2021–June 2021	Succeeded by Curt Copley
Preceded by Daniel J. McDonnell	Commander of the Naval Information Force Reserve; 2017–2020	Succeeded by James M. Butler
Preceded by Daniel J. McDonnell	Reserve Deputy Commander of the Naval Information Forces; 2017–2022	Succeeded by Gregory K. Emery
Vacant
