= Curt Copley =

U.S. Navy admiral, Navy SEAL

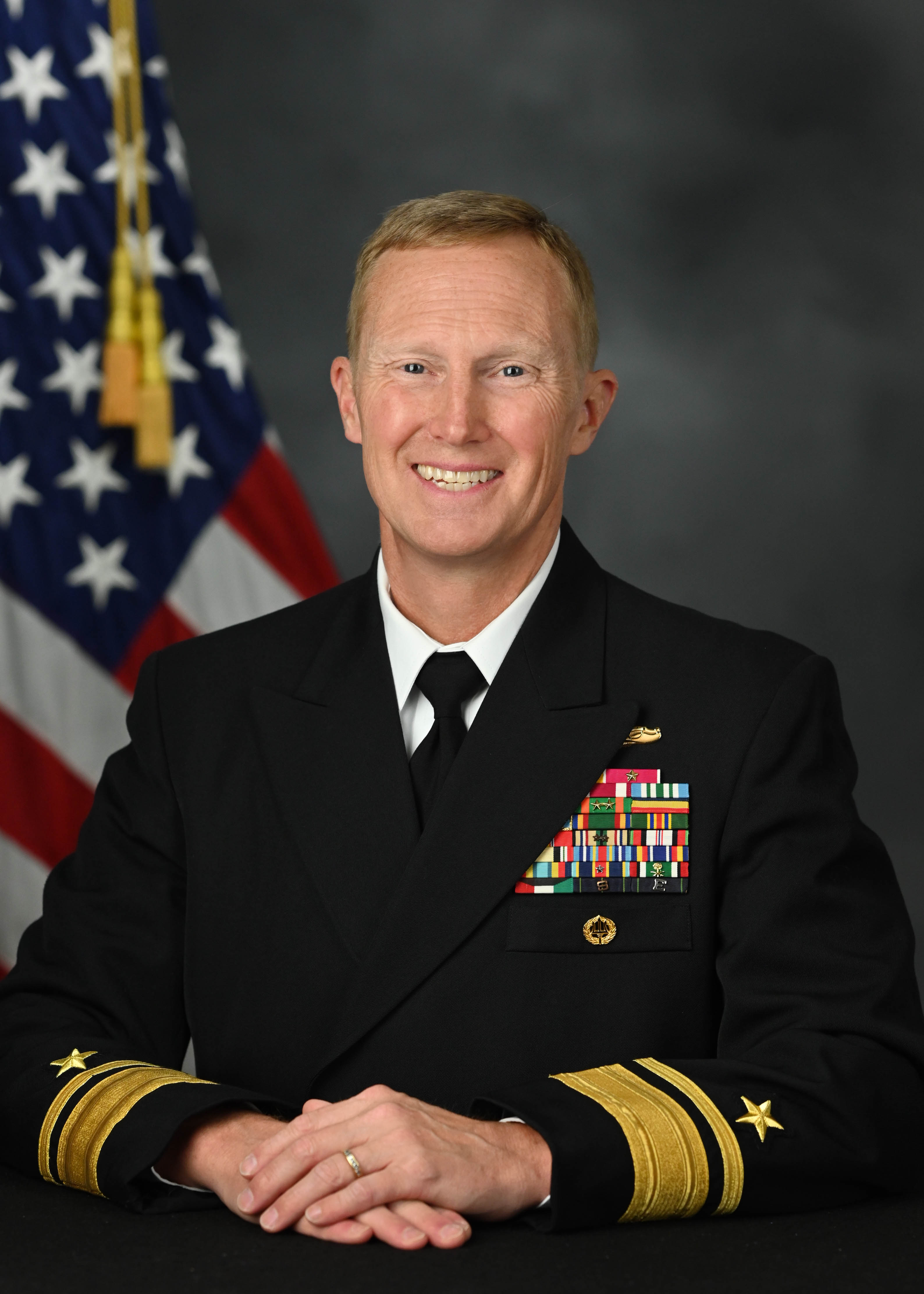
- Born: 1966 (age 59–60)
- Education: United States Naval Academy (BS)
- Military career
- Allegiance: United States
- Branch: United States Navy
- Service years: 1988–2022
- Rank: Rear Admiral
- Commands: National Maritime Intelligence-Integration Office; Office of Naval Intelligence
- Awards: Defense Superior Service Medal; Legion of Merit (2)

Ronald Curt Copley (born 1966) is a retired United States Navy rear admiral and information warfare specialist who last served as director of the National Maritime Intelligence-Integration Office and commander of the Office of Naval Intelligence from June 18, 2021 to August 1, 2022. He previously served as deputy director of operations for combat support of the National Security Agency from 2019 to 2021. Copley graduated from the United States Naval Academy in 1988 with a B.S. degree in mechanical engineering and was commissioned as an intelligence officer.

Military offices
Preceded by Timothy J. White	Deputy Chief for Tailored Access Operations of the National Security Agency; 201?–2016	Succeeded by Steve Parode
Preceded by Steve Parode	Director of Intelligence of the United States Strategic Command; 2016–2018	Succeeded by Kelly Aeschbach
Preceded by ???	Deputy Director of Operations for Combat Support of the National Security Agency; 2019–2021	Succeeded by Thomas K. Hensley
Preceded by Gene F. Price; Acting	Director of the National Maritime Intelligence-Integration Office and Commander of the Office of Naval Intelligence; 2021–2022	Succeeded by Michael W. Studeman
