= United States Cyber Corps =

United States Cyber Corps, the U.S military cyber forces, may refer to:

== Current units ==
- United States Cyber Command (USCYBERCOM)
- Twenty-Fourth Air Force (AFCYBER)
- United States Army Cyber Command (ARCYBER)
- Cyber Branch (United States Army)
- U.S. Fleet Cyber Command
- Marine Corps Cyberspace Command (MARFORCYBER)

== Defunct units ==
- Air Force Cyber Command (Provisional)
- U.S. Navy Cyber Forces (CYBERFOR)

== See also ==
- Information Warfare Corps (U.S. Navy)
- Cyberwarfare in the United States
