= Robert D. Sharp =

American Navy admiral

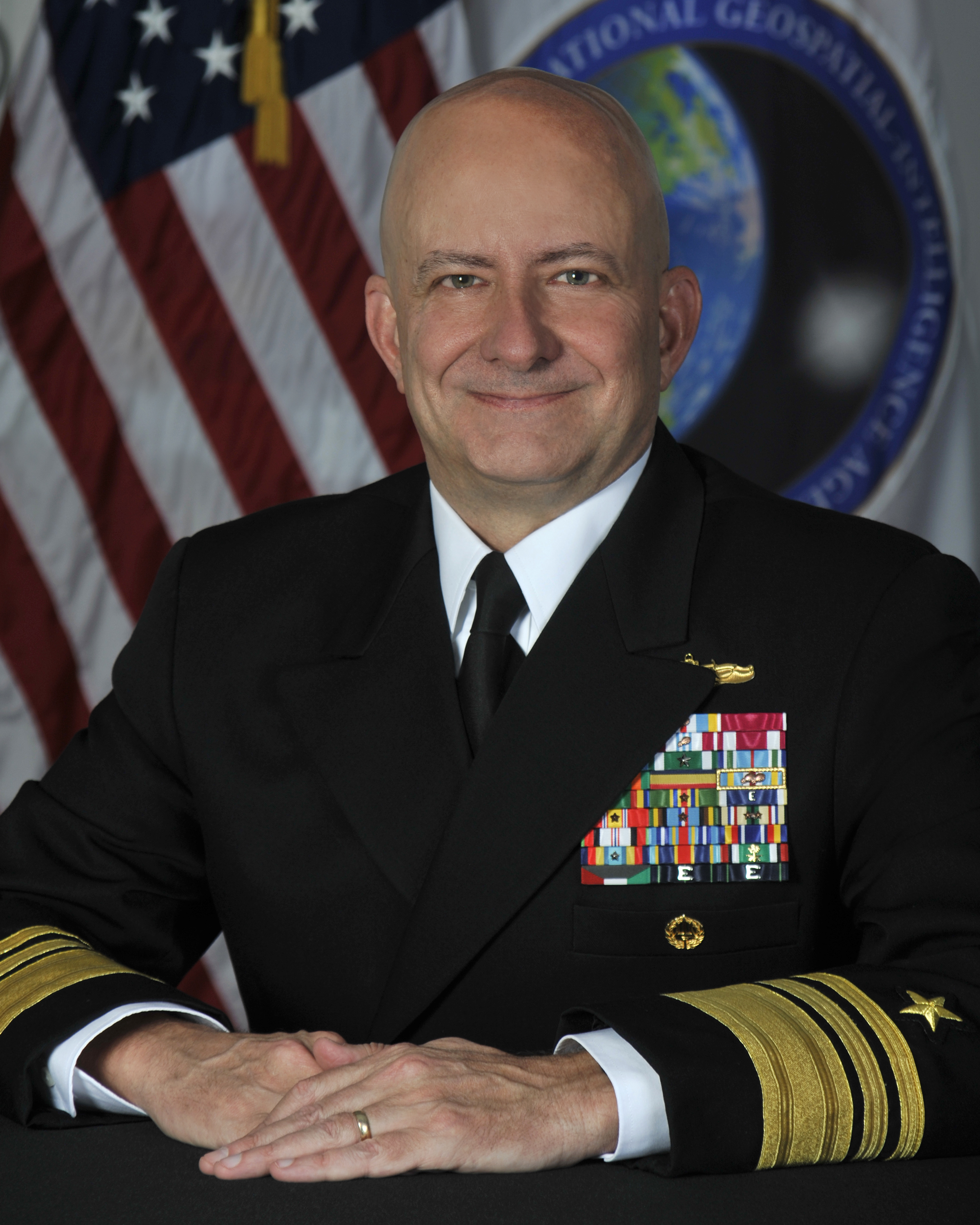
- Official portrait, 2019

7th Director of the National Geospatial-Intelligence Agency
- In office February 7, 2019 – June 3, 2022
- President: Donald Trump; Joe Biden
- Deputy: Stacey Dixon (2019–2021); Tonya Wilkerson (2021–2022)
- Preceded by: Robert Cardillo
- Succeeded by: Frank D. Whitworth III

Personal details
- Education: University of the Pacific

Military service
- Allegiance: United States
- Branch/service: United States Navy
- Years of service: 1988–2022
- Commands: National Maritime Intelligence-Integration Office; Office of Naval Intelligence
- Battles/wars: Gulf War; War in Afghanistan
- Awards: Navy Distinguished Service Medal; Defense Superior Service Medal (2); Legion of Merit; Bronze Star Medal (2)

Robert "Bob" D. Sharp is a retired United States Navy admiral who last served as the 7th Director of the National Geospatial-Intelligence Agency.

== Early life ==
A native of San Jose, California, Sharp graduated from the University of the Pacific with a Bachelor of Arts in English and was commissioned through Officer Candidate School in 1988. He holds a Naval War College diploma and earned a Master of Science in National Resource Strategy from the Industrial College of the Armed Forces in 2008.

== Naval career ==
From April 2016 to February 2019, Sharp served as Commander, Office of Naval Intelligence; and Director, National Maritime Intelligence-Integration Office. During his initial flag assignment he served as the Director for Intelligence (J2), United States Special Operations Command.

He retired from active duty in 2022.

== Accolades ==
In addition to multiple personal, unit, and campaign awards, Sharp has been the recipient of the Vice Admiral Rufus L. Taylor award for excellence in instruction, the United States Army's Knowlton Award for Military Intelligence, the Rear Adm. Edwin T. Layton leadership award, and the Naval Intelligence Foundation award for excellence in operational intelligence support to the Fleet.

=== Awards and decorations ===
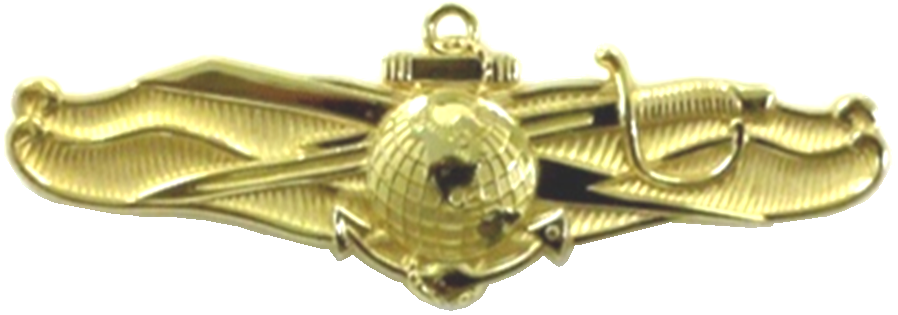

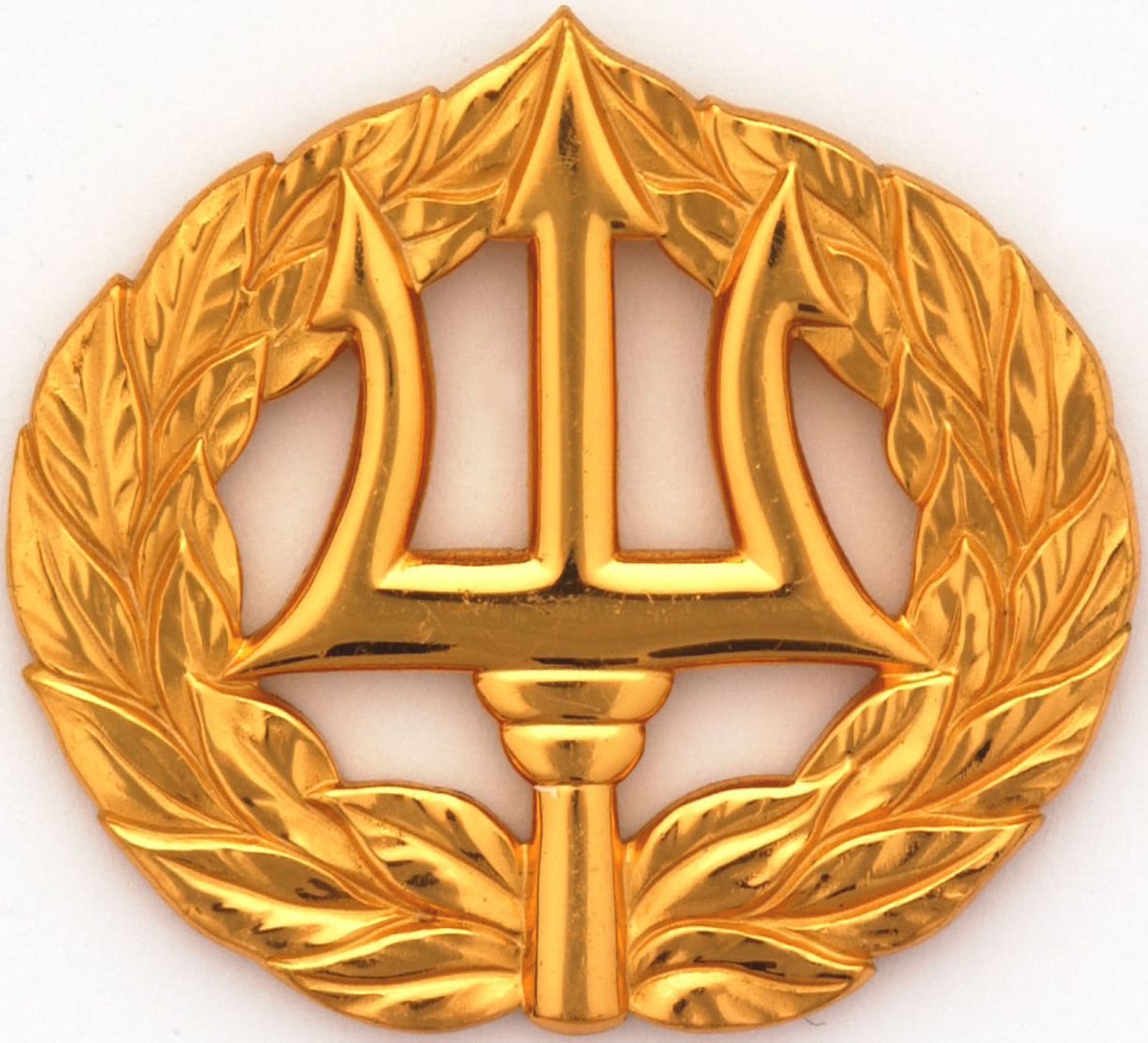

Information Warfare Dominance Officer insignia
Navy Distinguished Service Medal	Defense Superior Service Medal with bronze oak leaf cluster	Legion of Merit
Bronze Star Medal with gold award star	Defense Meritorious Service Medal with bronze oak leaf cluster	Meritorious Service Medal
Joint Service Commendation Medal	Navy and Marine Corps Commendation Medal with award star	Joint Service Achievement Medal
Navy and Marine Corps Achievement Medal	Navy and Marine Corps Presidential Unit Citation	Joint Meritorious Unit Award with two bronze oak leaf clusters
Navy Unit Commendation	Navy Meritorious Unit Commendation with bronze service star	Navy "E" Ribbon, 1st award
National Defense Service Medal with bronze service star	Armed Forces Expeditionary Medal with service star	Southwest Asia Service Medal with two bronze service stars
Afghanistan Campaign Medal	Global War on Terrorism Expeditionary Medal	Global War on Terrorism Service Medal
Navy Sea Service Deployment Ribbon with silver service star	Navy and Marine Corps Overseas Service Ribbon	Kuwait Liberation Medal (Saudi Arabia)
Kuwait Liberation Medal (Kuwait)	Navy Expert Rifleman Medal	Navy Expert Pistol Shot Medal
Navy Command Ashore insignia
National Geospatial-Intelligence Agency Badge

Military offices
Preceded by ???	Director of Intelligence of the United States Special Operations Command; 201?–2016	Succeeded by Gary W. Johnston
Preceded by Elizabeth L. Train	Director of the National Maritime Intelligence-Integration Office and Commander of the Office of Naval Intelligence; 2016–2019	Succeeded by Kelly Aeschbach
Government offices
Preceded by Robert Cardillo	Director of the National Geospatial-Intelligence Agency; 2019–2022	Succeeded by Frank D. Whitworth III
