= Kelly Aeschbach =

United States Navy Vice Admiral

Kelly A. Aeschbach
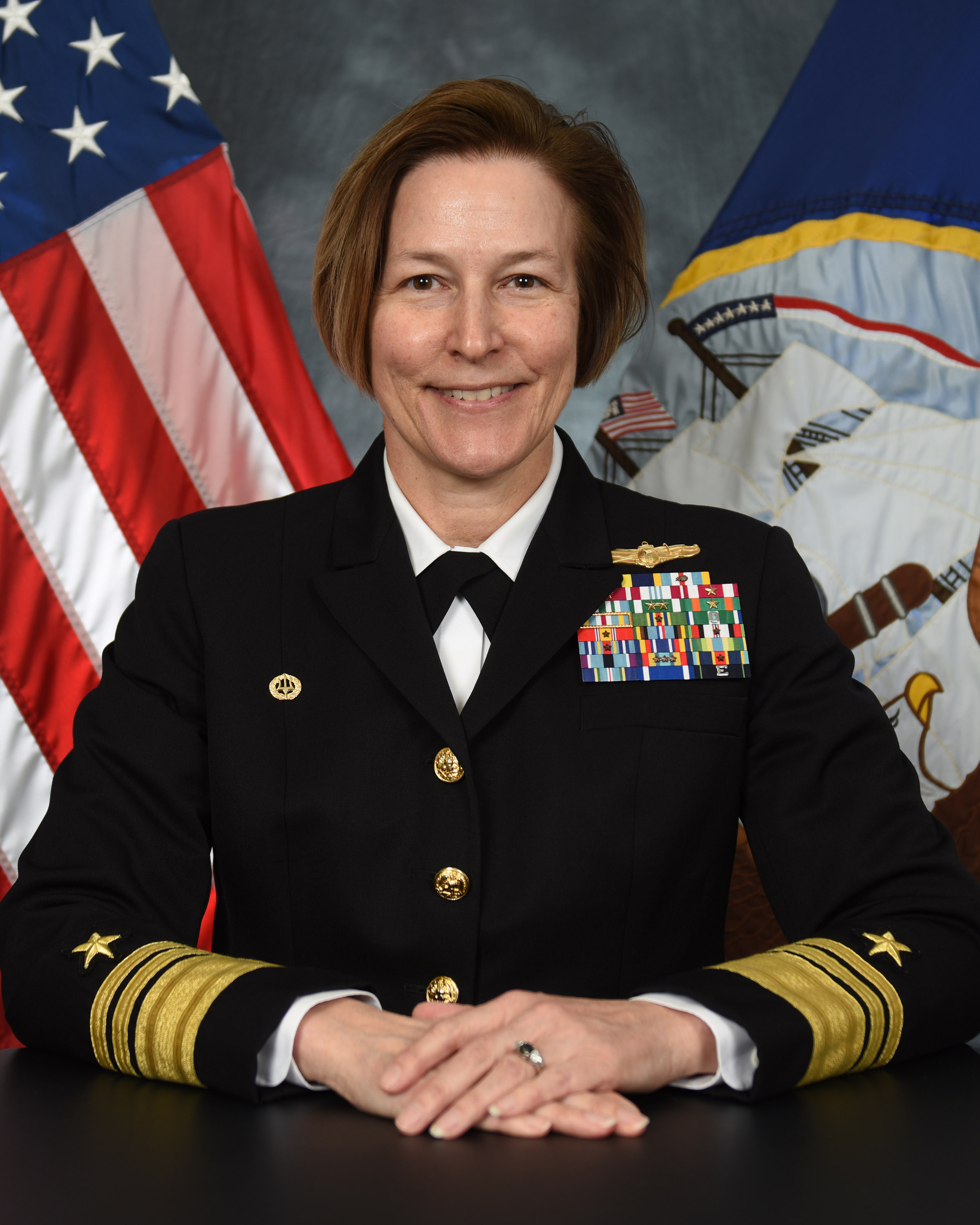
- Official portrait, 2024
- Born: August 5, 1968 (age 58)
- Branch: United States Navy
- Service years: 1990–2024
- Rank: Vice Admiral
- Commands: Naval Information Forces; Office of Naval Intelligence; National Maritime Intelligence-Integration Office; Naval Computer and Telecommunications Area Master Station Atlantic; Patrol Squadron (VP) 6
- Awards: Distinguished Service Medal; Defense Superior Service Medal; Legion of Merit
- Education: George Washington University

Kelly A. Aeschbach is a retired United States Navy vice admiral who last served as the commander of Naval Information Forces from 2021 to 2024. Before that, she served as Director of the National Maritime Intelligence-Integration Office and Commander of the Office of Naval Intelligence. and prior to that as Deputy Director of Intelligence for United States Forces – Afghanistan.

== Education and early career ==
Kelly Aeschbach was born on August 5, 1968 and graduated from George Washington University in 1990 with a degree in International Affairs. During her studies, she participated in Naval ROTC and upon graduation, became a naval intelligence officer. She later earned an MBA from San Diego State University in 1998.

Aeschbach has participated in several military operations during her service, including Patrol Squadron (VP) 6, where she was deployed to Adak, Alaska, and Okinawa, Japan. She also served on Amphibious Squadron 1, where she was deployed to the Western Pacific and the Persian Gulf. She also participated in Operation Enduring Freedom, the official U.S. government name for the Global War on Terrorism, with Carrier Strike Group 9, and Headquarters, Resolute Support, Afghanistan.

Her ashore assignments have included Joint Intelligence Center Pacific in Aiea, Hawaii; Tactical Training Group Pacific in San Diego; Naval Personnel Command in Millington, Tennessee; U.S. Naval Forces Europe in London; U.S. Special Operations Command in Tampa, Florida. She also served as a military fellow at the Office of the Director of National Intelligence in McLean, Virginia, in the Office of the Chief of Naval Operations staff at the Pentagon, and Naval Information Forces in Suffolk, Virginia.

== Leadership roles ==
From 2013 to 2015, Aeschbach served as the commanding officer for Naval Computer and Telecommunications Area Master Station Atlantic in Norfolk. She subsequently became Chief of Staff for the Naval Information Forces. In September 2016, President Barack Obama recommended that Aeschbach be promoted to the rank of Rear Admiral.

Not long after, Aeschbach became the Deputy Director of Intelligence for the entire United States Armed Forces in Afghanistan. In this capacity, she spoke at the 2017 anniversary of the Pearl Harbor attacks. "For 76 years, we've remembered Pearl Harbor. We've remained vigilant. And today's armed forces are ready to answer the alarm bell", she was quoted as saying. In her current role, Aeschbach seeks to prevent further such attacks from occurring by helping to lead US efforts in "information warfare".

In April 2021, Aeschbach was nominated for promotion to vice admiral and reassignment as commander of U.S. Naval Information Forces. She was subsequently relieved as director of the NMIO and commander of the ONI by Rear Admiral Gene F. Price on May 3, 2021. She relieved Vice Admiral Brian B. Brown as commander of NAVIFOR on May 7, 2021.

== Awards ==
- Defense Superior Service Medal
- Legion of Merit
- Defense Meritorious Service Medal
- Meritorious Service Medal
- Navy and Marine Corps Commendation Medal
- Navy Achievement Medal.

Military offices
Preceded by Curt Copley	Director of Intelligence of the United States Strategic Command; 2018–2019	Succeeded by Michael A. Brookes
Preceded by Robert D. Sharp	Director of the National Maritime Intelligence-Integration Office; 2019–2021	Succeeded by Gene F. Price
Preceded by Robert D. Sharp	Commander of the Office of Naval Intelligence; 2019–2021	Succeeded by Gene F. Price
Preceded by Brian B. Brown	Commander of Naval Information Forces; 2021–2024	Succeeded by Michael Vernazza
