= Frank D. Whitworth =

U.S. Navy admiral

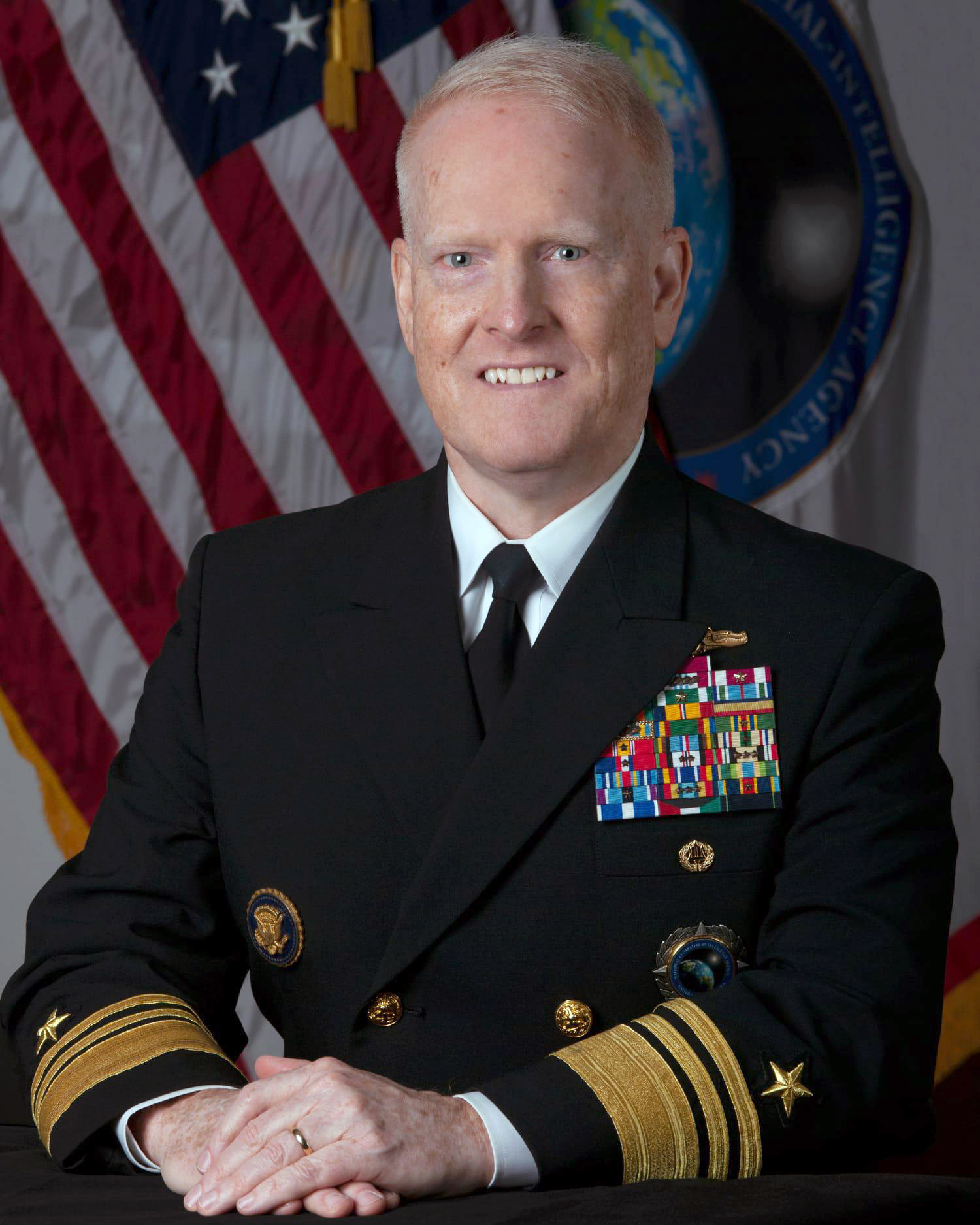
- Official portrait, 2022

8th Director of the National Geospatial-Intelligence Agency
- Incumbent
- Assumed office 3 June 2022 - 5 November 2025
- President: Joe Biden
- Deputy: Tonya Wilkerson
- Preceded by: Robert D. Sharp

Personal details
- Born: 17 June 1967 (age 58) Richmond, Virginia, U.S.
- Relations: Darse Crandall (brother-in-law)
- Education: Duke University (BA); Georgetown University (MA)

Military service
- Branch/service: United States Navy
- Years of service: 1989–2025
- Rank: Vice Admiral
- Commands: National Geospatial-Intelligence Agency; Joint Intelligence Center, U.S. Central Command; Kennedy Irregular Warfare Center
- Awards: Defense Superior Service Medal (3); Legion of Merit; Bronze Star (4); Defense Meritorious Service Medal (5)

Frank Dixon "Trey" Whitworth III (born 17 June 1967) is a retired United States Navy vice admiral and career intelligence officer who served as the eighth director of the National Geospatial-Intelligence Agency from 2022 June 3 to 2025 November 5. He most recently served as the Director for Intelligence of the Joint Staff.

== Early life and education ==
Born in Richmond, Virginia, Whitworth is a 1989 graduate of Duke University, where he earned a Bachelor of Arts in political science. He holds a Master of Arts in National Security Studies from Georgetown University, as well as a Diploma from the Naval War College in Newport, Rhode Island.

== Military career ==
Whitworth's command tours included Commander, Joint Intelligence Center Central; commanding officer, Navy Element of U.S. Central Command; and commanding officer, Kennedy Irregular Warfare Center.

Whitworth's operational tours included director of intelligence for U.S. Africa Command, director of intelligence for Joint Special Operations Command, director of intelligence and deputy director of Maritime Operations Center for Commander, U.S. Naval Forces Central Command, U.S. Fifth Fleet; director of intelligence for a Special Operations Task Force in Afghanistan during three deployments supporting Operation Enduring Freedom; director of intelligence for Naval Special Warfare Development Group; special assistant for Political-Military Affairs at U.S. Sixth Fleet during Operation Allied Force; indications and warning Officer at U.S. Naval Forces Central Command, U.S. Fifth Fleet, in support of Operation Desert Storm; and intelligence officer for Fighter Squadron 31 during USS Forrestal's deployment in support of Operation Provide Comfort.

Whitworth's shore-based tours included the National Security Agency as chief of targets for the U.S. Central Command area of responsibility; Navy federal executive fellow to American Enterprise Institute; senior duty officer at the White House Situation Room; intelligence briefer for the Chief of Naval Operations and Secretary of the Navy; and intelligence watch analyst at the Office of Naval Intelligence and the National Military Joint Intelligence Center.

In July 2021, he was nominated and confirmed for promotion to vice admiral. He was promoted to his present rank on 30 July 2021.

== Awards and decorations ==
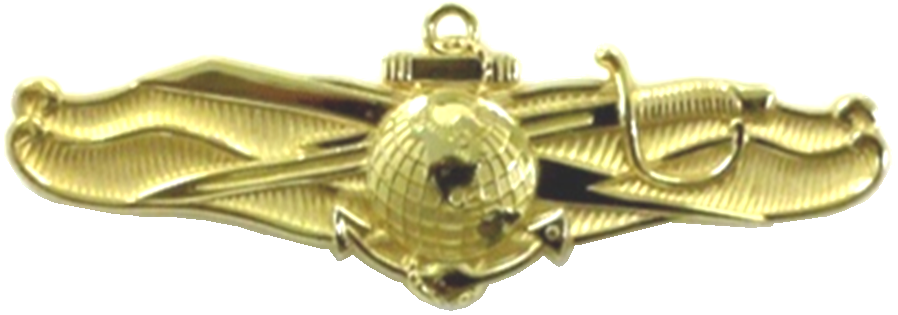

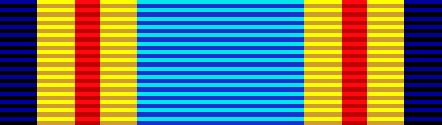

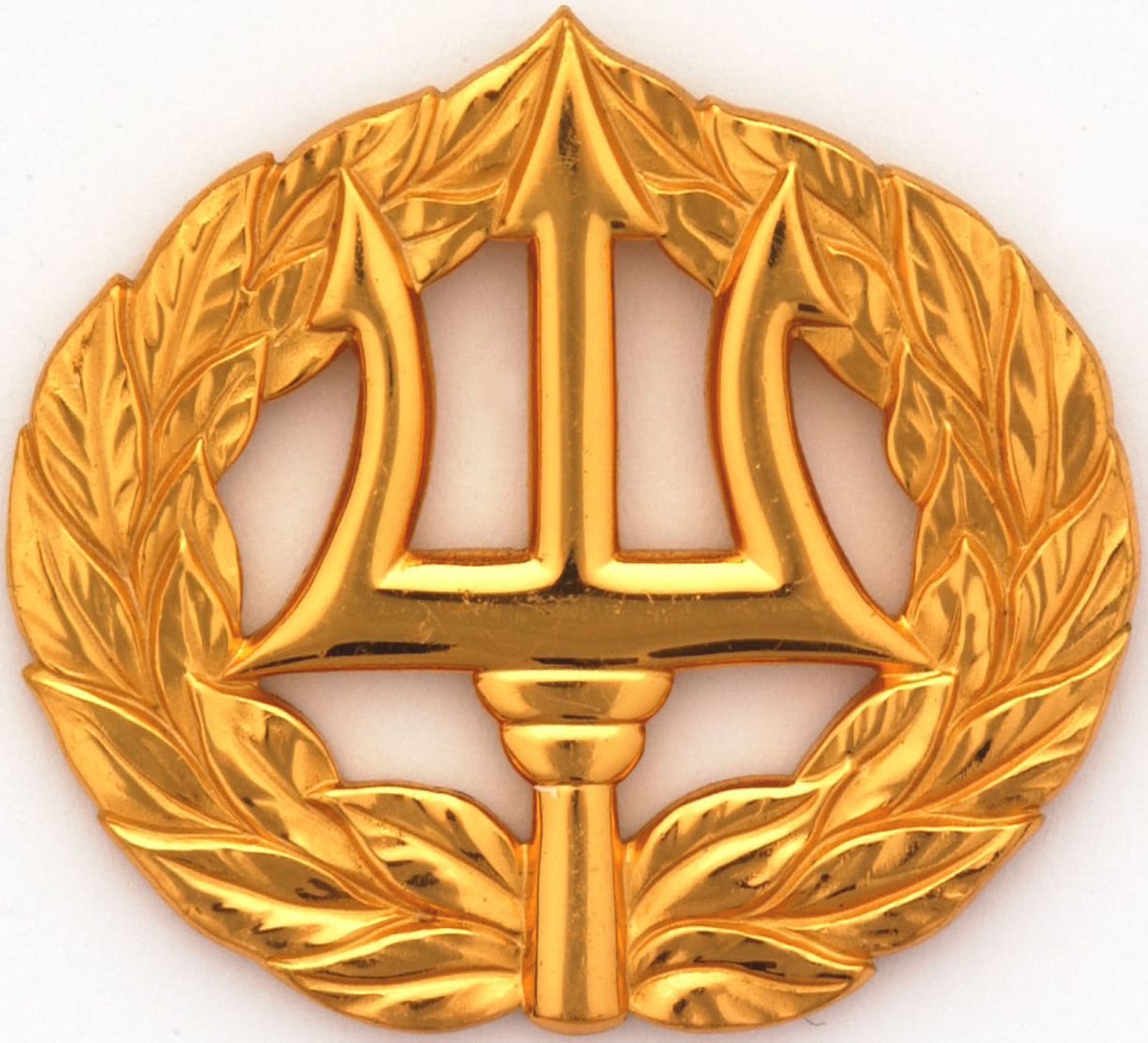

Information Warfare Dominance Officer insignia
Defense Superior Service Medal with two bronze oak leaf clusters
Legion of Merit	Bronze Star Medal with three gold award stars	Defense Meritorious Service Medal with four oak leaf clusters
Meritorious Service Medal with award star	Joint Service Commendation Medal	Navy and Marine Corps Commendation Medal with award star
Joint Service Achievement Medal	Navy and Marine Corps Achievement Medal	Combat Action Ribbon
Navy Presidential Unit Citation	Joint Meritorious Unit Award with four oak leaf clusters	Navy Unit Commendation
Navy Meritorious Unit Commendation with one bronze service star	DIA Director's Award	National Defense Service Medal with service star
Armed Forces Expeditionary Medal	Southwest Asia Service Medal with service star	Kosovo Campaign Medal
Afghanistan Campaign Medal with two service stars	Iraq Campaign Medal with three service stars	Global War on Terrorism Expeditionary Medal
Global War on Terrorism Service Medal	Armed Forces Service Medal	Humanitarian Service Medal with service star
Navy Sea Service Deployment Ribbon with three service stars	Navy and Marine Corps Overseas Service Ribbon with service star	National Defence Medal in gold (France)
NATO Medal for Kosovo	Kuwait Liberation Medal (Kuwait)	Navy Pistol Marksmanship Ribbon
Command Ashore insignia
Joint Chiefs of Staff Badge
Presidential Service Badge

He is also a recipient of the Edwin T. Layton Leadership Award, Vice Admiral Rufus L. Taylor Leadership Award and the Army's Knowlton Award for excellence in intelligence.

== Personal life ==
Whitworth is the son of Frank Dixon Whitworth Jr. and Kay Sutton Whitworth.

Whitworth married Amy Beth Crandall on 5 September 1992 in Alexandria, Virginia. His wife is the younger sister of Navy judge advocate Darse E. Crandall Jr.

Military offices
Preceded by Robert V. Hoppa	Director of Intelligence of the United States Africa Command; 2016–2018	Succeeded by Heidi Berg
Preceded by Steve Parode	Deputy Chief for Tailored Access Operations of the National Security Agency; 2018–2019	Succeeded by Michael Groen
Preceded by Michael Groen	Director of Intelligence of the Joint Staff; 2019–2022	Succeeded by Dimitri Henry
Government offices
Preceded by Robert D. Sharp	Director of the National Geospatial-Intelligence Agency; 2022–2025	Succeeded by Michele Bredenkamp
