= Michael Studeman =

U.S. Navy admiral

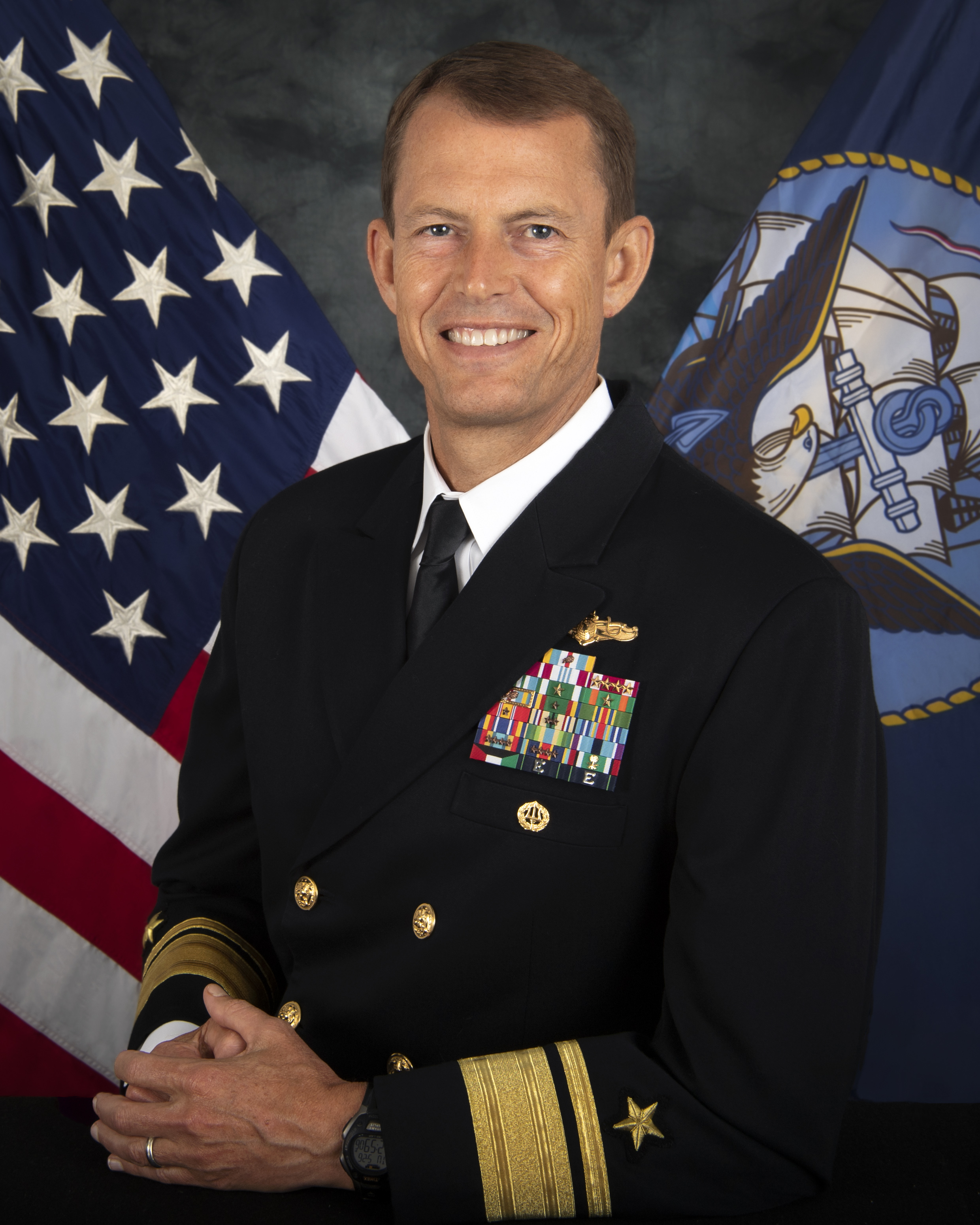
- Born: September 10, 1966 (age 60); Fairfax, Virginia, U.S.
- Relatives: Adm. William O. Studeman (father)
- Military career
- Allegiance: United States
- Branch: United States Navy
- Service years: 1988–2023
- Rank: Rear Admiral
- Commands: National Maritime Intelligence-Integration Office; Office of Naval Intelligence; Joint Intelligence Operations Center; Hopper Information Services Center

Michael William Studeman (born September 10, 1966) is a retired United States Navy rear admiral who last served as director of the National Maritime Intelligence-Integration Office and commander of the Office of Naval Intelligence from August 1, 2022 to July 2023. He most recently served as the Director of Intelligence of the United States Indo-Pacific Command from July 3, 2019 to July 2022, and previously was the Director of Intelligence of the United States Southern Command.

Born in Fairfax, Virginia, Studeman graduated from Langley High School in 1984. He attended the College of William & Mary, earning a B.A. degree in 1988. Studeman later completed an M.A. degree in national security affairs at the Naval Postgraduate School in March 1998. His master's thesis was entitled Dragon in the Shadows: Calculating China's Advances in the South China Sea. Studeman also graduated from the National War College in 2016.

At the Sea, Air, and Space Conference in Washington, DC, April 5, 2023, Studeman explained how the PRC might use supposedly noncombatant vessels such as fishing trawlers to attack both military and civilian shipping and aviation in international waters. These attacks may include ramming of opponents’ vessels and using lasers to blind pilots of opponents’ civilian and military aircraft.

In the September 2024 episode of the "Decoding Geopolitics" podcast, Studeman argued there was a 60% chance of war with China.

Family

He is the son of Navy admiral William O. Studeman and Gloria Diane (Jeans) Studeman. His father served as Director of the National Security Agency from 1988 to 1992 and the Deputy Director of Central Intelligence from 1992 to 1995. On December 28, 1991, Michael Studeman married Brenda Lynne Draper in Middlesex County, Virginia.

Military offices
Preceded by Mary-Kate Leahy	Director of Intelligence of the United States Southern Command; 2017–2019	Succeeded by Timothy D. Brown
Preceded by Jeffrey A. Kruse	Director of Intelligence of the United States Indo-Pacific Command; 2019–2022	Succeeded by Thomas M. Henderschedt
Preceded by Curt Copley	Director of the National Maritime Intelligence-Integration Office and Commander of the Office of Naval Intelligence; 2022–2023	Succeeded by Michael A. Brookes
