= Nimitz Operational Intelligence Center =

ONI center of excellence

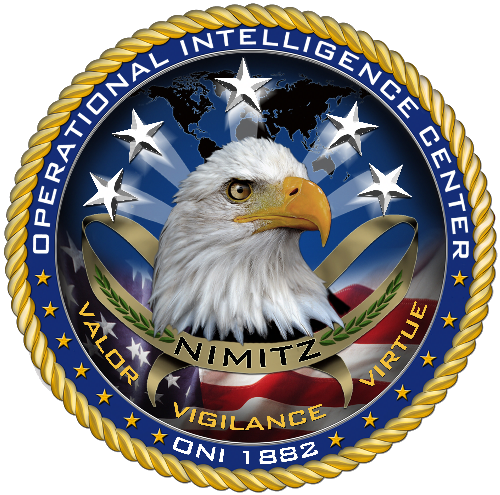

The Nimitz Warfare Analysis Center is one of the four "centers of excellence" under the Office of Naval Intelligence (ONI). The center provides and supports decision makers, policy makers and operational commanders with analysis to meet their requirements. Nimitz is headquartered at National Maritime Intelligence Center which is located in Suitland, Maryland, southeast of Washington, D.C.

== Leadership ==
Nicholas Homan relieved Captain Andrea Pollard from command of the Nimitz Operational Intelligence Center in May 2014. Captain Homan enlisted in the Navy in 1983 as an Aviation Electronics Technician. He graduated from the University of Nebraska with a Bachelor of Science in Mathematics degree. Also, he received his Master of Science in Astronautical Engineering from the Naval Postgraduate School. Captain Homan has had notable deployments and received awards including two Bronze Stars, two Defense Meritorious Service Medals, three Meritorious Service Medals, two Air Medals, Joint Service Commendation Medal, three Navy/Marine Corps Commendation Medals, Joint Service Achievement Medal, Naval/Marine Corps Achievement Medal, Navy/Marine Corps Combat Action Ribbon and various campaign awards.

== Roles and Responsibilities ==
=== Geographically Oriented Cells ===
The Geographically Oriented Cells are teams focused on specific areas of interest and provide extensive knowledge to the Naval forces.

==== Fleet Support Department (FSD) ====
The Fleet Support Department is responsible for term analysis of foreign naval and maritime operations to the fleet, Department of Defense, intelligence agencies, and U.S. law enforcement organizations. FSD integrates mainly with the Geo Oriented Cells of ONI. The 24/7 Watch for the U.S. Navy associates itself closely with FSD and Geo Oriented Cells. The Watch floor maintains situational awareness for naval activity going on in the world.

==== Transnational Threat Department (TNT) ====
The Transnational Threat Department provides ONI with intelligence capabilities based on the achievement of Global Maritime Intelligence Integration (GMII) and Maritime domain awareness. TNT also partners with analysts from the Naval Criminal Investigative Service, Multiple Threat Alert Center (MTAC), and the U.S. Coastguard Intelligence Coordination Center (ICC). They partner with these organizations to provide in-depth analysis on counter illicit weapons proliferation, narcotics smuggling, maritime crime, and piracy.

==== Fleet Imagery Support Team (FIST) ====
The Fleet Imagery Support Team provides exploited imagery obtained from national, theater, tactical and commercial means for fleet focused requests. FIST is essentially the eyes of the US Navy. FIST is composed of highly skilled imagery and GEOINT analysts. The GEOINT analysts have a lot of training with ArcGIS. Joe Kowalczyk is the Deputy Department Head for FIST, and principal advisor to the Program Manager and Commanding Officer, Nimitz Operational Intelligence Center on geospatial-intelligence (GEOINT) support to the fleet and other Nimitz Operational Intelligence Center priority imagery-related requirements.

==== Naval War College (NWC) Detachment (DET) ====
Two years after ONI was created William Chandler established the Naval War College which is responsible for educating naval officers on technology, strategy, tactics, logistics, history, geography, and international law. The Naval War College Detachment provides intelligence support to the college's research, analysis, and war gaming programs.

=== Naval Warfare Department (NWD) ===
NWD provides detailed analysis of naval warfare threats posed by foreign weapons systems and countries of interest. NWD supports operational commanders, mission planners, naval warfare development centers, and the National Intelligence Community with tactical and operational assessments.
