= Admiral Price =

Admiral Price may refer to:

- Gene F. Price (fl. 1980s–2020s), U.S. Navy rear admiral
- John D. Price (1892–1957), U.S. Navy admiral

== See also ==
- Cicero Price (1805–1888), U.S. Navy commodore (admiral equivalent rank)
