= Jeffrey Scheidt =

U.S. Navy admiral

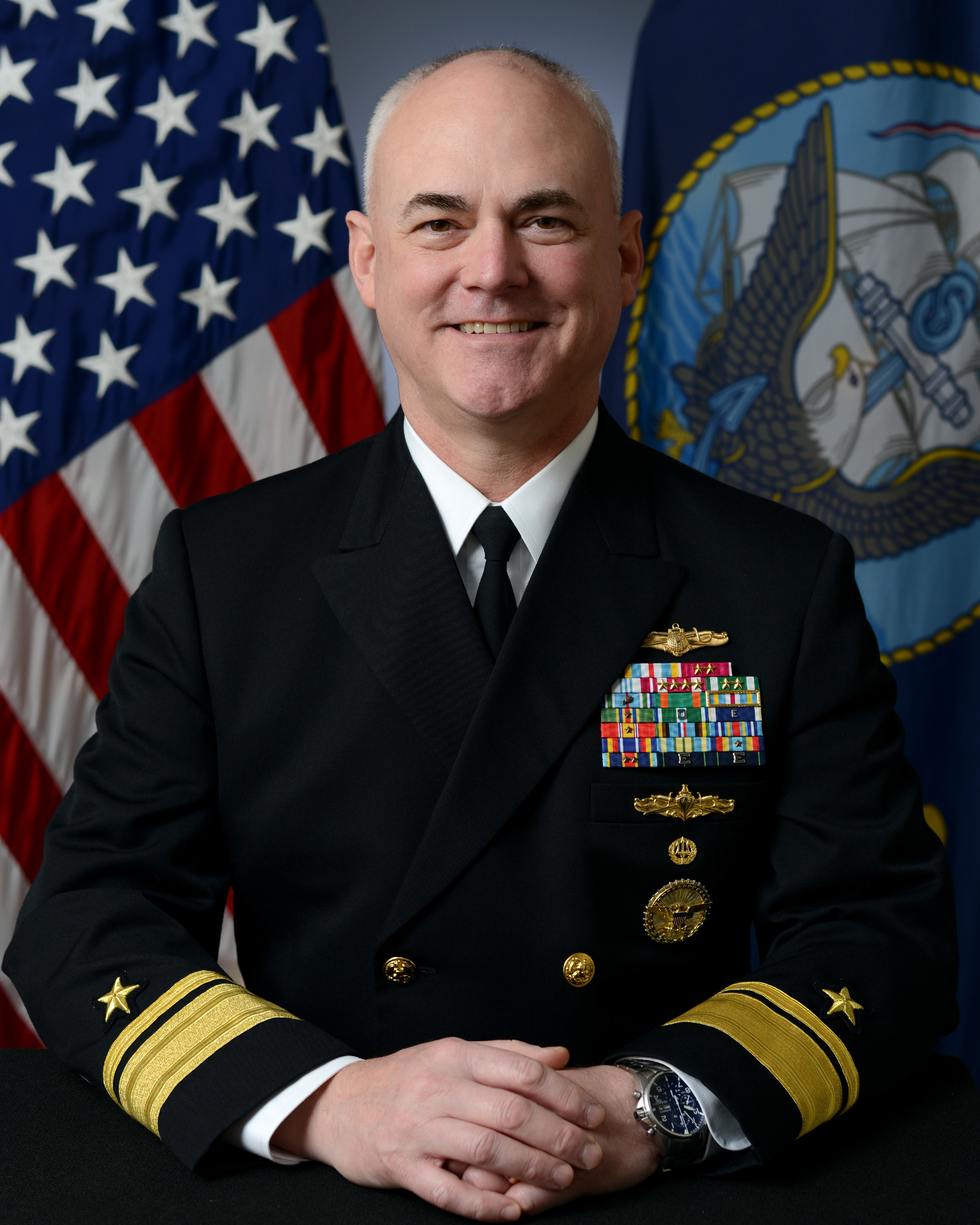
- Military career
- Allegiance: United States
- Branch: United States Navy
- Service years: 1990–2023
- Rank: Rear Admiral
- Commands: Naval Information Warfighting Development Center; Navy Information Operations Command Bahrain; Cryptologic Warfare Group Six; Fleet Cyber Command Task Force 1060; Navy Information Operations Command Bahrain
- Awards: Defense Superior Service Medal; Legion of Merit (2)

Jeffrey S. Scheidt is a retired United States Navy rear admiral who last served as the senior military advisor for cyber policy to the under secretary of defense for policy and deputy principal cyber advisor to the secretary of defense from June 2021 to September 2023.

Military offices
Preceded by John A. Watkins	Commander of the Naval Information Warfighting Development Center; 2018–2020	Succeeded by Michael J. Vernazza
Preceded by Michael Groen	Deputy Chief of Computer Network Operations of the National Security Agency; 2020–2021	Succeeded by ???
Preceded by William Chase III	Senior Military Advisor for Cyber Policy to the Under Secretary of Defense for Policy and Deputy Principal Cyber Advisor to the Secretary of Defense; 2021–2023	Succeeded by Terrence A. Adams
