= Michael A. Brookes =

United States Navy officer (born 1965)

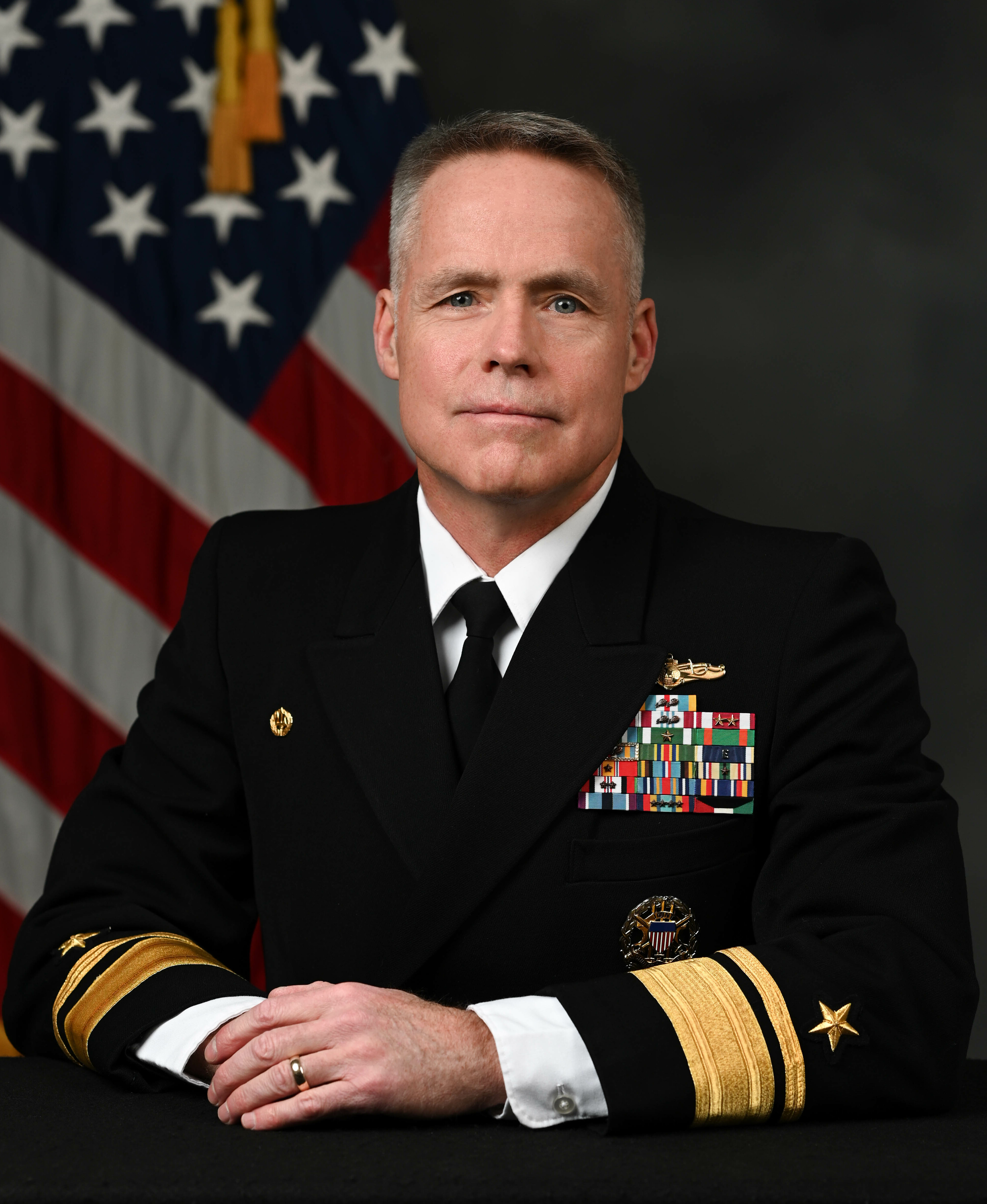
- Official portrait, 2023
- Born: May 27, 1965 (age 61); Albany, New York, U.S.
- Education: California Polytechnic State University (BA); Naval Postgraduate School (MA)
- Military career
- Allegiance: United States
- Branch: United States Navy
- Service years: 1989–present
- Rank: Rear Admiral
- Commands: National Maritime Intelligence-Integration Office; Office of National Intelligence; Joint Intelligence Center Central; Kennedy Irregular Warfare Center
- Awards: Defense Superior Service Medal; Legion of Merit (2); Defense Meritorious Service Medal; Meritorious Service Medal

Michael A. Brookes (born May 27, 1965) is a United States Navy rear admiral who serves as the director of the National Maritime Intelligence-Integration Office and commander of the Office of Naval Intelligence. He previously served as the director of intelligence of the U.S. Southern Command and U.S. Strategic Command.

== Early life and education ==
Brookes is the son of a career naval officer and is a 1987 graduate of California Polytechnic State University, where he received a Bachelor of Arts in Political Science. He also holds a Master of Arts in National Security Affairs from the Naval Postgraduate School in Monterey, California. Brookes attended Navy Officer Candidate School in Newport, Rhode Island and was commissioned in March 1989.

== Military career ==
Brookes’ operational tours include imagery intelligence officer for the "Checkmates" of Fighter Squadron (VF) 211 embarked aboard USS Nimitz (CVN-68); assistant intelligence officer (N21) for Cruiser-Destroyer Group 1, embarked aboard USS Constellation (CV-64); assistant chief of staff for intelligence (N2) for Carrier Strike Group 7, embarked aboard USS Ronald Reagan (CVN-76); deputy director of intelligence (DJ2) for Joint Special Operations Command, where he deployed to Bagram, Afghanistan as director of intelligence (J2) for a joint special operations task force; and information warfare commander for Carrier Strike Group One, embarked aboard USS Carl Vinson (CVN-70).

Ashore, Brookes served as international programs officer for N2 Directorate, U.S. Pacific Fleet; officer-in-charge (OIC), Maritime Watch, Joint Forces Intelligence Command; intelligence operations and plans officer, Naval Special Warfare Command, where he augmented a joint special operations task force in Kabul, Afghanistan; and Deputy Director of Intelligence (DDI), National Joint Operations Intelligence Center (NJOIC) for the Joint Chiefs of Staff.

Brookes commanded the Joint Intelligence Center Central, U.S. Central Command, Tampa, Florida, and Kennedy Irregular Warfare Center, Suitland, Maryland. Prior to his current assignment, Brookes was the deputy commander, U.S. Fleet Cyber Command/U.S. 10th Fleet.

In September 2023, Brookes was nominated for promotion to rear admiral.

Military offices
Preceded by Gene F. Price	Deputy Commander of the United States Tenth Fleet; 2018–2019	Succeeded by Michael Vernazza
Preceded by Kelly Aeschbach	Director of Intelligence of the United States Strategic Command; 2019–2021	Succeeded by Ricky L. Mills
Preceded by Timothy D. Brown	Director of Intelligence of the United States Southern Command; 2021–2023	Succeeded by Dustin A. Shultz
Preceded by Michael W. Studeman	Director of the National Maritime Intelligence-Integration Office and Commander of the Office of Naval Intelligence; 2023–present	Incumbent
