= Brian B. Brown =

United States Navy Vice admiral

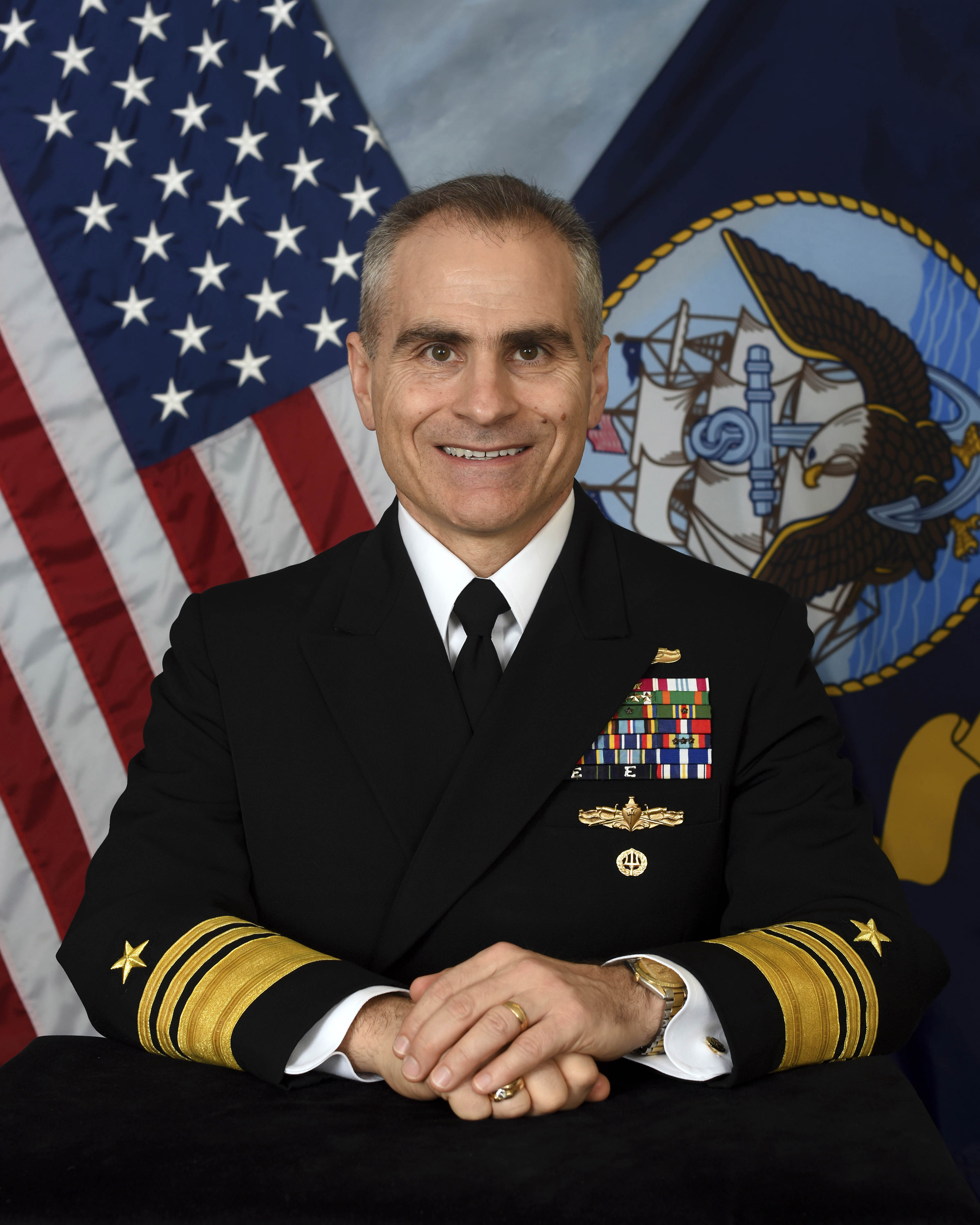
- Vice Admiral Brian B. Brown, May 2018
- Born: Brian Bentley Brown; September 10, 1964 (age 62); Garden Grove, California, U.S.
- Military career
- Allegiance: United States
- Branch: U.S. Navy
- Service years: 1986–2021
- Rank: Vice Admiral
- Other work: U.S. Naval Information Forces (Commander)

Brian Bentley Brown (born September 10, 1964) is a retired United States Navy vice admiral and navigator who last served as commander of the U.S. Naval Information Forces from June 2018 to May 2021. Brian became the second naval officer to assume the NAVIFOR office since it was established. In 1990, he served as a surface warfare officer and was subsequently transferred to the navy's operational arm oceanography command. He was also appointed as the chief of the Navy Space Cadre. As a navigator and administrator, he served aboard aircraft carriers, including USS La Salle and USS Theodore Roosevelt.

As a deputy commander, Brown was assigned to command the Naval Meteorology and Oceanography Command, administration officer of USS Frederick, team officer for third destroyer squadron, and Chief of Naval Operations for Information warfare. He was later promoted from rear admiral to vice admiral before assuming the NAVIFOR office.

== Biography ==
Brian Brown graduated in 1986 from the U.S. Naval Academy with a Bachelor of Science in Oceanography, and then went to the Scripps Institution of Oceanography at the University of California, San Diego where he earned a Master of Science in Oceanography in 1987. Later from the Naval Postgraduate School, he completed an MSc in Meteorology and Physical Oceanography in 1997.

As part of United States Naval Forces Europe, Brown served in Sixth Fleet as oceanographer on the staff of commander for USS La Salle (AGF-3). He was assigned to command the naval oceanographic offices, including Naval Meteorology and Oceanography Command at Jacksonville as well as San Diego. As a placement officer, and assistant oceanography community manager, he was assigned to the Navy Personnel Command and executive assistant to the navigator in the Office of the Chief of Naval Operations.

In June 2014, Brown served as deputy commander of United States Strategic Command for JFCC component Joint Functional Component Command for Space and Global Strike and later in November, he was appointed to the Space Cadre of US Navy.

Brown was relieved as commander of NAVIFOR by Vice Admiral Kelly Aeschbach on May 7, 2021. His retirement ceremony was held on July 1, 2021.

Military offices
Preceded by Jonathan W. White	Commander of the Naval Meteorology and Oceanography Command; 2012–2014	Succeeded by Timothy C. Gallaudet
Preceded by Timothy R. Coffin	Deputy Commander of the Joint Functional Component Command for Space; 2014–2017	Succeeded by Thomas L. James
Preceded by Nancy A. Norton	Director of Warfare Integration of the United States Navy ???–2017	Succeeded by ???
Preceded by Matthew J. Kohler	Commander of Naval Information Forces; 2018–2021	Succeeded by Kelly A. Aeschbach
