= Steve Parode =

Steven L. Parode
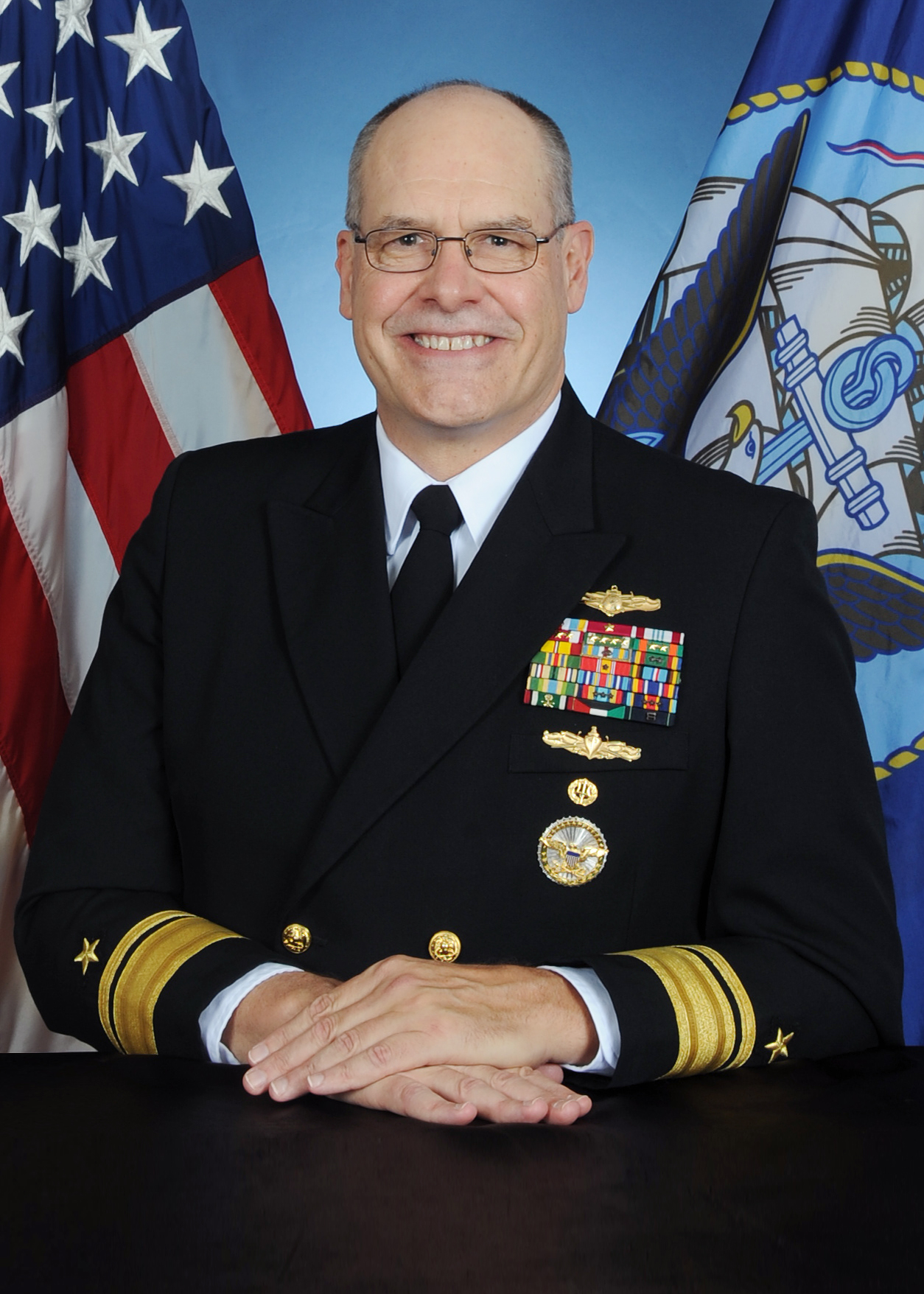
- Born: 1964 (age 61–62); Washington, DC
- Military career
- Allegiance: United States of America
- Branch: United States Navy
- Service years: 1986-2020
- Rank: Rear Admiral
- Awards: Defense Superior Service Medal (two awards), Legion of Merit, Combat Action Ribbon

Steven Lowell Parode (born 1964) is a retired rear admiral in the United States Navy and a seasoned intelligence officer.

== Career ==
Parode's naval career began after receiving a commission via Naval Reserve Officers Training Corps at the University of California, Los Angeles in 1986, includes service during the Gulf War aboard the USS Wisconsin (BB-64) and with the United States Sixth Fleet during the Iraq War. He has also served as Director of Intelligence for United States Strategic Command, as a task force commander with United States Tenth Fleet, and deputy chief of Computer Network Operations (X43) at the National Security Agency.

Rear Admiral Parode is believed to have been last active duty officer in the United States Navy to have served aboard a battleship making him the last battleship admiral.

After retiring from active duty in 2020, Parode transitioned to civilian service as the executive director of the Navy Cyber Warfare Development Group in 2022.

Since November 2023, he has been serving as the Acting Director of Naval Intelligence (DNI) and the Deputy Director of Naval Intelligence (DDNI), along with being the Director of Naval Intelligence Activity (DNIA). His current roles involve overseeing Navy intelligence activities and policies and representing the Navy in the Intelligence Community.

== Education ==
- University of California, Los Angeles - B.A. in History (Soviet Studies), 1986
- Georgetown University – M.A. in National Security Studies (American Government)
- Naval War College – Distinguished Graduate

Military offices
Preceded by ???	Director of Intelligence of the United States Strategic Command; 201?–2016	Succeeded by Curt Copley
Preceded by Curt Copley	Deputy Chief for Tailored Access Operations of the National Security Agency; 2016–2018	Succeeded by Frank D. Whitworth
Preceded by ???	Director of Information Warfare Integration of the United States Navy; 2018–2020	Succeeded by Kathleen Creighton
