= Timothy R. Coffin =

United States Army general

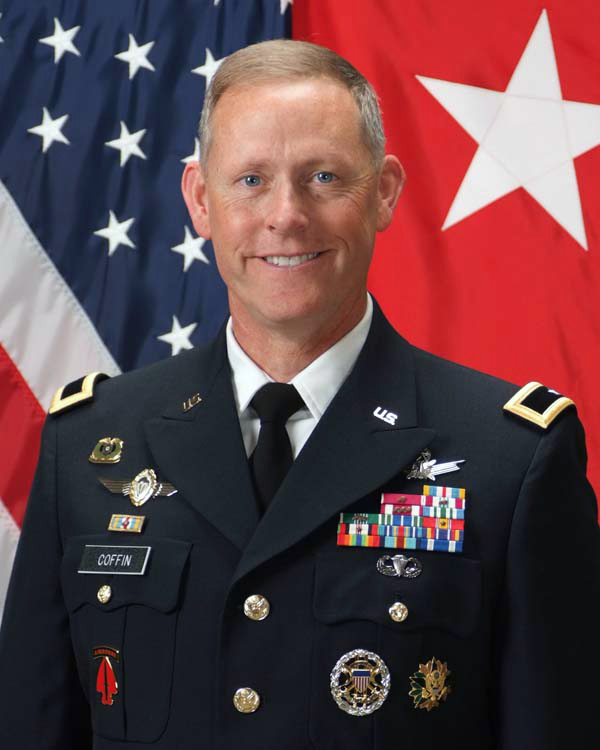
- Military career
- Allegiance: United States
- Branch: United States Army
- Service years: 1981–2017
- Rank: Brigadier general (retired)
- Commands: White Sands Missile Range; 1st Space Brigade; 1st Space Battalion; 62nd Supply and Services Company
- Conflicts: Operation Enduring Freedom
- Awards: Defense Superior Service Medal; Legion of Merit (3); Defense Meritorious Service Medal; Meritorious Service Medal (4)

Timothy R. Coffin is a retired United States Army brigadier general who became the 33rd Commanding General of the White Sands Missile Range on 2 July 2014.

A graduate of Wheaton College, which he attended on an Army Reserve Officer Training Corps scholarship, Coffin was commissioned as an officer in the Quartermaster Corps in December 1981. He was the group supply maintenance officer and logistics plans officer at Army Special Operations Forces Europe from 1982 to 1985. He was watch commander at the United States Space Command and North American Aerospace Defense Command from 1996 to 1999, when he joined the United States Army Space and Missile Defense Command (USASMDC) staff as the G-4 (Logistics Officer) . He subsequently became commander of the 1st Space Battalion. He was deployed to Afghanistan in support of Operation Enduring Freedom as chief of the U.S. Strategic Command Forward Integration Team, Kandahar Air Field, from July 2010 to January 2011, and was Deputy Commanding General for Operations of USASMDC from 2011 to 2014.

== Early life and first post ==
Timothy R. Coffin attended Wheaton College in Wheaton, Illinois, from 1977 to 1981 on a four-year Army Reserve Officer Training Corps scholarship, graduating with a Bachelor of Arts in communications. He was commissioned as an officer in the Quartermaster Corps in December 1981. He completed the Officer Basic Course, and was posted to Bad Toelz, Germany, where he served as the group supply maintenance officer and logistics plans officer at Army Special Operations Forces Europe from 1982 to 1985.

== Biography ==
Returning to the United States in 1985, Coffin completed the Quartermaster Officer Advanced Course, and was posted to Fort Hood, Texas, as the deputy materials officer and S-3 of the Armor Support Battalion. He then assumed his first command, of the 62nd Supply and Services Company, part of the 554th Supply and Services Battalion in the 13th Corps Support Command.

In 1989, Coffin went to Washington, D.C., where he was a recorder for Army promotion and selection boards in the Army Secretariat. He was then assigned to the Joint Staff, working as an intern in J-4 for General Colin Powell. He attended the Command and General Staff College at Fort Leavenworth, Kansas, from 1992 to 1993, and then the School of Advanced Military Studies from 1993 to 1994. He became a division planner with 4th Infantry Division at Fort Carson, Colorado, and then executive officer of the 64th Forward Support Battalion until 1996.

Coffin then became an intelligence watch commander at the United States Space Command and North American Aerospace Defense Command. In 1999, he joined the United States Army Space and Missile Defense Command (USASMDC) staff as the G-4 (Logistics Officer) and subsequently became commander of the 1st Space Battalion. In 2001, he joined the Army staff as a space and aviation system integrator. He attended the Army War College from 2001 to 2002, receiving a Master of Science (M.S.) degree in Military Security Policy and Strategy, and became Chief of the Space and Missile Defense Division on the Army Staff.

Coffin was the Director for Combat Developments in the USASMDC's Future Warfare Center until 2006, when he assumed command of the 1st Space Brigade. From July 2008 to February 2011, he was J3 and J7 of the Joint Functional Component Command for Space (JFCC SPACE). He deployed to Kabul, Afghanistan, in 2010 in support of Operation Enduring Freedom as chief of the U.S. Strategic Command Forward Integration Team, Kandahar Air Field, from July 2010 to January 2011.

From June 2011 to December 2012, Coffin was Deputy Commanding General for Operations of USASMDC. He was promoted to the rank of brigadier general in a ceremony at USASMDC Operations headquarters at Peterson Air Force Base, Colorado, on 6 June 2012, with Lieutenant General Richard P. Formica administering the Oath of Office. While his father Bernie looked on, his wife Kristy and daughter April pinned on his stars. He was Deputy Commander of JFCC SPACE until 2 July 2014, when he became the 33rd Commanding General of the White Sands Missile Range. This was Tim's last assignment as he was retired in 2017.

== Awards ==
Coffin's awards and decorations include the Defense Superior Service Medal, the Legion of Merit with two oak leaf clusters, the Defense Meritorious Service Medal and the Meritorious Service Medal with three oak leaf clusters. He has earned the Joint Staff Identification Badge, Army Staff Identification Badge, Master Space Badge, and both the United States and German Parachutist Badges. In November 2013 he was selected as a fellow of the American Institute of Aeronautics and Astronautics.

== Works ==
- Coffin, Major Timothy R. (1994). How Big Is the Canvas for Operational Art? (PDF). Fort Leavenworth, Kansas: School of Advanced Military Studies. Archived (PDF) from the original on 24 September 2015.

== Notes ==
Military offices
| Preceded by Cary C. Chun | Deputy Commander of the Joint Functional Component Command for Space; 2013–2014 | Succeeded by Brian B. Brown |
