= Michael Vernazza =

U.S. Navy admiral

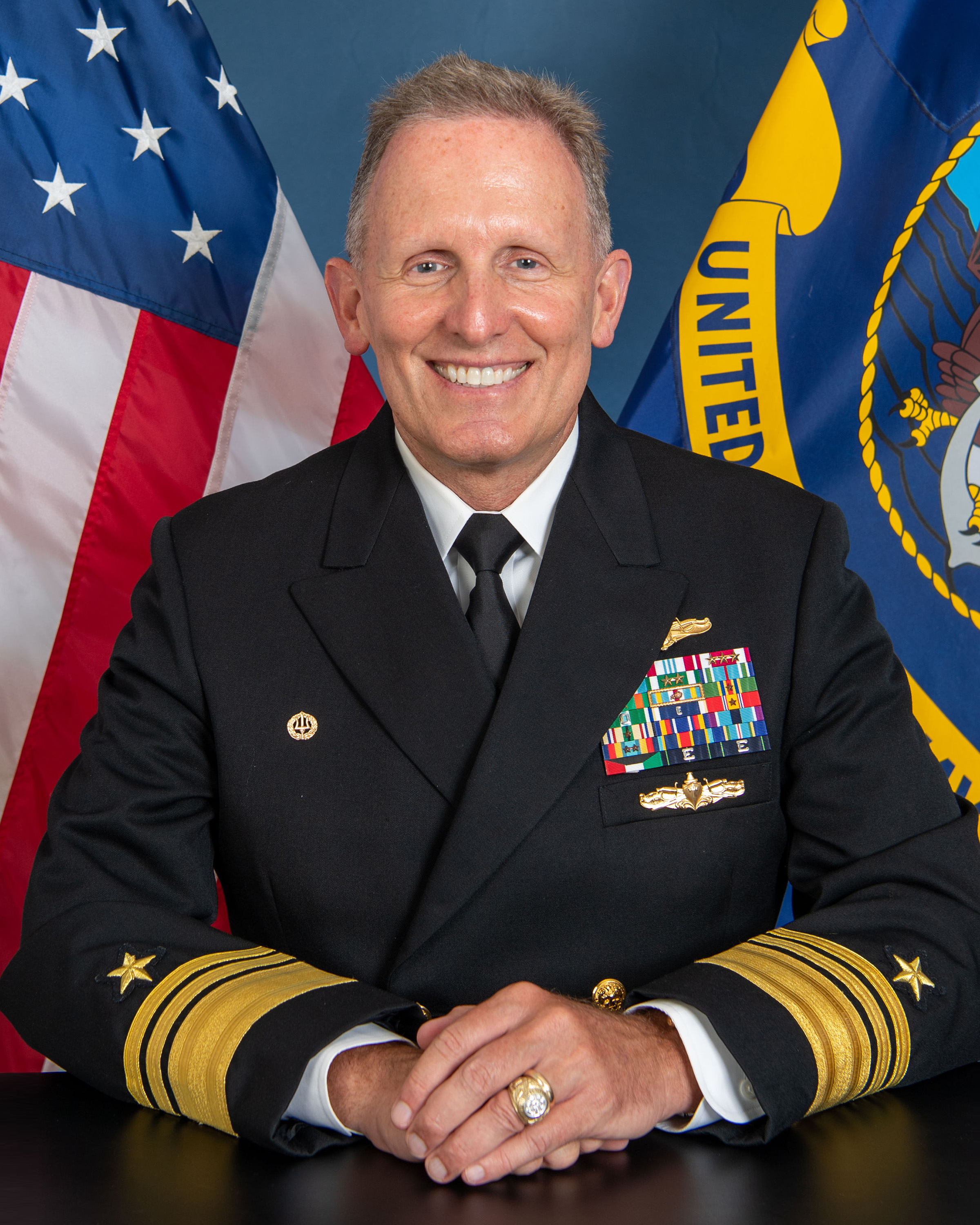
- Official portrait, 2024
- Born: c. 1968 (age 57–58)
- Military career
- Allegiance: United States
- Branch: United States Navy
- Service years: 1990–present
- Rank: Vice Admiral
- Commands: Naval Information Forces; Fleet Information Warfare Command Pacific; Naval Information Warfighting Development Center; Navy Information Operations Command Georgia
- Awards: Legion of Merit

Michael J. Vernazza (born c. 1968) is a United States Navy vice admiral who serves as the commander of Naval Information Forces. He most recently served as the commander of the Fleet Information Warfare Command Pacific. He previously served as the commander of the Naval Information Warfighting Development Center.

In May 2024, Vernazza was nominated for promotion to vice admiral and assignment as commander of the Naval Information Forces.

Military offices
Preceded by James H. Mills	Chief of Staff of the U.S. Fleet Cyber Command and United States Tenth Fleet; 2018–2019	Succeeded by John A. Watkins
Preceded by Michael A. Brookes	Deputy Commander of the United States Tenth Fleet; 2019–2020	Succeeded by John A. Watkins
Preceded by Jeffrey Scheidt	Commander of the Naval Information Warfighting Development Center; 2020–2022	Succeeded by Bryan E. Braswell
New command	Commander of the Fleet Information Warfare Command Pacific; 2022–2024	Succeeded by Nicholas M. Homan
Preceded by Kelly Aeschbach	Commander of Naval Information Forces; 2024–present	Incumbent
