= John A. Watkins (admiral) =

U.S. Navy admiral

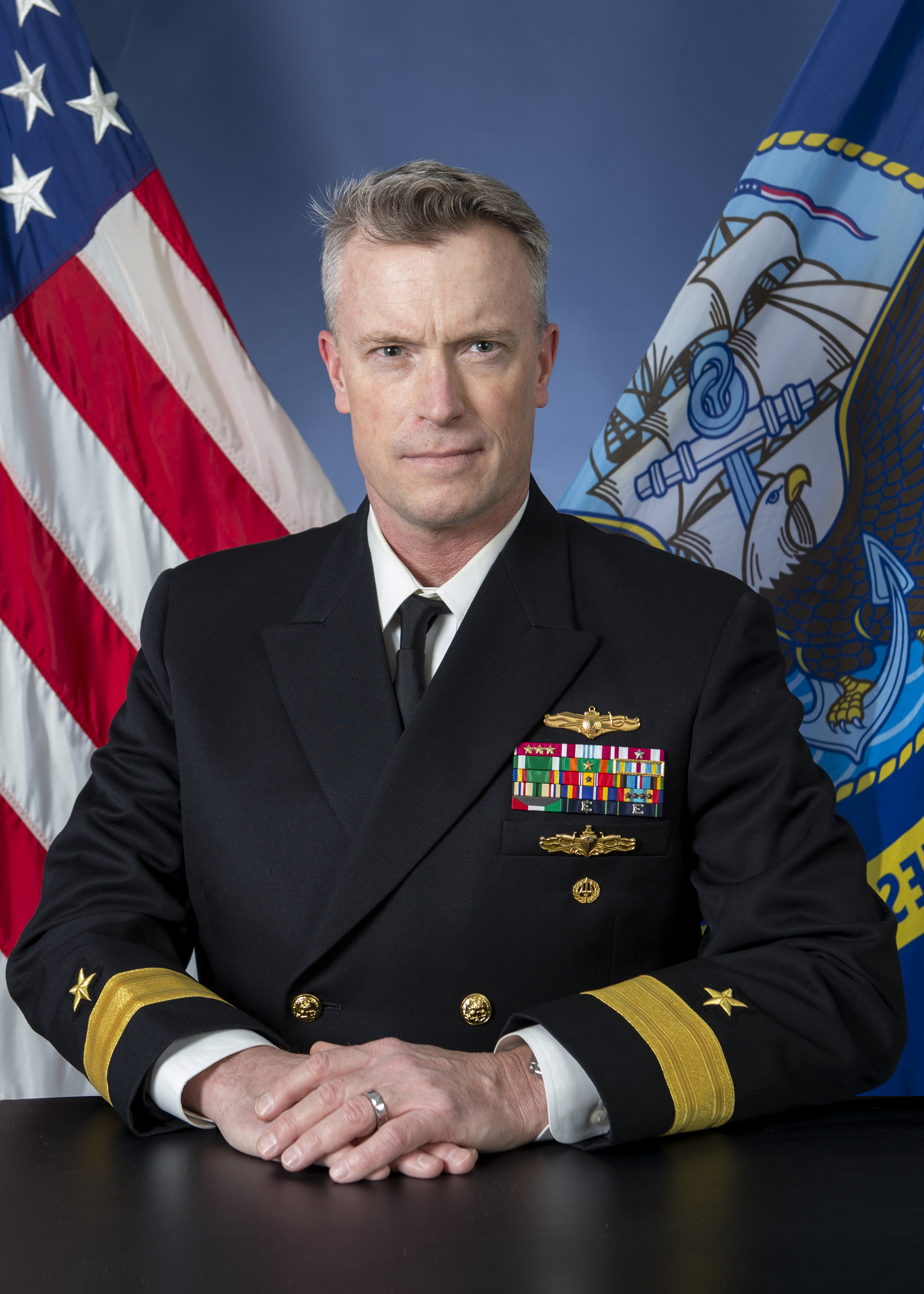
- Born: San Francisco, California, U.S.
- Military career
- Allegiance: United States
- Branch: United States Navy
- Service years: 1990–present
- Rank: Rear Admiral (lower half)
- Commands: Naval Information Warfare Development Center

John A. Watkins is a United States Navy rear admiral (lower half) who currently serves as the deputy director of command, control, communications and computer systems and information technology of the United States Space Command since June 11, 2021. He previously served as the Deputy Commander of the United States Tenth Fleet and, prior to that, the Chief of Staff of the U.S. Fleet Cyber Command and United States Tenth Fleet.

Military offices
New office	Commander of the Naval Information Warfare Development Center; 2017–2019	Succeeded by Jeffrey Scheidt
Preceded by Michael J. Vernazza	Chief of Staff of the U.S. Fleet Cyber Command and United States Tenth Fleet; 2019–2020	Succeeded by Matthew H. Welsh
Preceded by Michael J. Vernazza	Deputy Commander of the United States Tenth Fleet; 2020–2021	Succeeded by Will Pennington
New office	Deputy Director of Command, Control, Communications, and Computer Systems and Information Technology of the United States Space Command; 2021–present	Incumbent
