= U.S. Naval Information Forces =

Echelon III command of the U.S. Navy

Naval Information Forces Command
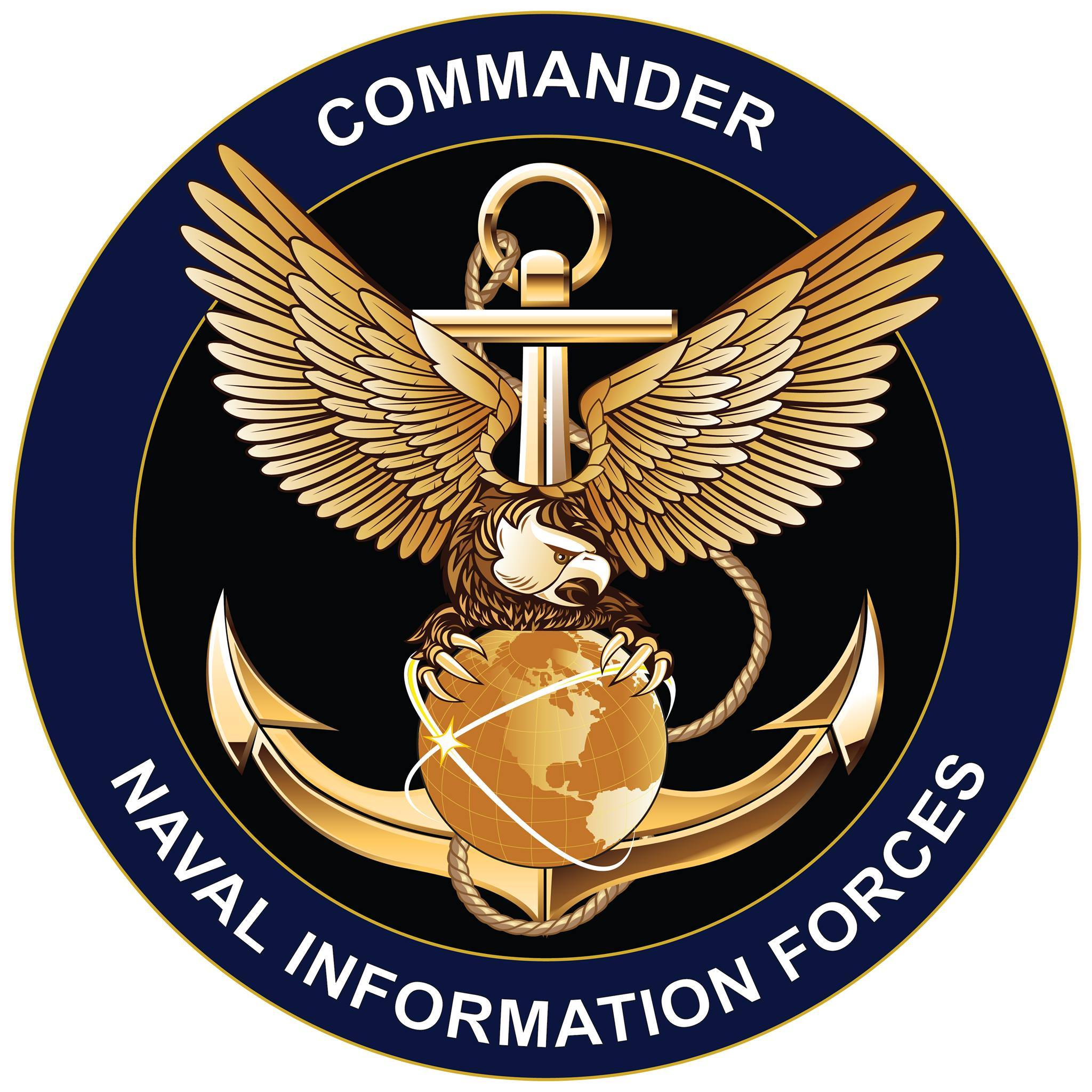
- Active: October 1, 2014-current
- Country: United States of America
- Branch: United States Navy
- Type: Type Command
- Garrison/HQ: Suffolk, Virginia

Commanders
- Current commander: VADM Michael Vernazza

The Naval Information Forces (NAVIFOR) is an Echelon III command under US Fleet Forces Command (USFLTFORCOM). It is the Type Command (TYCOM) for meteorology and oceanography, cryptology/SIGINT, cyber, electronic warfare, information operations, intelligence, networks, and space disciplines. Like other TYCOMs, this is the manpower, training, modernization, and maintenance component for these disciplines. NAVIFOR's mission is to support operational commanders ashore and afloat by providing combat-ready information warfare forces, which are forward deployable, fully trained, properly crewed, capably equipped, always ready, well maintained and combat sustainable.

On 9 February 2016, the command was renamed from Navy Information Dominance Forces (NAVIDFOR) to Naval Information Forces as part of the alignment of the Information Dominance Corps under its new name, the Information Warfare Community.

== List of commanders ==
No.	Commander		Term		
No.	Portrait	Name	Took office	Left office	Term length
Commander, Navy Information Dominance Forces (COMNAVIDFOR)
1	Diane E.H. Webber	Rear Admiral (lower half); Diane E.H. Webber	October 1, 2014	October 3, 2014	2 days
2	Matthew J. Kohler	Rear Admiral; Matthew J. Kohler	October 3, 2014	February 9, 2016	1 year, 129 days
Commander, Naval Information Forces (COMNAVIFOR)
2	Matthew J. Kohler	Vice Admiral; Matthew J. Kohler	February 9, 2016	June 15, 2018	2 years, 126 days
3	Brian B. Brown	Vice Admiral; Brian B. Brown	June 15, 2018	May 7, 2021	2 years, 326 days
4	Kelly A. Aeschbach	Vice Admiral; Kelly A. Aeschbach	May 7, 2021	July 26, 2024	3 years, 80 days
5	Michael J. Vernazza	Vice Admiral; Michael J. Vernazza	July 26, 2024	Incumbent	1 year, 339 days

== See also ==
- Fleet Cyber Command/Tenth Fleet
- U.S. Cyber Command
- U.S. Navy Cyber Forces – former type command, established in January 2010 and absorbed into NAVIFOR on 1 October 2014
- Information Warfare Community (formerly Information Dominance Corps) – advisory corps of the United States Navy
- Navy Information Operations Command, Hawaii – administrative subordinate command of NAVIFOR
- Naval Security Group – formerly tasked with intelligence gathering and denial of intelligence to adversaries
