= U.S. Navy Cyber Forces =

Former type command of the United States Navy (2010-2014)

United States Navy Cyber Forces
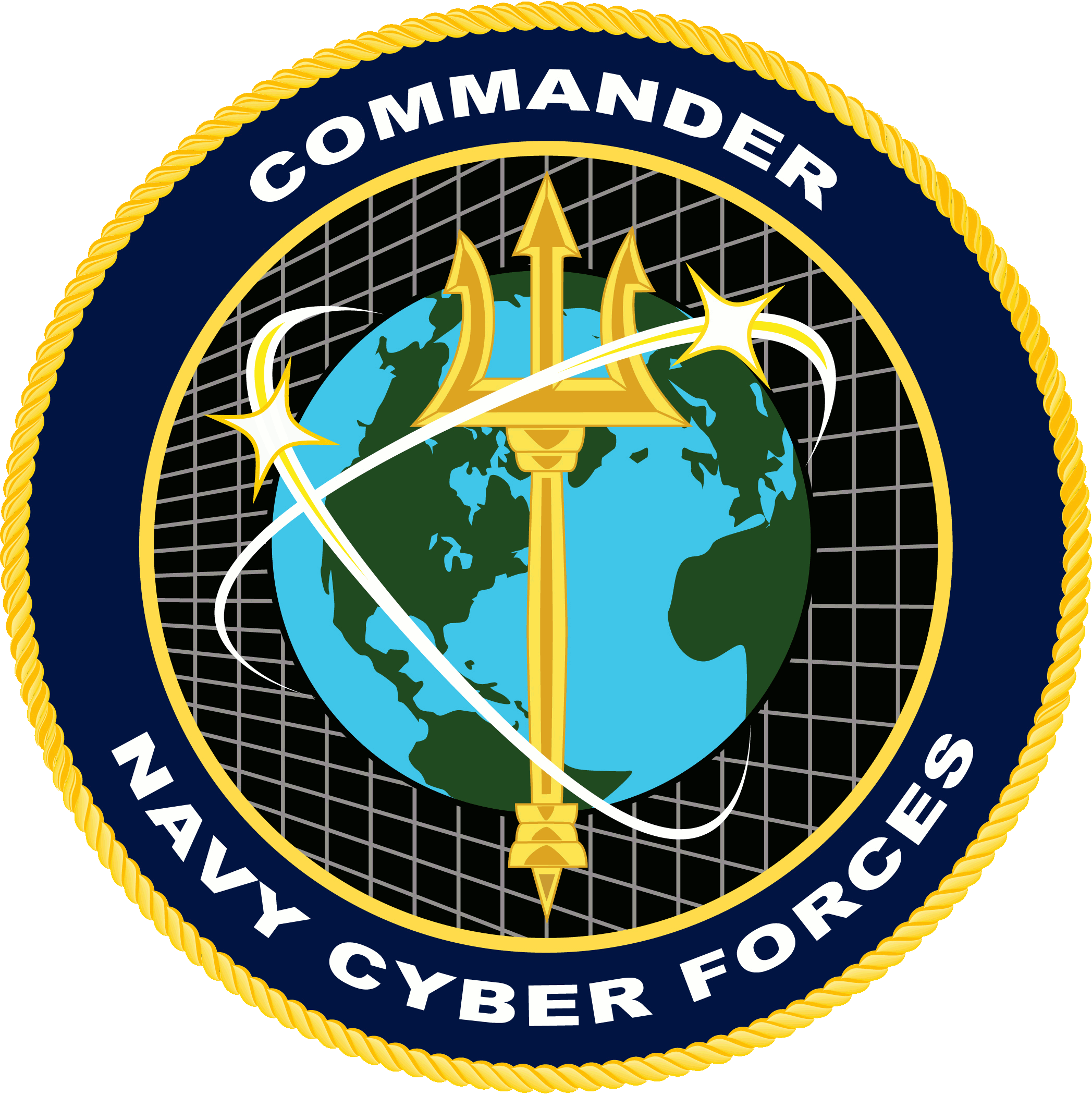
- U.S. Navy Cyber Forces emblem
- Active: January 26, 2010 – October 1, 2014
- Country: United States of America
- Branch: United States Navy
- Type: Type Command
- Garrison/HQ: Little Creek-Fort Story

The Navy Cyber Forces (CYBERFOR) was the Type Command (TYCOM) for the U.S. Navy's global cyber workforce. The headquarters was located at 115 Lake View Parkway in Suffolk, Virginia. CYBERFOR provided forces and equipment in cryptology/signals intelligence, cyber, electronic warfare, information operations, intelligence, networks, and space. Navy Cyber Forces was an operational component of the U.S. Navy Information Dominance Corps. CYBERFOR has been absorbed into the Naval Information Forces command.

== Mission ==
Its mission is to organize and prioritize, training, modernization, and maintenance, requirements, and capabilities of command and control architecture/networks, cryptologic and space-related systems and intelligence and information operations activities, and to coordinate with Type Commanders, to deliver interoperable, relevant and ready forces at the right time at the best cost, today and in the future.

== Organization ==
CYBERFOR was the U.S. Navy C5I Type Commander responsible to man, train and equip all C5I forces afloat and ashore. They reported to Fleet Forces Command.

=== Reporting Commands ===
- Navy and Marine Corps Spectrum Center
- Navy Communications Security Material System Command
- Fleet Intelligence Adaptive Force (FIAFs)
- Fleet Intelligence Detachments (FIDs)

== See also ==
- U.S. Navy Information Forces (formerly the Navy Information Dominance Forces or NAVIDFOR)
- Information Warfare Community (formerly the Information Dominance Corps)
- Fleet Cyber Command/Tenth Fleet
- United States Cyber Command
