= Information Warfare Specialist =

United States Navy badge

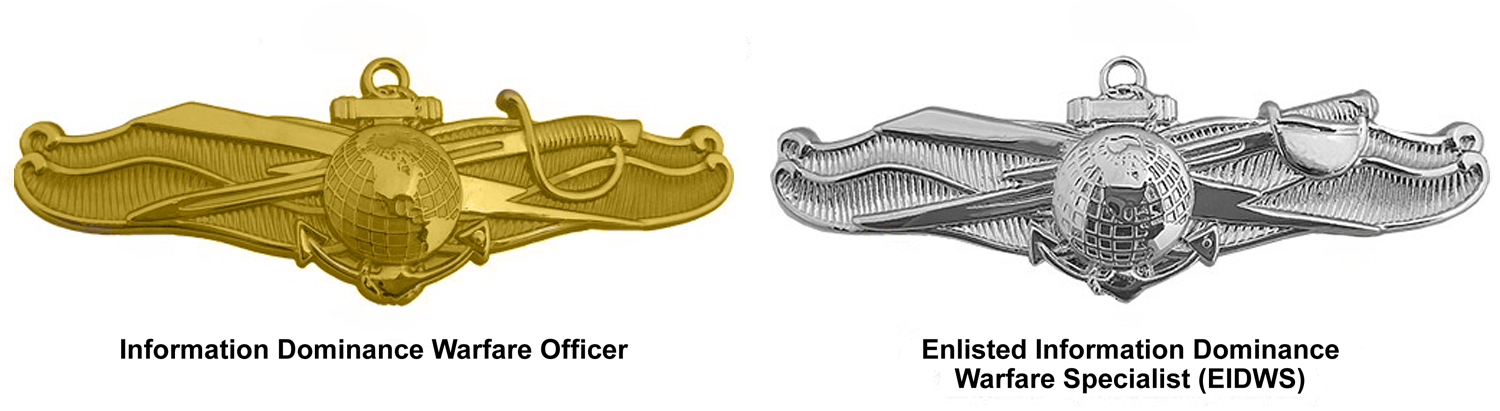
The EIWS badge, Officer (gold) & Enlisted (silver) variants

The Enlisted Information Warfare Specialist Insignia (EIWS) is a military badge of the United States Navy which was created in 2010. The insignia recognizes those members of the Navy's enlisted force who have acquired the specific professional skills, knowledge, and military experience that result in qualification for service in the information warfare activities of the Navy.

== Formation of role ==
The EIWS warfare designation program (formerly Enlisted Information Dominance Warfare Specialist [EIDWS]) was implemented in 2010 to qualify Information Warfare Corps (IWC) personnel in the aerographer's mate (AG), cryptologic technician (CT), intelligence specialist (IS), information systems technician (IT), cyber warfare technician (CWT) ratings. Attainment of EIWS designation signifies that an eligible Sailor has achieved a level of excellence and proficiency in Information Warfare (IW). Additionally, the EIWS insignia means the Sailor is competent in his or her rating and has acquired additional general knowledge to enhance his or her understanding of the role of the Information Warfare Corps (IWC) as it pertains to warfighting, mission effectiveness, and command survivability. Sailors can earn EIWS qualification only through a formal qualification program.

== Prerequisite for EIWS ==
The basic prerequisite for the Enlisted Information Warfare Specialist insignia is that a service member be assigned to a command under administrative command of the NAVIDFOR. In addition to all commands under Administrative Control (ADCON) to NAVIDFOR after Oct 1, 2014, the following commands are authorized to manage an EIDWS program:

- Fleet Cyber Command (FCC)
- Naval Strike and Air Warfare Command (NSAWC)
- Naval Network Warfare Command (NAVNETWARCOM)
- Office of Naval Intelligence (ONI)
- Naval Meteorology and Oceanography Command (NAVMETOCCOM)
- Navy Information Dominance Corps Reserve Command (IDCRC)
- Numbered Fleet Maritime Operations Centers (MOC)
- Unified Combatant Command (COCOM) Joint Intelligence Operations Centers (JIOC)
- Defense Intelligence Agency (DIA)
- Defense Information System Agency (DISA)
- Space and Naval Warfare Systems Command (SPAWAR)
- Naval Special Warfare Development Group (NSWDG)
- Special Reconnaissance TEAM 1 and TEAM 2 (SPECRECON TEAM 1/ 2)
- Navy Expeditionary Intelligence Command (NEIC)
- Center for Information Dominance Units; Corry Station, Monterey, Hampton Roads and San Diego
- Ships of CVN, LHD, LCC, LPD or LHA designation
- Explosive Ordnance Disposal Mobile Units 1 and 2

== Qualification process ==
The qualification process to obtain the insignia begins with the Enlisted Information Personal Qualification Standards, also known as PQS. There are three PQS for the Enlisted Information Warfare Specialist insignia. The first is the Common Core which consists of concepts, policies, and tasks that are common throughout information warfare and provide a foundation for the sailor's knowledge. The second is a platform-specific PQS which consists of both classified and unclassified information outlining the intelligence community and how the prescribed platform conducts its mission within the community. The third book comprises classified command-specific material encompassing the full mission of each command that administers the program. The entire PQS normally takes approximately one year to complete from the point of enrolling in the program. First-term sailors will have 30 months to complete the qualification. E-5 and above initial qualifiers will have 18 months and all re-qualifications will have 12 months.

Those completing the Enlisted PQS must then pass a written examination and a review board conducted by senior enlisted personnel, normally the rate of Chief Petty Officer or above. Upon passing both the examination and the oral board, the Enlisted Information Warfare Specialist insignia may be presented.

An enlisted person who has qualified for his or her EIWS pin places the designator IW after his or her rate and rating; for example, Information Systems Technician First Class Omelia, having qualified for his EIWS pin, is identified as IT1(IW) Omelia. If attached to a command within the information warfare community, IW will be the primary designator. For example, CTR2(IW/SW) Parker.

Upon transfer to the sailor's next command, he or she is required to complete an abbreviated re-qualification process to familiarize the sailor with the differences between various platforms. This process must be completed within 12 months of reporting aboard or the sailor loses the right to wear the EIWS insignia and may receive punitive measures such as an SP evaluation.

The Enlisted Information Warfare Specialist insignia is not required for continued advancement in the Navy, however for those in information warfare ratings the insignia must be obtained by three years as a Petty Officer Second Class. Those failing to obtain the insignia may be ineligible for advancement to Petty Officer First Class, or reenlistment in their current rating.

The Enlisted Information Warfare Specialist insignia is the primary insignia of the enlisted Information Warfare Community, though members outside the community may qualify if assigned to a command with an EIWS program (YN, CS, LS, LN, MA, Seabees). In 2014, NAVIDFOR substantially revised previous instruction COMNAVCYBERFORINST 1414.1B to align requirements and the number of commands authorized to run their own EIWS program.

== See also ==
- List of United States Navy enlisted warfare designations
- Badges of the United States Navy
- Uniforms of the United States Navy
