= Information Warfare Community =

U.S. Navy advisory corps supporting Navy, Joint and national warfighting requirements

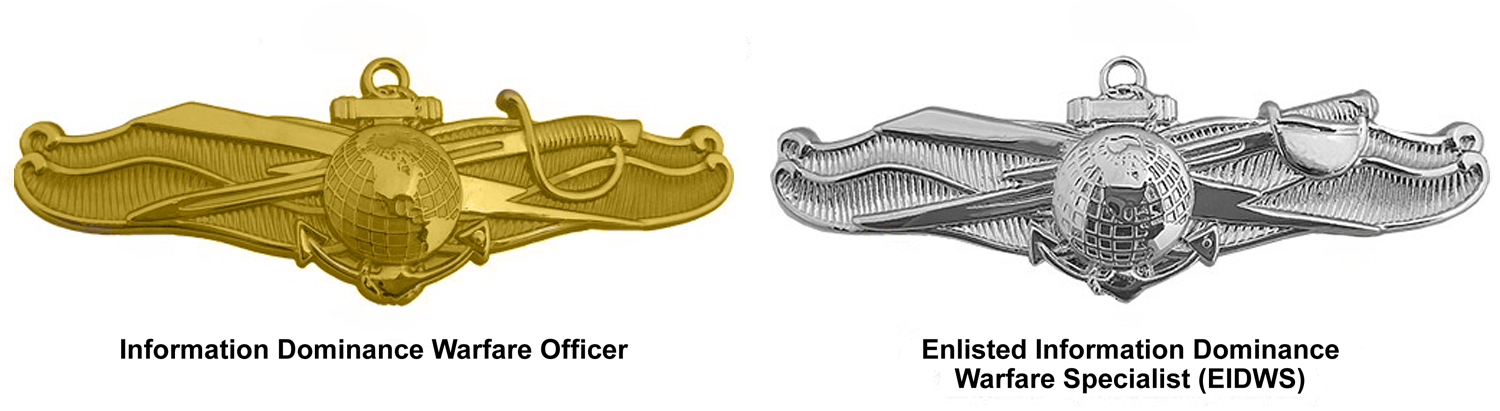
Navy Information Warfare Insignias

The U.S. Navy Information Warfare Community (IWC) leads and manages a cadre of officers, enlisted, and civilian professionals who possess extensive skills in information-intensive fields. This corps works in information, intelligence, counterintelligence, human-derived information, networks, space, and oceanographic disciplines to support U.S. Navy, Joint and national war fighting requirements. The IWC is part of a U.S. Navy initiative to merge intelligence with command, control, communications, and computers.

== Mission ==
Gain a deep understanding of the inner workings of United States adversaries, develop unmatched knowledge of the battlespace, provide naval operating forces with sufficient over-match in wartime command and control, and project power through and across the network.

== Background ==
The Information Warfare Community, originally known as the Information Dominance Corps, was created within the U.S. Navy in 2009 to more effectively and collaboratively lead and manage officers, enlisted, and civilian professionals who possess extensive skills in information-intensive related fields. This corps of professionals works, trains and is educated in information, intelligence, counterintelligence, human-derived information, cyber, space, and oceanographic disciplines. It is tasked with developing and delivering dominant information capabilities in support of U.S. Navy, Joint and national warfighting requirements.

== Community management ==
The Deputy Chief of Naval Operations for Information Dominance/Director of Naval Intelligence (OPNAV N2/N6) was designated as the leader of the IWC in 2009, representing a transition in the evolution of naval warfare, designed to elevate information as a main battery of Naval warfighting capabilities and establish Naval prominence in intelligence, cyber warfare, and information management.

== Operational components ==
CNO N2/N6 exercises administrative control of Fleet Cyber Command/Tenth Fleet.

=== Fleet Cyber Command/Tenth Fleet ===
Fleet Cyber Command is an operating force of the United States Navy responsible for the Navy's cyber warfare programs. Tenth Fleet is a force provider for Fleet Cyber Command.

=== Naval Information Forces ===
Naval Information Forces, formerly Naval Information Dominance Forces, is the Type Commander (TYCOM) for cryptology/SIGINT, cyber, electronic warfare, information operations, intelligence, networks, and space disciplines.

== Community ==
The IWC is made up of Information Professional Officers (IP), Cryptologic Warfare (CW) officers, Intelligence Officers (INTEL), Cyber Warfare Engineers, Cyber Warfare Technicians (formerly Cryptologic Technician-Networks), Oceanography Officers (METOC), Maritime Space Officers (MSO), Space Cadre, Aerographers Mates (AG), Cryptologic Technicians (CT), Intelligence Specialists (IS), Information Technicians (IT) and Navy civilians.

== See also ==
- U.S. Naval Information Forces (formerly the Navy Information Dominance Forces or NAVIDFOR)
- U.S. Navy Cyber Forces
- Fleet Cyber Command/Tenth Fleet
- U.S. Cyber Command
- Information Operations (United States)
