= Office of Naval Intelligence =

United States Navy agency

Office of Naval Intelligence (ONI)
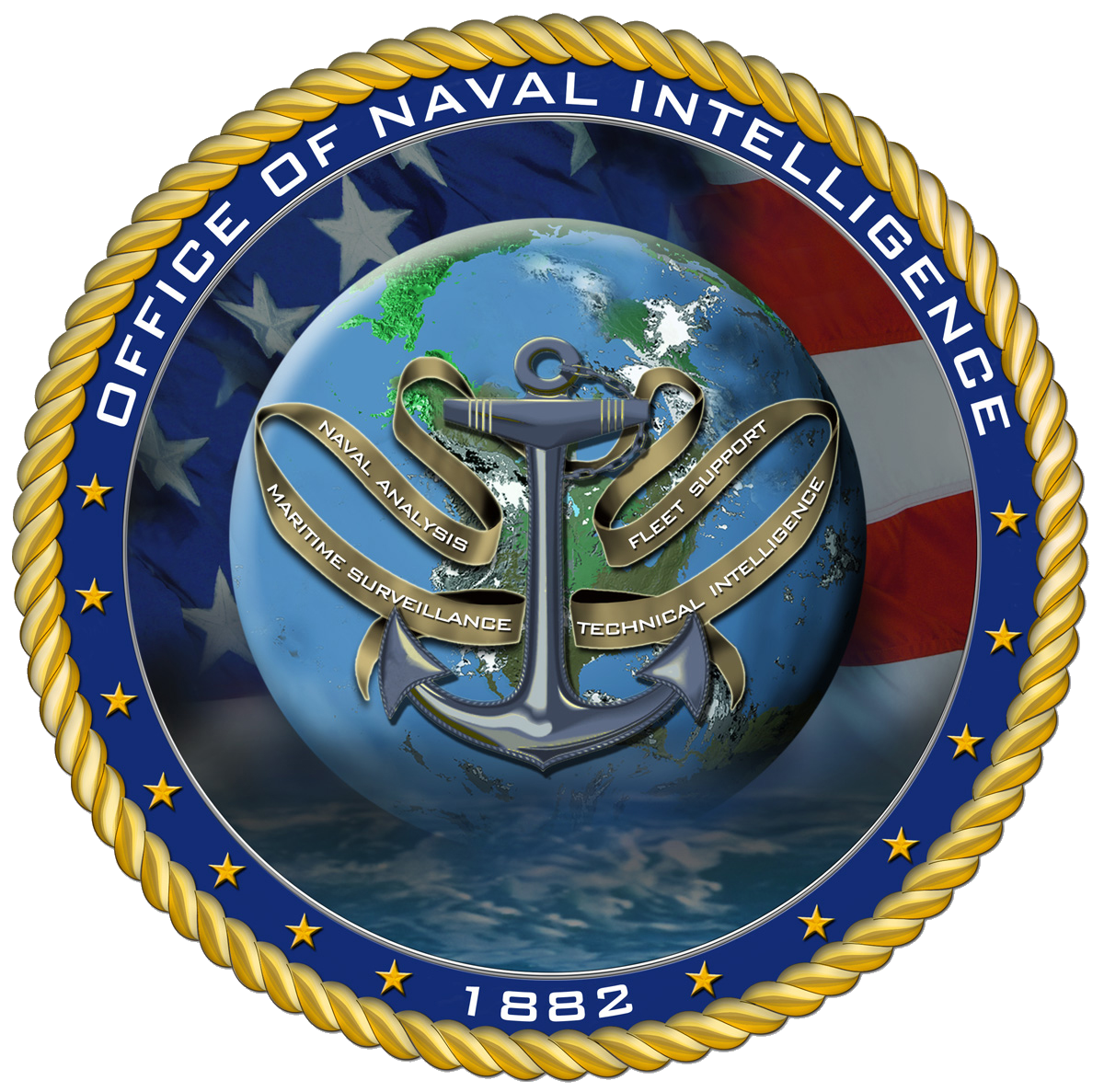
- Seal of the Office of Naval Intelligence

Agency overview
- Formed: March 23, 1882; 144 years ago
- Headquarters: National Maritime Intelligence Center, Suitland, Maryland
- Employees: ≈3,000 (civilian and military)
- Annual budget: Classified
- Agency executives: RADM Michael A. Brookes, Commander; Scott V. Chesbrough (acting), Deputy Commander
- Parent agency: United States Navy
- Website: oni.navy.mil

The Office of Naval Intelligence (ONI) is the military intelligence agency of the United States Navy. Established in 1882 primarily to advance the Navy's modernization efforts, it is the oldest member of the U.S. Intelligence Community and serves as the Federal Government's premier source of maritime intelligence.

Since the First World War, ONI's mission has broadened to include real-time reporting on the developments and activities of foreign navies; protecting maritime resources and interests; monitoring and countering transnational maritime threats; providing technical, operational, and tactical support to the U.S. Navy and its partners; and surveying the global maritime environment. ONI employs over 3,000 military and civilian personnel worldwide and is headquartered at the National Maritime Intelligence Center in Suitland, Maryland.

== History ==
Despite playing an active and decisive role in the American Civil War, in the following years the U.S. Navy fell into precipitous decline. A lack of both federal funding and public interest reduced the Navy's size, prestige, and technological superiority; whereas steel ships were increasingly the norm, the U.S. Navy was entirely wooden. Towards the end of the 19th century, American naval power had become vastly obsolete compared to Europe, and even lagged behind the navies of less developed nations such as Chile.

In an era of rapid industrialization, globalized commerce, and colonial expansion, Alfred Thayer Mahan's ideas about the importance of sea power, expressed in his book The Influence of Sea Power upon History were adopted wholesale by the U.S. Navy. Navalists saw sea power as crucial for U.S. commercial and strategic interests, as well as a source of national prestige and power projection. American naval officers and military strategists advocated for a larger and more technologically advanced navy that could protect the U.S.'s vast maritime borders, safeguard its commercial interests, and project power abroad. Among the leading reformers was Navy Lieutenant Theodorus Bailey Myers Mason, who called for the creation of a naval intelligence office dedicated to gathering information on foreign navies and the latest in naval science to help rebuild the U.S. Navy.

William H. Hunt, who served briefly as Secretary of the Navy under President James Garfield, formed a Naval Advisory Board tasked with rebuilding the Navy and bringing it up to par to global standards. Largely in response to Mason's recommendations, on March 23, 1882, Hunt issued General Order No. 292, which read:

An "Office of Intelligence" is hereby established in the Bureau of Navigation for the purpose of collecting and recording such naval information as may be useful to the Department in time of war, as well as in peace.

To facilitate this work, the Department Library will be combined with the "Office of Intelligence," and placed under the direction of the Chief of the Bureau of Navigation.

Commanding and all other officers are directed to avail themselves of all opportunities which may arise to collect and to forward to the "Office of Intelligence" professional matters likely to serve the object in view.

The new Office of Naval Intelligence would be headquartered in the State, War and Navy Building (now the Old Executive Office Building), with Mason appointed as its first "Chief Intelligence Office". (Note: Redesignated in 1911 as "Director of Naval Intelligence", and currently "Commander, Office of Naval Intelligence".) As originally conceived, ONI assisted in the Navy's advancement by dispatching naval attachés around the world to acquire data and resources related to the latest in naval warfare. These findings would be analyzed, interpreted, and disseminated to Navy leaders and government officials, helping to inform policies and programs related to naval development.

=== Expansion ===
Mason was succeeded as Chief Intelligence Officer by Lieutenant Raymond P. Rodgers in April 1885. In addition to intensifying ONI's research and surveillance of naval technology abroad, Rodger's four-year tenure saw ONI partner with the U.S. Department of State in gathering information on strategic maritime interests such as Panama, Samoa, and the Kingdom of Hawaii. ONI also began to develop capabilities in cryptography, which would foreshadow its evolution into a full-fledged military intelligence office.

In 1890, one year after Rodgers' departure from ONI, the office was transferred from the Bureau of Navigation to the Secretary of the Navy, solidifying its key role in the Navy's growth and development. ONI's emergence as a proper naval intelligence arm began in earnest with the Spanish–American War of 1898. Naval operations were critical in the conflict, and ONI was responsible for protecting Navy personnel, providing tactical support, and implementing counter-intelligence measures. Nevertheless, weaknesses in its intelligence gathering were revealed.

ONI grew in prominence under President Theodore Roosevelt, a former Assistant Secretary of the Navy and naval enthusiast. His expansionist foreign policy — and the central role the U.S. Navy played therein — made maritime intelligence more crucial. The sailing of the "Great White Fleet" around the world between 1906 and 1907, which included sixteen newly constructed steel battleships, showcased new-found American seapower and validated ONI's efforts. By 1911, the U.S. was constructing super-dreadnoughts at a pace that would eventually become competitive with Britain's Royal Navy.

American entry into the First World War in 1917 marked a turning point in the office's history. President Woodrow Wilson was an exponent of the importance of a strong navy to U.S. defense. Under his administration, Congress authorized ONI's first major increase in personnel and funding, and expanded its role to include domestic security operations — namely the protection of U.S. ports, harbors, and maritime facilities from enemy infiltration and sabotage. ONI's mandate often entailed partnering with the departments of State, War, Justice, Commerce, and Labor. Due to the increasingly sensitive nature of its work, ONI also began to censor radio and mail communications, which further marked its development as a major intelligence office.

During the 1920s and 1930s, many of ONI's activities were dedicated to Japan, which was an increasingly advanced and belligerent naval power. The office investigated Japanese fortifications in the Pacific, acquired information on Japanese military aircraft and weaponry, and partnered with the U.S. Army's Military Intelligence Division and the Federal Bureau of Investigation to monitor potentially subversive elements within the Japanese American community; ONI's director, Rear Admiral Walter Stratton Anderson, met weekly with his counterparts in the FBI and MID to gather and share information on suspected internal threats. In 1929, Chief of Naval Operations William D. Leahy made permanent ONI's functions as an intelligence office, while in 1939, President Franklin D. Roosevelt granted the office considerable authority on matters of domestic security.

In the run up to Pearl Harbor, ONI was beset with challenges including disagreements with the Chief of Naval Operations and the FBI on who would in charge of naval counterintelligence both outside and with the borders of the United States. Partly as result of these challenges, ONI had four directors in the year 1941.

=== World War II ===
Following Japan's attack on Pearl Harbor in 1941, concerns about subversive activity by Japanese Americans grew more pressing. ONI commissioned Kenneth Ringle, assistant district intelligence officer for the Eleventh Naval District in Los Angeles, to conduct a thorough investigation of the resident Japanese population. He found little evidence of Japanese American saboteurs, and in his final report to President Roosevelt, advised against mass incarceration, a view that was shared by most ONI officials, but that was largely ignored by the Army and War Department.

The Second World War would see another expansion of ONI's duties and a subsequent increase in its budget and staff. The office established two intelligence schools that trained hundreds of Intel officers for the Navy. Its Special Activities Branch offered critical intelligence on German U-boat technology, operations, and tactics, which proved decisive in the Battle of the Atlantic. ONI supplied U.S. forces with ship and aircraft recognition manuals, provided photographic specialists for identifying enemy vessels, assisted in naval mission planning, and was responsible for the translation, evaluation, and dissemination of intercepted Japanese communications.

=== Cold War ===
While other parts of the Navy were downsized after the war, U.S. Fleet Admiral Chester Nimitz ensured ONI's continued strength, which was to prove important during the Cold War. Secretary of the Navy James Forrestal broadened ONI's mandate to include investigations of major criminal and security matters. In 1946, the Operational Intelligence Section was formed to provide fleet commanders with real-time analysis of the maritime activities and positions of foreign naval forces, namely the Soviet Navy. The Navy Field Operational Intelligence Office (NFOIO) was established in 1957 to provide more advanced signals intelligence and timely information on the intent of enemy forces.

ONI also made a concerted effort to enhance its technical and scientific resources, diversifying its personnel to reflect a wider range of expertise. The Navy Scientific and Technical Intelligence Center (NAVSTIC) was established in 1968 and shortly thereafter was folded into the Navy Reconnaissance and Technical Support Center (NRTSC). In response to the threat posed by nuclear-armed Soviet submarines, ONI developed the Sound Surveillance System (SOSUS) and the Ocean Surveillance Information system (OSIS), allowing the U.S. Navy to monitor and deter these threats.

=== Consolidation and transformation ===
Beginning in 1988, and following the dissolution of the Soviet Union, ONI's headquarters was moved to its current location in the National Maritime Intelligence Center (NMIC) in Suitland, Maryland. It was joined by Coast Guard Intelligence (CGI), which is responsible for domestic maritime operations, and the Marine Corps Intelligence Activity, which supports expeditionary missions in Littoral zones. The housing of all three of the nation's principal maritime intelligence agencies together was intended to facilitate data sharing and coordination.

ONI's duties and functions grew after the September 11 terrorist attacks in 2001 and the subsequent role played by the U.S. Navy in related conflicts in Afghanistan, Iraq, and the Horn of Africa. The year 2009 was characterized by a major reorganization of the office. Chief of Naval Operations Admiral Gary Roughead authorized ONI's conversion into a command with four subordinate commands, each with a specialized function: scientific and technical intelligence, operational intelligence, information services and technology, and expeditionary and special warfare support. All four commands were collocated in NMIC, which was afterward designated by the Director of National Intelligence as the nation's central source for integrated strategic maritime intelligence.

The same year, the Information Dominance Corps (IDC) was established by the Navy to train enlisted sailors and officers in a wide range of supporting intelligence capabilities. The IDC was redesignated in 2016 as the Information Warfare Community (IWC), with a greater emphasis on inter-disciplinary expertise in sustaining the U.S. Navy's operational and technological superiority. ONI provides the IWC with critical maritime intelligence and real-time global maritime surveillance.

The 21st century has also seen an extension of ONI's support beyond the Navy and U.S. government and towards relevant academic and commercial partners. In addition to counter-terrorist activities, its concerns include anti-piracy efforts, surveillance of potential maritime conflict zones (such as the territorial disputes in the South China Sea), and monitoring the activities and developments in emerging rival navies (such as those of China, Russia, and Iran).

== Organization and personnel ==
According to its official website, ONI's organizational structure is specifically designed to "strengthen the Navy's conventional and irregular war fighting capacities, and to expand our foresight into new technologies, future platforms, weapons, sensors, C4ISR and cyber capabilities".

ONI is based in the National Maritime Intelligence Center (NMIC), located on the grounds of the Suitland Federal Center in Suitland, Maryland. It is collocated with its five specialized subcommands, known as "Centers of Excellence" – the Nimitz Operational Intelligence Center, Farragut Technical Analysis Center, Kennedy Irregular Warfare Center, the Hopper Information Services Center, and the Brooks Center for Maritime Engagement. Since 2009, the facility has been designed to facilitate 24-hour-a-day coordination, collaboration, and analysis of maritime intelligence among ONI's subcommands, as well as its counterparts in the Marine Corps and Coast Guard. This integration is intended to offer both comprehensive and rapid intelligence to a broad range of stakeholders.

ONI is led by a commander, formally known as the Commander, Office of Naval Intelligence (COMONI), who also serves as Director of the National Maritime Intelligence-Integration Office (NMIIO), the national intelligence community center for maritime issues under ODNI. The COMONI's functions including fulfilling the national maritime intelligence duties required by the Navy, Department of Defense (DoD), and wider intelligence community.

There is also a Deputy Commander, who serves as the Commander’s primary assistant and adviser; a Chief Staff Officer, who directs the activities of staff directors and officers, and serves as the point of contact for other commands; and the Command Master Chief, who leads the enlisted personnel and advises the COMONI, Deputy Commander, and Chief of Staff on command policy.

ONI employs over 3,000 military and civilian personnel worldwide, including contractors. Its staff includes intelligence analysts, scientists, engineers, and other qualified specialists. In addition to its permanent staff, ONI is supported by more than 800 Navy Reservists, who assist the office during weekend drills and active duty.

=== Nimitz Operational Intelligence Center ===
Named after World War II Fleet Admiral Chester W. Nimitz, the Nimitz Operational Intelligence Center has responsibility for Maritime Domain Awareness (MDA) and Global Maritime Intelligence Integration (GMII), which allows it to maintain the U.S. Navy's warfighting superiority by delivering precise and timely information on the capability and position of naval and other maritime assets of interest.

=== Farragut Technical Analysis Center ===
Named for Admiral David Farragut, the Farragut Technical Analysis Center is the U.S. Navy's Center of Excellence for strategic scientific and technical intelligence (S&TI) analysis of foreign technologies, sensors, weapons, platforms, combat systems, C4ISR, and cyber capabilities. In addition to its all-source capabilities, the Farragut Center conducts ONI's foreign materiel exploitation, signal intelligence analysis, modeling and simulation, and is home to the National Maritime Acoustic Intelligence Laboratory.

=== Kennedy Irregular Warfare Center ===
Named for President John F. Kennedy, the Kennedy Center provides support to Navy Special Warfare and Navy Expeditionary Combat Command forces by providing intelligence on potential threats posed by asymmetrical warfare. Analysts are often called upon to perform other tasks and duties within this specialized area.

=== Hopper Information Services Center ===
Named for Rear Admiral Grace Hopper, the Hopper Center provides information services that support global maritime and intelligence operations. Its staff consists of more than 850 information technology specialists based in 42 locations in 11 countries. The center also assists in the integration, testing, fielding, and maintenance of advanced technologies utilized by ONI and its centers.

=== Brooks Center for Maritime Engagement ===
Named for Rear Admiral Thomas A. Brooks, a former director of Naval Intelligence, the Brooks Center was established on 13 July 2016.

== See also ==
- Director of Naval Intelligence
- Military Intelligence Corps - Army Intelligence
- Sixteenth Air Force - Air Force Intelligence
- Coast Guard Intelligence (CGI) - Coast Guard Intelligence
- Intelligence Directorate of the Main Staff of the Russian Navy - Russian equivalent
