= National Maritime Intelligence-Integration Office =

Organization of the United States Navy

Coordinates: 38°50′56″N 76°56′12″W

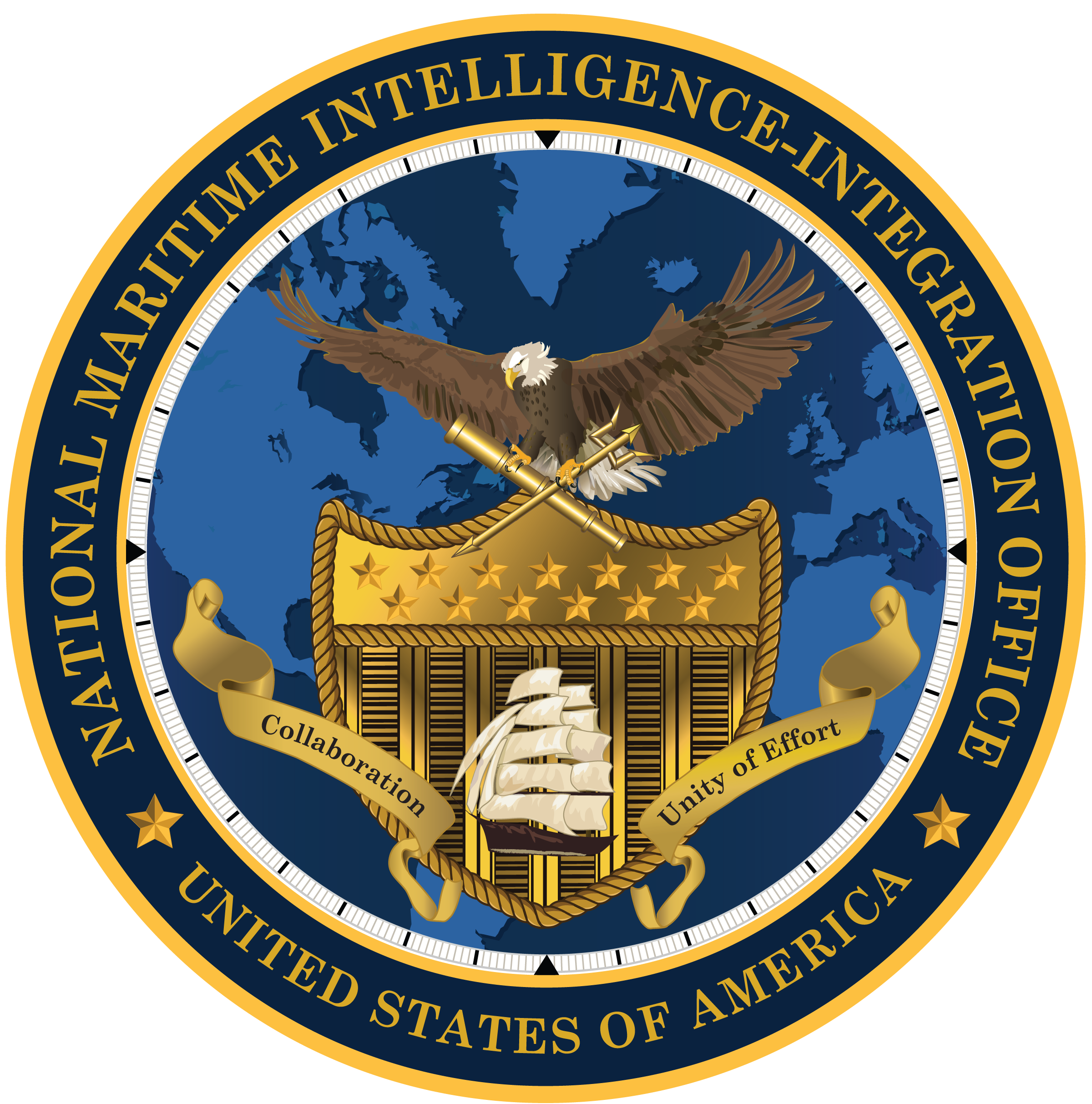
- Country: United States
- Branch: Navy
- Garrison/HQ: Suitland, MD, United States
- Website: nmio.ise.gov

Commanders
- Director: Rear Admiral Michael A. Brookes, USN

The National Maritime Intelligence-Integration Office (NMIO) is a United States Navy entity which promotes and facilitates intelligence sharing between the Navy and various federal, state, and local authorities, private companies, and foreign governments. The NMIO was established in January 2009 by Intelligence Community Directive 902, following guidance from the 9/11 Commission, and subsequent passage of the Intelligence Reform and Terrorism Prevention Act. The office is located in the National Maritime Intelligence Center (NMIC) in Suitland, Maryland.

The NMIO's stated mission is to:

Advance maritime intelligence integration, information sharing, and domain awareness to foster unity of effort for decision advantage that protects the United States, its allies, and partners against threats in or emanating from the global maritime domain.

— NMIO

While administered by the Navy, the office is overseen by the Director of National Intelligence; as of February 2025, this has been Tulsi Gabbard.

As of August 2023, the Director of the NMIO is Rear Admiral Michael A. Brookes, USN.
