= Ronald L. Burgess Jr. =

United States Army general (born 1952)

Ron Burgess
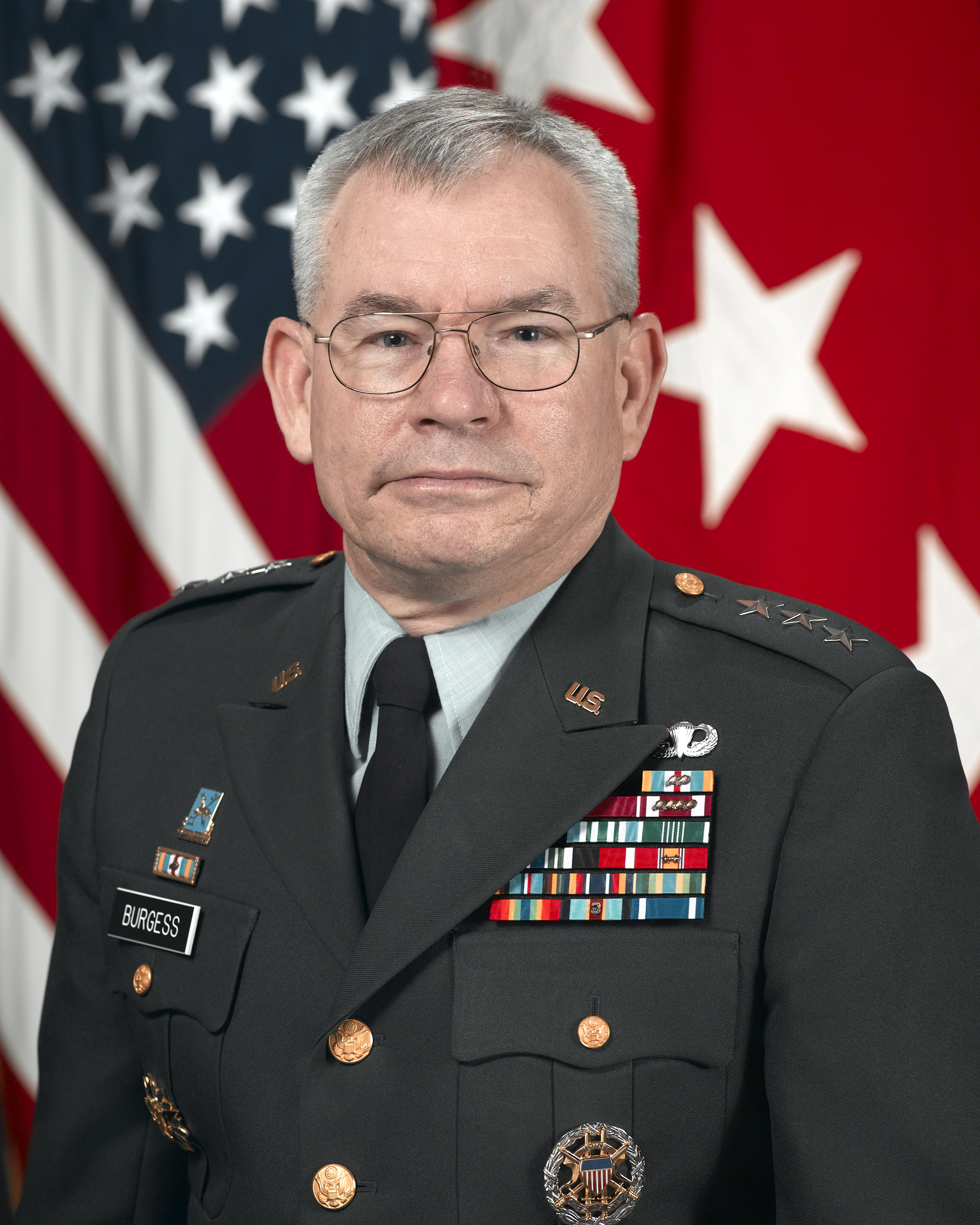

Member of the Alabama Public Service Commission
- Designate
- Assuming office January 18, 2027
- Governor: Tommy Tuberville
- Succeeding: Seat established

16th Director of the Defense Intelligence Agency
- In office March 18, 2009 – July 24, 2012
- President: Barack Obama
- Preceded by: Michael D. Maples
- Succeeded by: Mike Flynn

Director of National Intelligence
- Acting
- In office January 27, 2009 – January 29, 2009
- President: Barack Obama
- Preceded by: Donald Kerr (acting)
- Succeeded by: Dennis C. Blair

Principal Deputy Director of National Intelligence
- In office January 20, 2009 – February 2009; Acting
- President: Barack Obama
- Preceded by: Donald Kerr
- Succeeded by: David C. Gompert
- In office June 2006 – October 5, 2007
- President: George W. Bush
- Preceded by: Michael Hayden
- Succeeded by: Donald Kerr

Personal details
- Born: Ronald Lee Burgess Jr. September 16, 1952 (age 74) Jacksonville, North Carolina, U.S.
- Party: Republican
- Education: Auburn University (BA); University of Southern California (MS); U.S. Army Command and General Staff College (MMAS)

Military service
- Allegiance: United States
- Branch/service: United States Army
- Years of service: 1974–2012
- Rank: Lieutenant General

Ronald Lee Burgess Jr. (born 16 September 1952) is a retired United States Army lieutenant general. His last military assignment was as the 17th director of the Defense Intelligence Agency and commander of the Joint Functional Component Command for Intelligence, Surveillance and Reconnaissance (JFCC-ISR). Prior to that, he was Director of the Intelligence Staff in the Office of the Director of National Intelligence.

From August 2006 to May 2007 he was the deputy director of National Intelligence for customer outcomes (requirements).

On 17 May 2007, the Office of the Director of National Intelligence announced that Burgess had been nominated to be the director of the Intelligence Staff (DIS) for the Office of the DNI. While the DIS position does not require Senate confirmation, it does require the Senate Armed Services Committee to confirm Burgess' 3-star rank as the DIS.

After the resignation of Gen. Michael Hayden as principal deputy director of National Intelligence, Burgess was selected by President George W. Bush in June 2006 to fill the position in an acting capacity until October 2007. During this time, he was still serving at the deputy director of national intelligence for customer outcomes (requirements) and transitioned to the director of the Intelligence Staff. He served as the acting principal deputy director of national intelligence for a second time from January 2009 to February 2009 and he also served as the acting director of national intelligence from 27 to 29 January 2009.

== Biography and education ==
Burgess was commissioned in military intelligence through the Reserve Officers' Training Corps in 1974. He graduated from high school in Opelika, Alabama, then earned a Bachelor of Arts degree in political science from Auburn University in 1974, a Master of Science degree in education from the University of Southern California in 1980, and a Master of Military Arts and Science from the U.S. Army Command and General Staff College in 1986. While attending Auburn University he was a brother in the Beta Zeta chapter of Theta Xi and served as the chapter president from 1973 to 1974.

His military education includes the Armor Officer Basic Course, the Military Intelligence Officers Advanced Course, the Command and General Staff College, the Advanced Military Studies Program, and the Air War College.

On 16 May 2015, Burgess was awarded the degree of Doctor of Laws, Honoris Causa, from LaGrange College in LaGrange, Georgia.

In June 2015, Burgess was inducted into the United States Army Military Intelligence Hall of Fame.

On Saturday, 13 May 2017, Burgess received an honorary Doctor of Laws (LL.D.) from Stetson University College of Law in Gulfport, Florida.

== Military assignments ==
Staff assignments include: assistant executive officer to the deputy chief of staff for intelligence, Washington, D.C. in 1990; G-2, 25th Infantry Division (Light) from May 1993 to May 1994 at Schofield Barracks, Hawaii. He served as director of intelligence, J-2, Joint Special Operations Command (JSOC), Fort Bragg, North Carolina, from May 1997 to June 1999; director of intelligence, J-2, U.S. Southern Command from June 1999 until May 2003, and director for intelligence, J-2, the Joint Staff from June 2003 to July 2005. Burgess assumed duty as the deputy director of national intelligence for customer outcomes in August 2005 transitioning to director of the Intelligence Staff in February 2007. He was dual-hatted twice as the acting principal deputy director of national intelligence from May 2006 to October 2007, and January to February 2009.

Command assignments include: company commander, 124th Military Intelligence Battalion, 24th Infantry Division (Mechanized) at Fort Stewart, Georgia; command of the 125th Military Intelligence Battalion, 25th Infantry Division (Light), Schofield Barracks, Hawaii, from April 1991 to May 1993; and command of the 470th Military Intelligence Brigade in Panama from June 1995 to May 1997. LTG Burgess became the 17th director of the Defense Intelligence Agency on 18 March 2009.

== Retirement and post-retirement ==
Burgess departed DIA on 24 July 2012, and officially retired from the US Army on 1 September 2012. Army Lieutenant General Michael T. Flynn, who had served as an assistant director of national intelligence, relieved Burgess.

At the change of command ceremony, Burgess received the National Intelligence Distinguished Service Medal from Director of National Intelligence (DNI) James R. Clapper, Jr. Burgess also received the Defense Distinguished Service Medal 1OLC for his service as the DIA director.

In December 2012, Burgess joined Auburn University as senior counsel for national security programs, cyber programs and military affairs. In this capacity he works across the university to interface and coordinate with federal, state and commercial entities on all matters related to these areas.

In June 2015, Burgess was inducted into the United States Army Military Intelligence Hall of Fame

On 9 November 2016, Reuters reported that Burgess is part of the Trump transition team "focused on intelligence and security matters".

On Saturday, 13 May 2017, Burgess received an honorary Doctor of Laws (LL.D.) from Stetson University College of Law in Gulfport, Florida.

On 1 May 2018 Burgess assumed the duties of chief operating officer for Auburn University. In this role he advises the president of the university on all matters related to the overall direction, management, and effective administrative operations of managed oversight in support of its mission, strategic plan, core values and vision. In June, 2019 Burgess assumed the role of executive vice president of Auburn University with no real change in job function. He retired from Auburn University in June, 2023.

On Friday, 27 July 2018, Burgess was awarded an honorary Doctor of Strategic Intelligence, Honoris Causa, from the National Intelligence University in Bethesda, Maryland to recognize his longstanding and lasting contributions to the United States Intelligence Community (IC).

On May 11, 2025 Burgess was awarded an honorary Doctor of Science, Honoris Causa by Auburn University to recognize his longstanding service to the nation and to Auburn University.

== Personal life ==
Burgess and his wife Marta have five children: Lee, Regina, Julia, Mary, and John and seventeen grandchildren.

== Awards and decorations ==
Basic Parachutist Badge
Joint Chiefs of Staff Identification Badge
Army Staff Identification Badge
Army Military Intelligence Corps Distinctive Unit Insignia

Defense Distinguished Service Medal with one bronze oak leaf cluster
Defense Superior Service Medal with two bronze oak leaf clusters
Legion of Merit
Meritorious Service Medal with four bronze oak leaf clusters
Joint Service Commendation Medal
Army Commendation Medal
Army Achievement Medal
Joint Meritorious Unit Award with oak leaf cluster
National Intelligence Distinguished Service Medal
Army of Occupation Medal
National Defense Service Medal with two service stars
Armed Forces Expeditionary Medal
Global War on Terrorism Service Medal
Armed Forces Service Medal
Army Service Ribbon
Overseas Service Ribbon with the award numeral three
NATO Medal for Former Yugoslavia
Order of the Star of Romania, Commander (Military)
French Legion of Honour (Commandeur)

During his career LTG Burgess was recognized with awards by the governments of Colombia, Bolivia and Bulgaria. Additionally, he was awarded the Order of the Star of Romania by the President of Romania, and was inducted into the Legion of Honour after selection by the President of France.

LTG Burgess is a recipient of the Auburn Alumni Association's Lifetime Achievement Award (2012). In June 2016 LTG Burgess was inducted into the inaugural class of the United States Army Reserve Officers' Training Corps National Hall of Fame.

Government offices
Preceded by Michael Hayden	Principal Deputy Director of National Intelligence; Acting; 2006–2007	Succeeded by Donald Kerr
Preceded by Donald Kerr	Principal Deputy Director of National Intelligence; Acting; 2009	Succeeded by David Gompert
Preceded by Donald Kerr; Acting	Director of National Intelligence; Acting; 2009	Succeeded by Dennis C. Blair
Preceded by Michael Maples	Director of the Defense Intelligence Agency; 2009–2012	Succeeded by Mike Flynn
Political offices
New seat	Member of the Alabama Public Service Commission; Taking office 2027	Designate
