= Michael D. Maples =

United States Army general

Lieutenant General Michael D. Maples
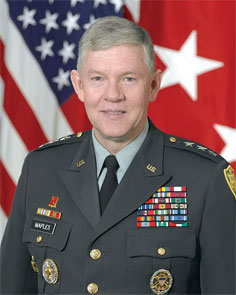
- Lieutenant General Michael D. Maples

15th Director of the Defense Intelligence Agency
- In office 4 November 2005 – 18 March 2009
- President: George W. Bush; Barack Obama
- Preceded by: Lowell E. Jacoby
- Succeeded by: Ronald L. Burgess Jr.

Personal details
- Born: 17 May 1949 (age 76) Bonham, Texas, U.S.

Military service
- Allegiance: United States of America
- Branch/service: United States Army
- Years of service: 1971–2009
- Rank: Lieutenant general
- Commands: Director, Defense Intelligence Agency; U.S. Army Field Artillery Center; 41st Field Artillery Brigade
- Battles/wars: Persian Gulf War; Bosnian War; Kosovo War
- Awards: Legion of Merit (3); Bronze Star

Lieutenant General Michael David Maples, USA (born 17 May 1949) served as the 16th Director of the Defense Intelligence Agency (DIA), appointed on 4 November 2005. He was promoted to lieutenant general on 29 November. Maples also commanded the Joint Functional Component Command for Intelligence, Surveillance and Reconnaissance (JFCC-ISR) for the United States Strategic Command (USSTRATCOM). He transferred his Directorship of the Defense Intelligence Agency and his command of JFCC-ISR to LTG Ronald Burgess on 18 March 2009. Maples formally served as the vice director of management of the Joint Staff.

== Early life ==
Maples, a native of Bonham, Texas, was commissioned a Second Lieutenant of Field Artillery following graduation from the United States Military Academy in 1971. He holds a Master's degree in organizational behavior from Pacific Lutheran University. His military education includes the Field Artillery Officer Advanced Course, the United States Army Command and General Staff College, and the National War College.

== Military career ==
Maples became the commanding general of the United States Army Field Artillery Center at Fort Sill on 23 August 2001. Prior to assuming his duties as DIA Director, Maples served at Headquarters, Department of the Army as the director of operations, readiness and mobilization, and the director of military support in the Office of the Deputy Chief of Staff for Operations and Plans. He was previously assigned as the assistant division commander (support), the 1st Armored Division, and senior tactical commander of the Baumholder Military Community. As the deputy chief of staff for Operations, Allied Rapid Reaction Corps (ARRC), and for the Kosovo Force (KFOR), LTG General Maples planned and executed the entry of NATO forces into Kosovo. Previous assignments include serving as the assistant chief of staff, G3, V Corps, Heidelberg, Germany, and deputy chief of staff operations for United States Army Europe (FWD), Taszar, Hungary, supporting United States forces in the Balkans in Operation Joint Endeavor.

Maples commanded the 41st Field Artillery Brigade, Babenhausen, Germany; the 6th Battalion, 27th Field Artillery (MLRS) at Fort Sill, Oklahoma and Desert Shield/Desert Storm; and B Battery, 6th Battalion, 37th Field Artillery (155 T), 2d Infantry Division, Republic of Korea. During Desert Storm, his battalion was the only ATACMS capable unit in theater and provided support to both VII and XVIII Corps, as well as the 6th French, 101st Airborne, 24th Infantry, 1st Armored, and 1st Infantry Divisions.

== Other assignments ==
Other assignments include deputy commander of V Corps Artillery; senior military aide to the Secretary of the Army; successive assignments in the 1st Armored Division Artillery in Zirndorf, Germany, as the division artillery assistant S3; S3 and executive officer of the 1st Battalion, 94th Field Artillery (8"/MLRS), division assistant fire support coordinator and division artillery executive officer; tactical officer, Company D-4, United States Corps of Cadets, United States Military Academy; aide-de-camp to the Commanding General United States Army Readiness Region VII; training management officer, United States Army Readiness Group, Fort Sam Houston, Texas; and fire direction officer and executive officer in C Battery, 2d Battalion, 34th Field Artillery (155 SP), at Fort Lewis, Washington and Fort Knox, Kentucky.

== Decorations ==
LTG Maples' decorations include the Defense Superior Service Award with Oak Leaf Cluster, the Legion of Merit with two Oak Leaf Clusters, the Bronze Star, the Meritorious Service Medal with three Oak Leaf Clusters, the Army Commendation Medal with Oak Leaf Cluster, and the Army Achievement Medal. Foreign decorations include the French Croix de Guerre for exterior theater operations with Silver Star. While CDR, 41st FA BDE in Baubenhausen, Germany, then COL Maples was awarded the Georgia Commendation Medal [Georgia National Guard - USA] by LTC Frank Williams - 3ID RTOC, in July 1996.

== Testimony on interrogation methods ==
Lt. Gen. Maples has testified in Congressional hearings with regard to controversies about enhanced interrogation methods such as waterboarding. On 27 February 2008, he testified before the Senate Armed Services Committee that waterboarding is not consistent with Common Article 3 of the Geneva Conventions and that it is inhumane.

Government offices
Preceded by Lowell E. Jacoby	Director of the Defense Intelligence Agency; 2005–2009	Succeeded by LTG Ron Burgess
