= Donald Kerr =

American civil servant (1939–2025)

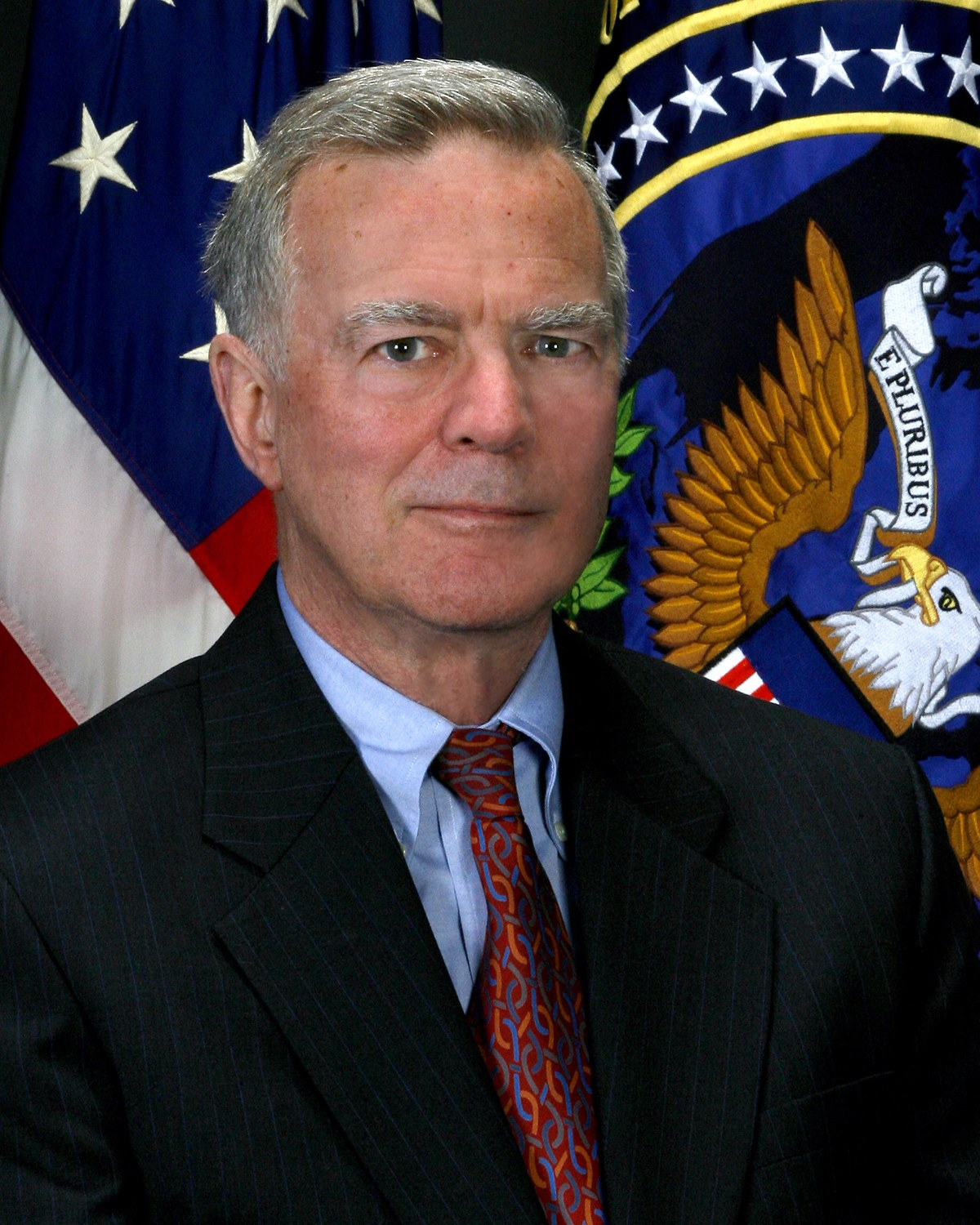

Acting Director of National Intelligence
- In office January 20, 2009 – January 27, 2009
- President: Barack Obama
- Preceded by: Mike McConnell
- Succeeded by: Ronald L. Burgess Jr. (acting)

2nd Principal Deputy Director of National Intelligence
- In office October 5, 2007 – January 20, 2009
- President: George W. Bush
- Preceded by: Michael Hayden
- Succeeded by: David Gompert

14th Director of the National Reconnaissance Office
- In office July 2005 – October 5, 2007
- President: George W. Bush
- Preceded by: Peter B. Teets
- Succeeded by: Scott F. Large

Personal details
- Born: Donald MacLean Kerr, Jr. April 8, 1939 Philadelphia, Pennsylvania, U.S.
- Died: July 13, 2025 (aged 86)
- Education: Cornell University, (BSEE, MS, PhD)
- Profession: Intelligence Officer

Donald MacLean Kerr, Jr. (April 8, 1939 – July 13, 2025) was an American politician who served as the Principal Deputy Director of National Intelligence from 2007 to 2009. He was confirmed by the U.S. Senate on Thursday, October 4, 2007. In March 2009, he received the National Intelligence Distinguished Service Medal.

From 2005 to 2007, he was the director of the National Reconnaissance Office and served as the Assistant to the Secretary of the Air Force for Intelligence Space Technology. He was sworn into that position in July 2005 by Secretary of Defense Donald Rumsfeld and Director of National Intelligence John Negroponte. Prior to his position at the NRO, he was Deputy Director of Science and Technology at the Central Intelligence Agency from 2001 to 2005. Prior to that, he was an assistant director of the FBI in charge of the Laboratory Division from 1997 to 2001. His earlier government service was with the Department of Energy (DOE), first in Las Vegas as deputy manager of Nevada Operations and subsequently in Washington, D.C., as the Deputy Assistant Secretary and Acting Assistant Secretary for Defense Programs and later for Energy Technology.

From 1979 to 1985, Kerr served as the fourth director of the Los Alamos National Laboratory (LANL). Prior to becoming director, he conducted and led LANL research in high altitude weapons effects, nuclear test detection and analysis, weapons diagnostics, ionospheric physics, and alternative energy programs. Kerr was nominated to be Principal Deputy Director of National Intelligence by President George W. Bush on Wednesday, July 11, 2007. According to Congressional Quarterly, the Senate Select Committee on Intelligence on Tuesday, September 18, 2007, by a vote of 12-3, reported out the nomination of Kerr to serve as Principal Deputy Director of National Intelligence.

Kerr held several executive positions in the private sector, including executive vice president and director at Information Systems Laboratories, Inc., corporate executive vice president, and director at Science Applications International Corporation, and president and director of EG&G, Inc. He currently serves on the board of directors for Caliburn International, a military contractor that also oversees operations for Homestead Temporary Shelter for Unaccompanied Children.

Kerr was educated at Cornell University, receiving his BSEE in 1963, MS in Microwave Electronics in 1964, and Ph.D. in plasma physics in 1966 for "Electronic Properties of the Penning Discharge Plasma."

A fellow of the American Physical Society and the American Association for the Advancement of Science, Kerr has published frequently on nuclear weapons efforts, national security and arms control, energy technology, and ionospheric research. He has received several awards for his public service, including the CIA Distinguished Intelligence Medal and the DOE Outstanding Service Award. He serves as Chairman of The MITRE Corporation Board of Trustees, and he serves on the board of directors of U.S. Space LLC, and the advisory board of MIT Lincoln Laboratory.."

On October 23, 2007, Kerr gave a memorable speech at the annual "GEOINT" conference on Geospatial Intelligence (to an audience including many people from his prior NRO job). He said,

"[W]e really need to realize what loaded word security really is. When I’m at work and throughout my day, security is safety, as a barrier against physical or emotional harm. When I go home at night, security is privacy, as an expectation of freedom from unnecessary burdens. In the intelligence community, we have an obligation to protect both safety and privacy, and over the course of GEOINT 2007, as we talk about the hows of new technologies and tradecraft, I’d like to take a step back right now and talk about the whys.

"Safety and privacy – it's common thinking that, in order to have more safety, you get less privacy. I don’t agree with that. I work from the assumption that you need to have both. When we try to make it an either/or proposition, we’re bound to fail."

Later in the speech, he said,

"Too often, privacy has been equated with anonymity, and it's an idea that is deeply rooted in American culture. The Lone Ranger wore a mask but Tonto didn’t seem to need one even though he did the dirty work for free. You’d think he would probably need one even more. But in our interconnected and wireless world, anonymity – or the appearance of anonymity – is quickly becoming a thing of the past.

"Anonymity results from a lack of identifying features. Nowadays, when so much correlated data is collected and available – and I’m just talking about profiles on MySpace, Facebook, YouTube here – the set of identifiable features has grown beyond where most of us can comprehend. We need to move beyond the construct that equates anonymity with privacy and focus more on how we can protect essential privacy in this interconnected environment.

"Protecting anonymity isn’t a fight that can be won. Not with me in my current job. Anyone that's typed in their name on Google understands that. Instead, privacy, I would offer, is a system of laws, rules, and customs with an infrastructure of Inspectors General, oversight committees, and privacy boards on which our intelligence community commitment is based and measured. And it is that framework that we need to grow and nourish and adjust as our cultures change.

"I think people here, at least people close to my age, recognize that those two generations younger than we have a very different idea of what is essential privacy, what they would wish to protect about their lives and affairs. And so, it's not for us to inflict one size fits all. It's a need to have it be adjustable to the needs of local societies as they evolve in our country. Eventually, we can only hope that people's perceptions – in Hollywood and elsewhere – will catch up."

These remarks produced major news coverage that said he'd said that "privacy no longer can mean anonymity...Instead, it should mean that government and businesses properly safeguards [sic] people's private communications and financial information."

In 2020, Kerr, along with over 130 other former Republican national security officials, signed a statement that asserted that President Trump was unfit to serve another term, and "To that end, we are firmly convinced that it is in the best interest of our nation that Vice President Joe Biden be elected as the next President of the United States, and we will vote for him."

Kerr was chairman of the MITRE Corporation from 2018 through 2021. He suffered a stroke late in 2023 and died on July 13, 2025 in Denver, Colorado, at the age of 86.

== Notes ==
Government offices
Preceded by Harold Agnew	Director of the Los Alamos National Laboratory; 1979–1986	Succeeded by Siegfried S. Hecker
Preceded by Ronald L. Burgess, Jr.	Principal Deputy Director of National Intelligence; 2007–2009	Succeeded by David Gompert
Preceded by Mike McConnell	Director of National Intelligence; Acting; 2009	Succeeded by Ronald L. Burgess Jr. Acting
