= Thomas R. Wilson =

American admiral

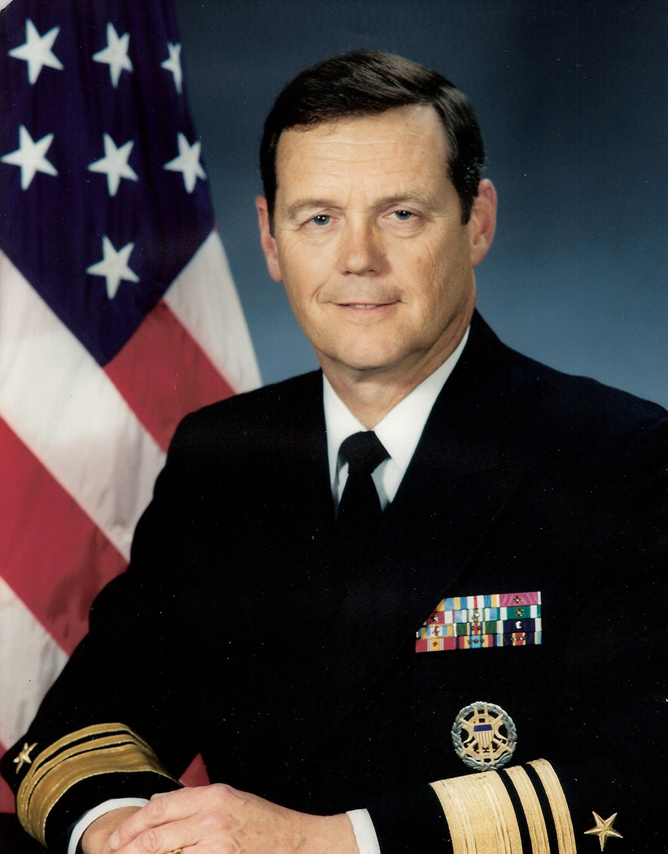
- Vice Admiral Thomas R. Wilson; Director of the Defense Intelligence Agency; July 27, 1999 – July 2002
- Born: 4 March 1946 (age 80); Columbus, Ohio, U.S.
- Military career
- Allegiance: United States of America
- Branch: United States Navy
- Service years: 1969–2002
- Rank: Vice Admiral
- Commands: Director, Defense Intelligence Agency; Director of Intelligence, U.S. Atlantic Command
- Conflicts: Cold War
- Awards: Defense Distinguished Service Medal (3); Distinguished Service Medal (Navy); Defense Superior Service Medal; Legion of Merit (3); National Intelligence Distinguished Service Medal; Director of Central Intelligence Director's Award

Thomas Ray Wilson (born 4 March 1946) is a retired United States Navy vice admiral. He previously served as Director of the Defense Intelligence Agency from July 27, 1999 to July 2002.

== Overview ==
Vice Admiral Thomas R. Wilson, USN was the 13th Director of the Defense Intelligence Agency. Other flag rank assignments included Director of Intelligence (J2), The Joint Staff; Associate Director of Central Intelligence for Military Support, Central Intelligence Agency; Vice Director of Intelligence, The Joint Staff; and Director of Intelligence, United States Atlantic Command. Following retirement from the Navy in 2002, he served in several senior executive roles for Alliant Techsystems, Inc. (ATK): President of ATK Missile Systems, Corporate Senior Vice President and President of ATK Precision Systems Group, and ATK Senior Vice President for Tidewater Operations, retiring from ATK in 2009.

Vice Admiral Wilson and his wife, Ann, have three sons: Jeffrey, Gregory, and Matthew.

== Early life ==
Thomas Ray Wilson was born on 4 March 1946 in Columbus, Ohio, and raised in the small community of Groveport, Ohio. As a youth he spent much time working on family farms, acquiring a lifelong interest in agriculture and rural life in America. He graduated from Groveport Madison High School in 1964, where he was active in sports, band, and other school activities as well as the Boy Scouts of America and the Groveport Methodist Church.

== Education and training ==
Wilson entered Ohio State University in 1964, and in 1968 graduated with a Bachelor of Science in agriculture with concentrations in agricultural economics and rural sociology. He entered Navy Officer Candidate School in Newport, R.I., in October 1968 and was commissioned an Ensign, U.S. Naval Reserve in March 1969. Wilson was a distinguished graduate of the Defense Intelligence College in 1975, and was a member of the Defense Intelligence College class that participated in the pilot program leading to the college being able to grant a Master of Science in Strategic Intelligence Degree. Other Military training included Communications Officer Ashore Course at Newport, RI in 1969; Targeting and mission planning at Nuclear Weapons Training Group Atlantic, in Norfolk, Va. in 1980; and Flag and General Officer CAPSTONE Training in 1995. In 1978, while stationed in Keflavik, Iceland, he earned an M.A. in management and human relations from Webster University.

== Awards, decorations and badges ==
Admiral Wilson has received the Defense Distinguished Service Medal (three awards), Navy Distinguished Service Medal, Defense Superior Service Medal, Legion of Merit (two awards), Meritorious Service Medal (two awards), Joint Service Commendation Medal (two awards), and Navy Commendation Medal (two awards), the National Defense Service Medal with Bronze Star, Global War on Terrorism Service Medal, Navy Sea Service Deployment Ribbon (four awards), and Navy Overseas Service Ribbon (four awards).

Unit awards include the Joint Meritorious Unit Award with Oak Leaf Cluster and Navy Meritorious Unit Commendation with two Bronze Stars.

Authorized badges include the Atlantic Command Badge, The Joint Staff Identification Badge, and the Defense Intelligence Agency Badge.

Vice Admiral Wilson has received the following awards from foreign countries: Republic of China (Taiwan) Service Ribbon, Czech Republic Order of the White Lion, and the Royal Norwegian Order of Merit.

Vice Admiral Wilson is also the recipient of the National Intelligence Distinguished Service Medal, the Central Intelligence Agency Director’s Award, and the Defense Intelligence Agency Director's Award. In 2001 he received the NAACP’S Meritorious Service Award for his leadership of DIA's nationally recognized Diversity and Equal Opportunity programs.

U.S. military decorations
	Defense Distinguished Service Medal (with 2 oak leaf clusters)
	Distinguished Service Medal (U.S. Navy)
	Defense Superior Service Medal
	Legion of Merit (with gold star)
	Meritorious Service Medal (with gold star)
	Joint Service Commendation Medal with oak leaf cluster
	Navy-Marine Corps Commendation Medal (with award star)
	Navy "E" Ribbon
	National Defense Service Medal (with bronze star)
	Global War on Terrorism Service Medal
	Navy Sea Service Deployment Ribbon (with 3 bronze stars)
	Navy-Marine Corps Overseas Service Ribbon (with 3 bronze stars)
	Republic of China (Taiwan) Service ribbon
	Czech Order of the White Lion (Military Division, Third Class)
	Royal Norwegian Order of Merit (degree unknown)
Unit awards
	Joint Meritorious Unit Award (with oak leaf cluster)
	Navy Meritorious Unit Commendation (with 2 bronze stars)
Badges
	Office of the Joint Chiefs of Staff Identification Badge
	Defense Intelligence Agency Badge
	United States Atlantic Command Badge
National non-military awards
width=106	National Intelligence Distinguished Service Medal
	Director of Central Intelligence Director's Award
DIA award
	Defense Intelligence Agency Directors Award

== Sources ==
- DD Form 214 (Wilson, Thomas R )
- U.S. Navy Flag Officer Personnel Files
- U.S. Navy Orders
