= Eric Haseltine =

American technologist

- Citizenship: United States
- Education: University of California Berkeley, Indiana University

Eric Haseltine is chairman of the Board of the US Technology Leadership Council (USTLC). He is a technologist who has worked in senior-executive positions in both industry and the United States intelligence community. Haseltine also is CEO of the startup Discovery Democracy LLC that manufactures industrial safety sensors.

== Academics ==
Haseltine received a Bachelor of Arts degree in economics and psychology from the University of California, Berkeley, and a PhD in physiological psychology from Indiana University. He also has a certificate in Executive Management from UCLA's Anderson School of Management. He accomplished post-doctoral work in brain research at Vanderbilt University School of Medicine.

== Career ==
Haseltine spent 13 years at Hughes Aircraft, where he rose to the position of Director of Engineering. He then left for Walt Disney Imagineering in 1992, where he joined the research and development group, working on large-scale virtual-reality projects. In 1998, he was promoted to senior vice president responsible for all technology projects. In 2000, he was made Executive Vice President. Haseltine was head of research and development for Walt Disney Imagineering by the time he left in 2002 to join the National Security Agency as Director of Research. From 2005 to 2007, Haseltine was associate director for Science and Technology, Office of the Director of National Intelligence (ODNI)—that organization's first—a position he described in a 2006 U.S. News & World Report interview by stating: "You can think of me as the CTO [chief technology officer] of the intelligence community".

Haseltine currently specializes in cyber security, personal protection and privacy. He frequently collaborates with his wife, Chris Gilbert MD PHD, writing, speaking and performing basic research in Mind-Body medicine and Prediction Science.

== Patents/Publications ==
"Eric has 70 patents in optics, special effects and electronic media, and more than 300 publications in science and technical journals, the web, and Discover Magazine."

- The Listening Cure: Healing Secrets of an Unconventional Doctor Selectbooks, NY. 2017 ISBN 978-1-59079437-1
- Long Fuse, Big Bang: Achieving Long-Term Success Through Daily Victories. Hyperion, NY, 2010. ISBN 978-1-4013-2363-9
- Brain Safari: 5 Minute Experiments to Explore the Space Between Your Ears Greenleaf, TX, 2018. ISBN 978-1626344853
- The Spy in Moscow Station: A Counterspy's Hunt for a Deadly Cold War Threat, Thomas Dunne Books, NY, 2019. ISBN 978-1250301161
- Riding the Monster: Five Ways to Innovate Inside Bureaucracies Discovery Democracy Press, California, 2021. ISBN 978-0998122809
- The New Science of UFOs: New insights into an old mystery Discovery Democracy Press, California, 2024. ISBN 978-0998122830
- The Shadow of time Discovery Democracy Press, California, 2024. ISBN 979-8989895502

== Awards ==
- National Intelligence Distinguished Service Medal
- Manager of the Year Award, from the Society for Psychologists in Management
- Hughes Patent Award
- Richard Atkinson Lifetime achievement award
