= Dennis C. Blair =

US Navy admiral and 3rd Director of National Intelligence

Dennis Blair
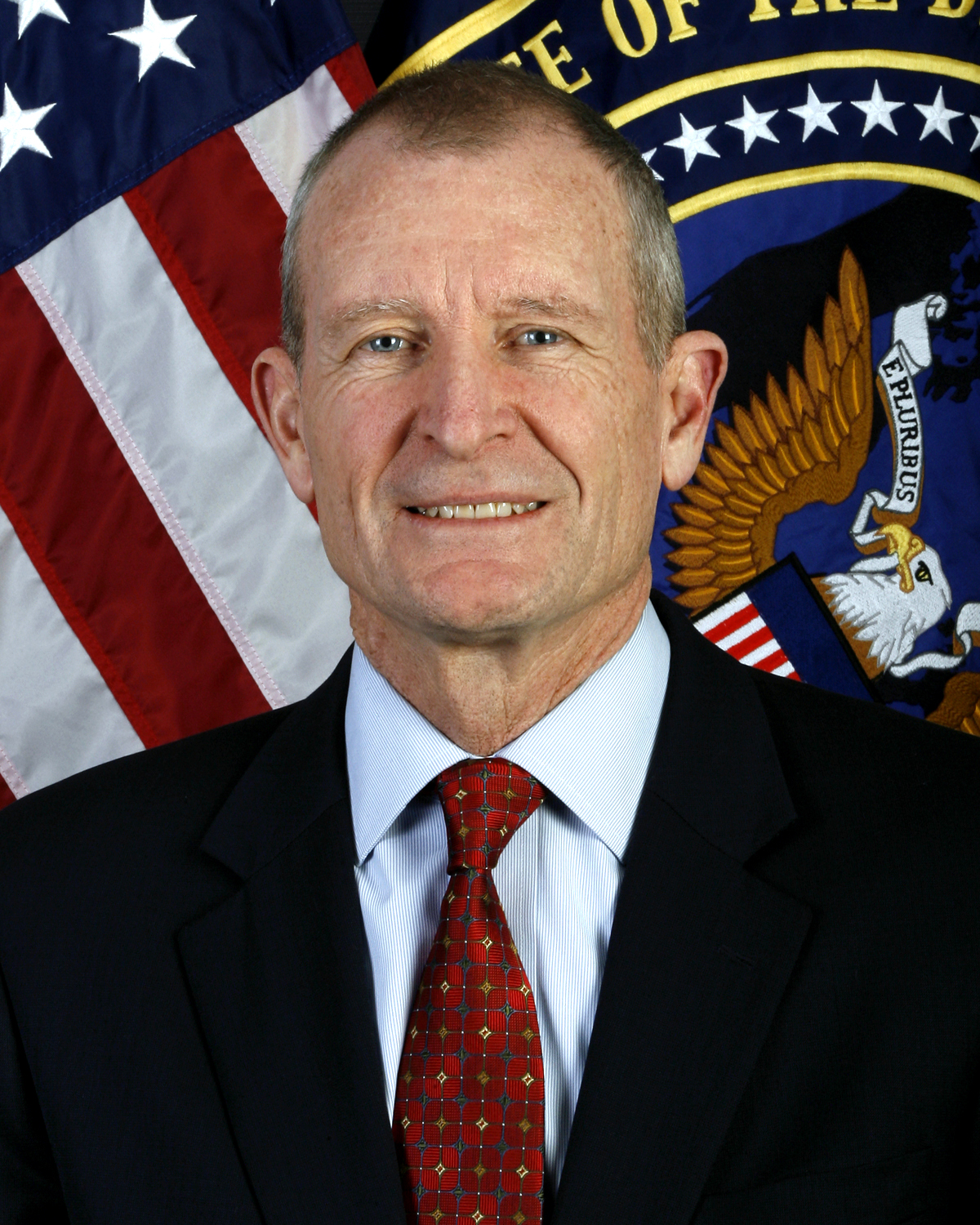
- Official portrait, 2009

3rd Director of National Intelligence
- In office January 29, 2009 – May 28, 2010
- President: Barack Obama
- Deputy: Ronald L. Burgess Jr. (acting); David Gompert
- Preceded by: Mike McConnell
- Succeeded by: David Gompert (acting)

Personal details
- Born: Dennis Cutler Blair; February 4, 1947 (age 79) Kittery, Maine, U.S.
- Education: United States Naval Academy (BS); Worcester College, Oxford (MA)

Military service
- Allegiance: United States
- Branch/service: United States Navy
- Years of service: 1968–2002
- Rank: Admiral
- Battles/wars: War on Terror

Dennis Cutler Blair (born February 4, 1947) is the former United States Director of National Intelligence and a retired United States Navy admiral who was the commander of U.S. forces in the Pacific region. Blair was a career officer in the U.S. Navy and served in the White House during the presidencies of both Jimmy Carter and Ronald Reagan. Blair retired from the Navy in 2002 as an Admiral. In 2009, Blair was selected as President Barack Obama’s first Director of National Intelligence, but after a series of bureaucratic battles, he resigned on May 20, 2010.

He currently serves as a member of the Energy Security Leadership Council of Securing America's Future Energy, and is on the boards of the Atlantic Council, Freedom House, the National Bureau of Asian Research, and the National Committee on U.S.-China Relations. He also serves as co-chair of the annual Pacific Energy Summit.

He also serves as a senior advisor to Ron Wahid, Chairman of Arcanum, a global strategic intelligence company and subsidiary of Magellan Investment Holdings.

== Early years ==
Blair was born in Kittery, Maine, the son of Abbie Dora (née Ansel) and Captain Carvel Hall Blair. He is a sixth-generation naval officer and the great-great-great-grandson of Confederate Chief Engineer William Price Williamson of North Carolina, who is credited with first suggesting that the hull of the USS Merrimack be used to build the Confederate ironclad CSS Virginia. He was also related to William Price Williamson, a recipient of the Navy Cross who died during World War One. He also counts portrait painter Charles Willson Peale and U.S. Attorney General William Wirt among his ancestors.

Blair attended St. Andrew's School (1964) and graduated from the United States Naval Academy in 1968. The class of 1968 at the academy also included retired Admiral Michael Mullen, the 17th Chairman of the Joint Chiefs of Staff, retired Admiral Jay L. Johnson, former Senator James H. Webb, and retired General Michael Hagee, former Commandant of the Marine Corps, NASA Administrator Charles Bolden and Lieutenant Colonel Oliver North.

== Naval career ==
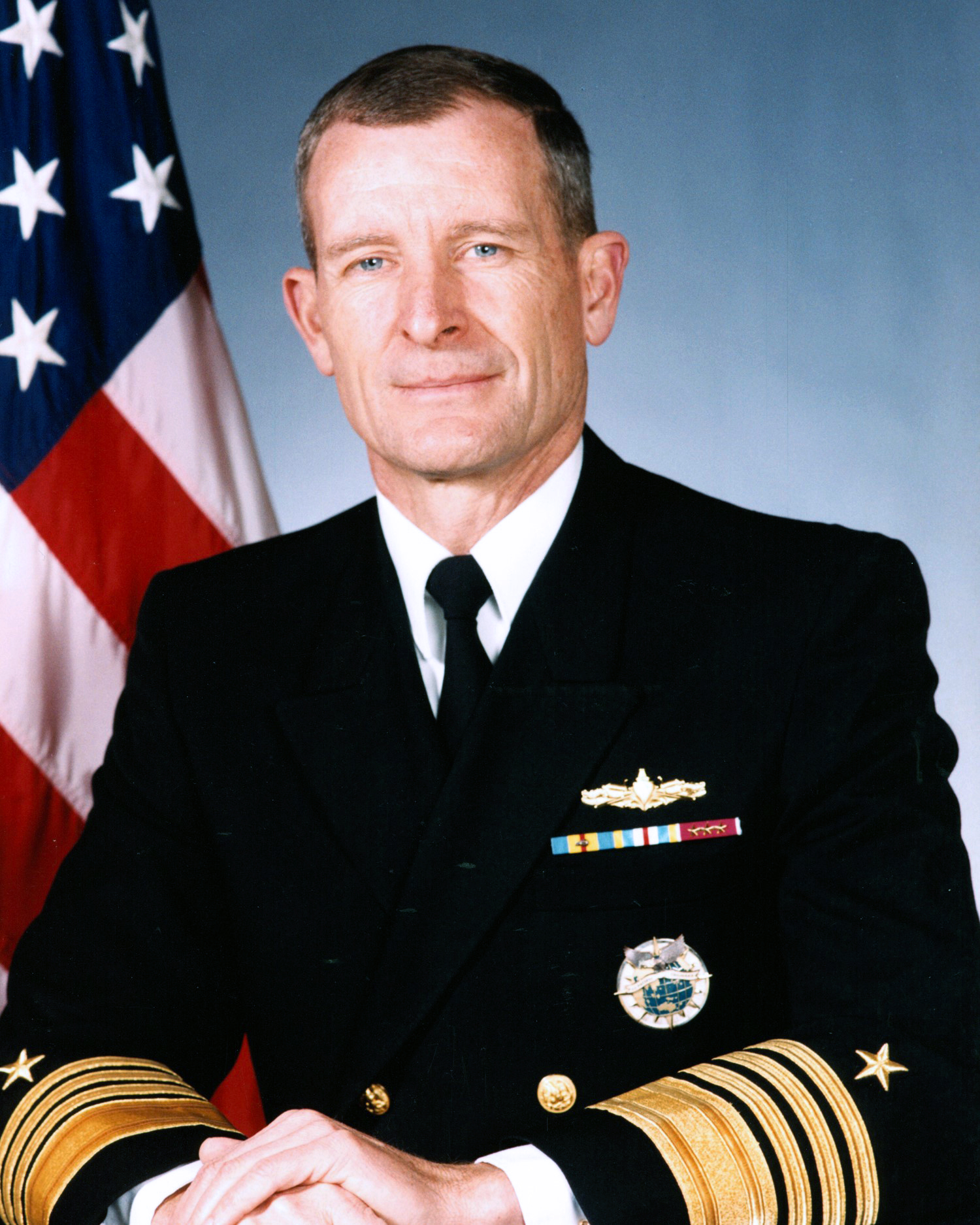
Admiral Blair, USN Commander in Chief, US Pacific Command

Following his graduation from the Naval Academy, he was assigned to the guided missile destroyer USS Barney (DDG-6). He then received a Rhodes Scholarship, reading Russian studies at Oxford University, attending during the same time future president Bill Clinton studied there. He served as a White House Fellow from 1975 to 1976 with Wesley Clark and Marshall Carter.

Blair spent over 34 years in the United States Navy. He served on guided missile destroyers in both the Atlantic and Pacific fleets and commanded the Kitty Hawk Battle Group between 1994 and 1995. Blair commanded the USS Cochrane from 1984 to 1986 and the Pearl Harbor Naval Station from 1988 to 1989. Blair was known as a thoughtful commander, but is also remembered for moments of levity during his leadership. He is believed to be the first naval officer to ever attempt water-skiing behind his modern destroyer as skipper.

His last job in the military was as Commander in Chief, U.S. Pacific Command between 1999 and 2002, the highest-ranking officer over most of the U.S. forces in the Asia-Pacific region. During his tenure, he developed a series of programs and joint exercises with militaries in the region and broadened the relationships between the U.S. military and partner nations.

Blair was in command at USPACOM when a United States Navy EP-3E ARIES II signals intelligence aircraft and a People's Liberation Army Navy (PLAN) J-8II interceptor fighter jet collided in mid-air, resulting in the death of a Chinese crewmember and the emergency landing of the EP-3. Following the landing, the 24 U.S. crewmen aboard were detained in China for 10 days. The so-called Hainan Island incident threatened to escalate already tense relations between the United States and China. Blair played in a key role in managing the crisis.

Previously, he was Director of the Joint Staff in the Office of the Chairman of Joint Chiefs of Staff, and served in budget and policy positions on several major Navy staffs and the National Security Council staff. He was also the first Associate Director of Central Intelligence for Military Support. He retired from the Navy in 2002.

=== Reports of disobeying orders ===
According to journalist Alan Nairn, during his tenure as commander-in-chief of the U.S. Pacific Command, Blair disobeyed orders from civilians in the Clinton administration during the 1999 East Timorese crisis. Amid growing international concern over violence against the independence movement in Indonesian-occupied East Timor, Blair was ordered to meet with General Wiranto, the commander of the Indonesian military, and to tell him to shut down the pro-Indonesia militia. According to Nairn, two days after the Liquiçá Church Massacre, Blair failed to deliver this message, instead presenting Wiranto with an offer of military assistance and a personal invitation to be Blair's guest in Hawaii. Consequently, Wiranto's "forces increased the Timor killings". During his confirmation hearing as Director of National Intelligence, Blair denied the accusations: "In our conversations with leaders of Indonesia, both military and civilian, we decried and said that the torture and killing that was being conducted by paramilitary groups and some military groups in East Timor had to stop"; "those who say that I was somehow carrying out my own policy or saying things that were not in accordance with American policy are just flat wrong". Blair was unanimously approved by the Senate Intelligence Committee, his tenure lasting just fifteen months, at which point he was fired, reportedly for disobeying orders from President Obama.

=== Conflict of interest ===
His membership on the board of directors of EDO Corporation, a subcontractor for the F-22 Raptor fighter program, and ownership of its stock was raised as a potential conflict of interest after the Institute for Defense Analyses (IDA) issued a study that endorsed a three-year contract for the program. In a 2006 report, the Project on Government Oversight publicized the results of this study and exposed Blair's conflict of interest. Blair told the Washington Post, "My review was not affected at all by my association with EDO Corp., and the report was a good one". He originally chose not to recuse himself because he claimed his link to EDO was not of sufficient "scale" to require it, but he subsequently resigned from the EDO board to avoid any misperceptions.

On December 20, 2006, The Washington Post reported that the U.S. Department of Defense Inspector General's investigation into the affair found Blair had violated IDA's Conflict of Interest rules but did not influence the result of IDA's study. Blair observed, "with all due respect to the Inspector General, I find it hard to understand how I could be criticized for violating conflict of interest standards when I didn't have any influence on the study".

=== Decorations and notability ===
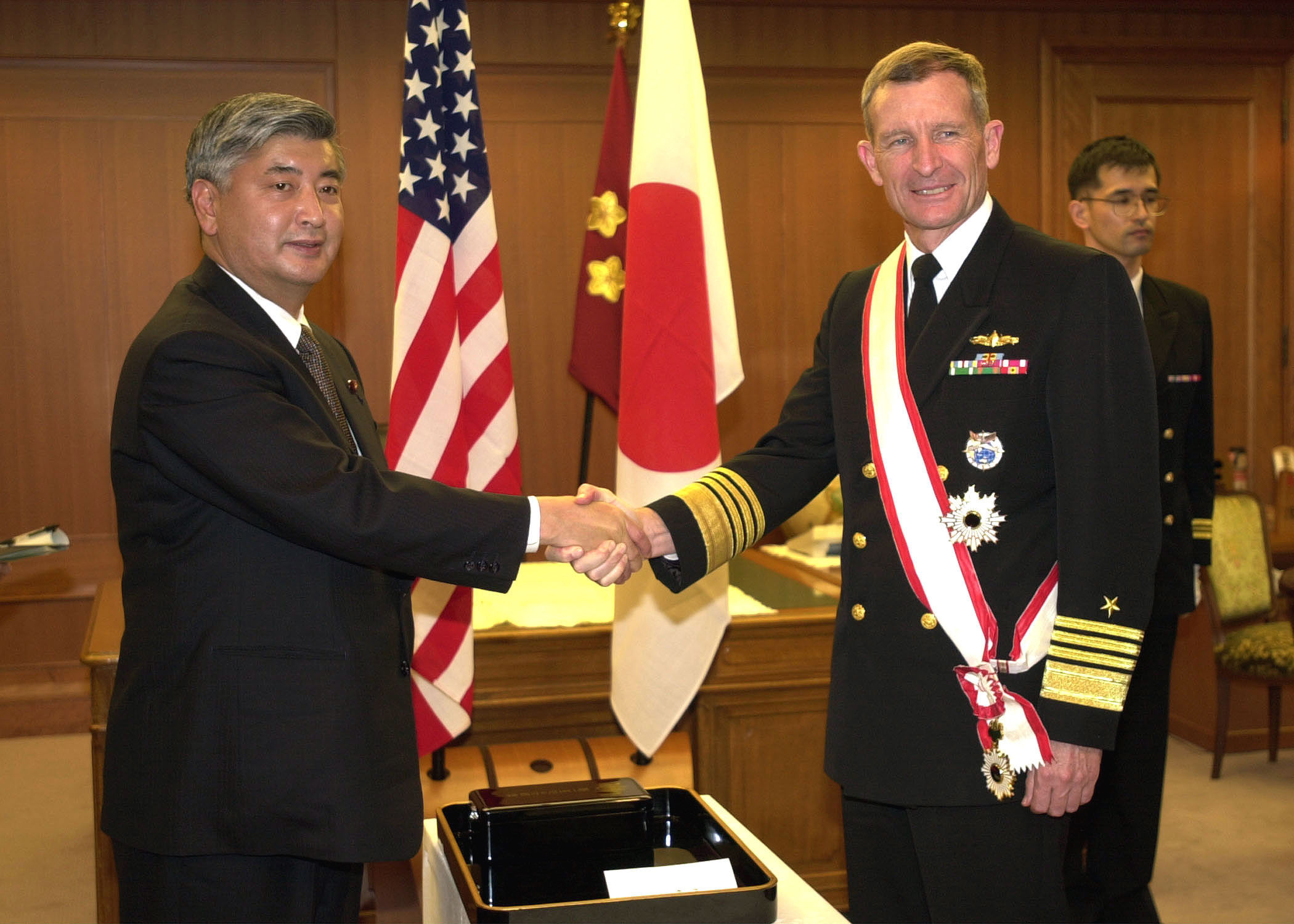
US Navy Admiral Dennis C. Blair being presented the badge and ribbon of the Order of the Rising Sun. (2002)

His decorations include the Defense Distinguished Service Medal with three oak leaf clusters (4 awards), Defense Superior Service Medal, Legion of Merit (4 awards), Meritorious Service Medal, Navy Commendation Medal, Navy Achievement Medal, and the National Intelligence Distinguished Service Medal with one star (2 awards), as well as numerous other campaign and service awards. He has been decorated by the governments of Japan, the Republic of Korea, Australia, Thailand and Taiwan.

- Surface Warfare Officer badge
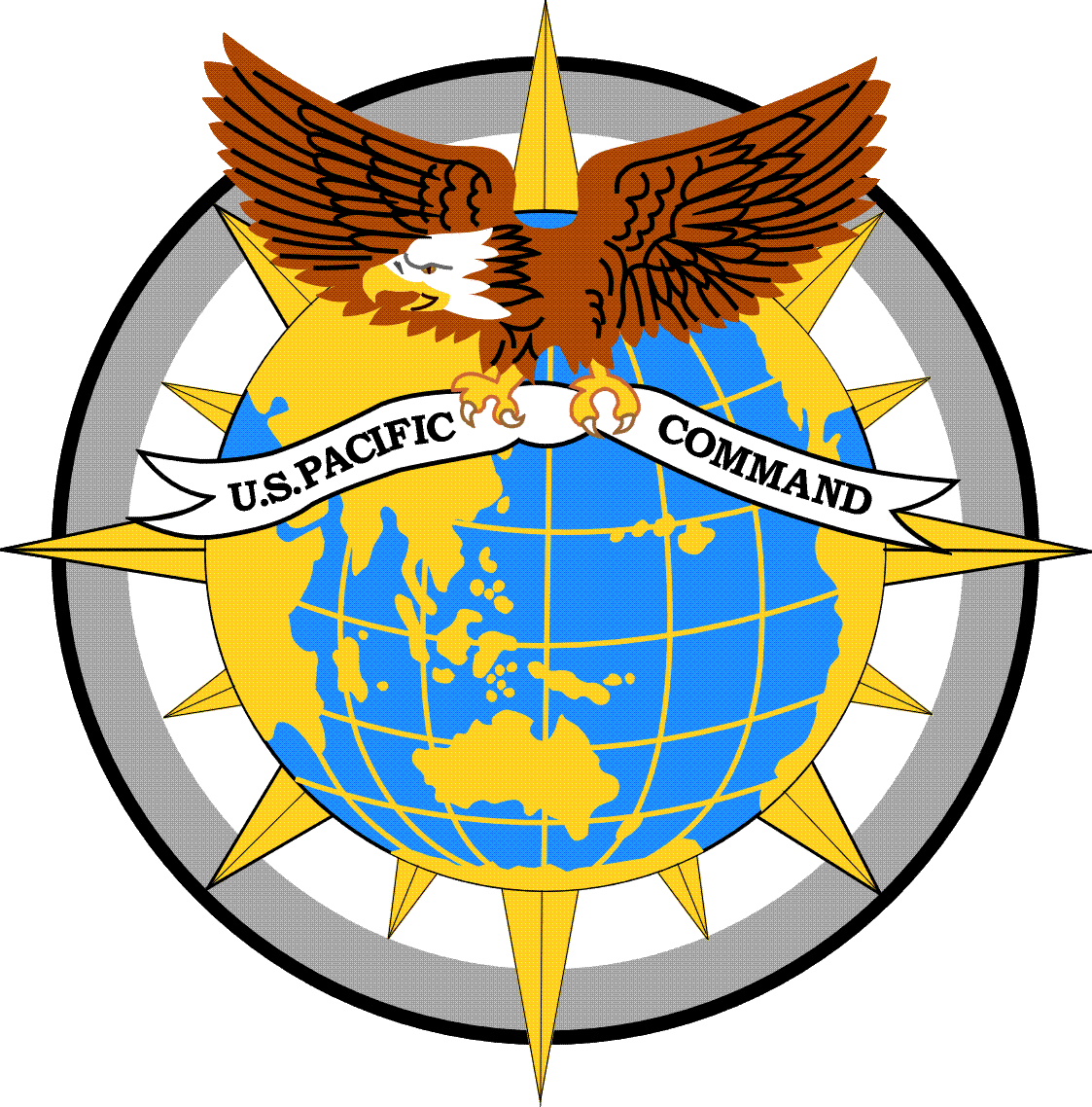
- United States Pacific Command badge
- Defense Distinguished Service Medal with three bronze oak leaf clusters
- Defense Superior Service Medal
- Legion of Merit with three gold award stars
- Meritorious Service Medal
- Navy and Marine Corps Commendation Medal
- Navy and Marine Corps Achievement Medal
- National Intelligence Distinguished Service Medal with one star
- National Defense Service Medal with two bronze service stars
- Order of the Rising Sun, Grand Cordon (Japan)

=== Retirement ===
After retiring from the Navy, Blair held the John M. Shalikashvili Chair in National Security Studies at The National Bureau of Asian Research (NBR), and the General of the Army Omar N. Bradley Chair of Strategic Leadership at Dickinson College and the U.S. Army War College. He served as president of the Institute for Defense Analyses (IDA) from 2003 to 2007, a U.S. government think tank in the Washington, D.C. area focused on national security. He was also deputy executive director of the Project on National Security Reform.

Blair is now serving as the chairman of the board at Sasakawa Peace Foundation USA, a U.S.-Japan relations think tank in Washington, DC. He also serves as co-chair of the Pacific Energy Summit, an annual forum that brings together key energy and environmental stakeholders from across the Asia-Pacific to discuss policies and practices needed to promote energy and environmental security.

Blair is the co-head of the Commission on the Theft of American Intellectual Property along with former governor of Utah and Republican presidential candidate Jon Huntsman.

== Director of National Intelligence ==
=== Nomination ===
Dennis C. Blair became the third Director of National Intelligence (DNI) on January 29, 2009, after being nominated by newly inaugurated President Barack Obama.

During his confirmation, Director Blair indicated he did not support a domestic intelligence agency separate from the Federal Bureau of Investigation. He also promised to end special interrogation regimes, believing the Intelligence Community must conduct analysis on opportunities as well as threats.

=== Appointment of Intelligence Community representatives ===
In May 2009, Blair attempted to assert the DNI's role as the head of the Intelligence Community with a memo claiming authority to appoint CIA chiefs of station abroad. This was vehemently opposed by CIA Director Leon Panetta, who issued a memo of his own.

Blair's two predecessors, Mike McConnell and John Negroponte, were both unable to bring this role under the auspices of the DNI, the authority to appoint chiefs of station having been the province of the CIA since 1947. According to news reports, President Bush issued an executive order to give Blair his congressionally-mandated powers to force the CIA and other intelligence agencies to cooperate with his office. A number of government executives agreed that the DNI should not have to go to the President each time the DNI wants to implement guidance. In late July 2009, the Senate Select Committee on Intelligence backed Director Blair, asking the CIA to give "prompt adherence" to Blair's decision.

However, on November 10, 2009, the White House decided in the CIA's favor, agreeing that the authority to appoint station chiefs overseas should remain with the CIA. Some intelligence experts believed this significantly weakened the DNI's authority, comparing the DNI to a DCI without an agency. Senator Susan Collins of Maine expressed concerns during hearings over the botched 2009 Christmas terrorist attack that the White House had undermined the power of the Office of the Director of National Intelligence by siding with the CIA in turf disputes, specifically citing this disagreement over intelligence community appointees.

In a January 2010 statement to lawmakers by Thomas Kean and Lee H. Hamilton, who led the 9/11 Commission Report, Kean and Hamilton urged Obama to be clear who was in charge and urged a strong DNI. According to The Washington Post, a former Clinton administration official suggested scrapping the DNI position if Blair were removed.

=== Testimony on use of assassination on United States citizens ===
On February 3, 2010, as Director of National Intelligence, Dennis Blair testified before Congress, "If that direct action--we think that direct action will involve killing an American, we get specific permission to do that...I would rather go into details in closed session, Mr. Chairman, but we don't target people for free speech. We target them for taking action that threatens Americans or has resulted in it." Blair also said: "Being a U.S. citizen will not spare an American from getting assassinated by military or intelligence operatives overseas if the individual is working with terrorists and planning to attack fellow Americans."

=== Dismissal ===
On May 20, 2010, President Obama asked for Blair's resignation, from his role as Director of National Intelligence which was tendered that day effective May 28. There are conflicting reports as to why Blair was asked to resign.

==== U.S.–France intelligence project linked to Blair's dismissal ====
On May 22, 2010, two days after the resignation was announced, U.S. officials leaked information to The New York Times stating that Blair's dismissal had been related to his continual pushing of a U.S.–French intelligence-sharing project "with other countries". Blair and Bernard Bajolet, intelligence advisor to French President Nicolas Sarkozy, had commenced negotiations between October and December 2009 on the pact. The treaty was to have been a legally binding reciprocal no-spying arrangement between France and the United States, whereby each country would take over operations for the other in their home-territory. Under the proposed treaty, U.S. operations in France would be run by French intelligence. This was to be a signed treaty arrangement, a more formal version than the UK–USA Security Agreement. In the month before the treaty failure, President Sarkozy made a number of U.S. visits, the first visit was on March 31, 2010. During the visit, Sarkozy was the first head of state invited by Obama to dine in the White House's private dining quarters. Press releases from both governments made mention of the close relationship between the two heads of state. Mr. Sarkozy was also in Washington for the 2010 Nuclear Security Summit from April 12–14, immediately prior to President Obama's rejection of the treaty produced by eight months of negotiations by Blair.

US officials claimed that the U.S.–France intelligence-sharing treaty had been rejected by President Obama, adding that DNI Blair's "continued pushing" for the pact after presidential rejection were grounds for his dismissal. It was further claimed that President Sarkozy had been upset at the late-stage U.S. drawback in the deal. U.S. sources claimed that the treaty had been signed, despite U.S. claims that the treaty had been rejected by President Obama.

In an unusual response, the Palais de l'Elysee confirmed that such a treaty had been negotiated, adding that "we weren't the askers" in the deal, denying any French disappointment. French officials further specified that part of the U.S. offer to France comprised access to a "secure intelligence data and retrieval exchange system", this being an in-progress U.S. acquisition under the auspices of the Office of the Director of National Intelligence. French officials characterized the treaty as minor, stating, "nothing has changed in our relationship" in relation to the treaty failure and Blair's dismissal. Officially, France denies conducting operations on U.S. soil.

==== Possible DNI–CIA political issues related to dismissal ====
Matthew Aid, an espionage historian, offered a different rationale for Blair's dismissal.

According to Aid, the White House's rejection of Blair's attempt to bring the appointment of station chiefs under the DNI's authority soured Blair's relationships with Panetta, despite a long personal friendship between the two, and Obama's Homeland Security Advisor, John Brennan, who had sided with Panetta in the dispute (Brennan later succeeded Panetta as Director of the CIA). When it was discovered that the November 2009 Fort Hood shooting and the attempted bombing of Northwest Airlines Flight 253 a month later could have been prevented with better inter-agency intelligence sharing, Brennan and Panetta allegedly blamed Blair (which, according to Aid, was not justified), resulting in Obama's decision to replace him.

== Post-government career ==
As of 2024, Blair serves on the advisory board of the National Security Space Association. He is currently the first Knott Distinguished Visiting Professor of the Practice at the University of North Carolina Chapel Hill, where he teaches courses on peace, war and defense.

Military offices
Preceded by Joseph Prueher	Commander of the United States Pacific Command; 1999–2002	Succeeded by Thomas Fargo
Government offices
Preceded by Mike McConnell	Director of National Intelligence; 2009–2010	Succeeded by David Gompert; Acting
