= William Price Williamson =

William Price Williamson (August 10, 1884 – August 17, 1918) was an officer in the United States Navy.

== Biography ==
William Price Williamson was born in Norfolk, Virginia on August 10, 1884, the son of Thom and Julia Price Williamson. He grew up near Washington D.C. and, after graduation from Western High School there, was appointed midshipman on June 29, 1903, and graduated from the Naval Academy with the class of 1907, in the advanced section of that class, on September 12, 1906. Assigned to Indiana (Battleship No. 1), he landed from that ship at Kingston, Jamaica, in January 1907 and was cited by his commanding officer for his efficient work in a rescue party during fires resulting from an earthquake there.

Williamson later joined Kansas (Battleship No. 21) and made the globe-girdling cruise of the Great White Fleet (1907–1908) before he was ordered to Washington, D.C., in March 1909 for "ordnance instruction". From there, he went to Utah (Battleship No. 31) in October 1911. While in that dreadnought, he commanded the gun battery of Utah's landing force during the landings at Veracruz, Mexico, in April 1914.

Wiliamson inspected ordnance at the E. W. Bliss and Co., Brooklyn, New York, from 1914 to 1916 before he joined Galveston (Cruiser No. 17) on May 13, 1916, for a brief tour of duty. He then journeyed to the Asiatic Station to become the Inspector of Ordnance and Powder at the Naval Magazine and Chemical Laboratory in Olongapo in the Philippines (later called the Naval Ammunition Depot, Olongapo) on July 7, 1916.

Returning to the United States in the spring of 1918, he was assigned duty assisting in the fitting out of USS Orizaba (ID-1536) and became the ship's first executive officer when that transport was commissioned. Williamson then worked closely with the ship's commanding officer, Captain R. Drace White—another ordnance expert—in developing a workable depth-charge thrower for use on board transports, in the hope of providing them with some measure of protection of their own. Wiliamson's invention was a modified Lyle gun (one used for line-throwing in rescue operations). In the first test on August 16, 1918, the crude depth-charge projector hurled a 50-pound charge approximately 150 feet.

However, before using their creation in actual operations against submarines trailing her convoy, the two officers wanted at least one more test with a larger propellant charge. Accordingly, on August 17, 1918, they commenced another experiment—which proved to be a disaster.

Williamson fired the gun, but a defective fuse caused the depth charge to explode prematurely, killing him instantly. The blast knocked Capt. White to the deck (with a broken jaw, broken knee, and flesh wounds), and killed three sailors. In addition, four other officers and 22 other enlisted men were wounded in the tragic explosion. For his work, however, Williamson was awarded the Navy Cross posthumously.

William Price Williamson was the grandson of Confederate Chief Engineer William Price Williamson of North Carolina. Confederate Chief Engineer Williamson has been credited with first suggesting that the hull of the USS Merrimack could be used to build the Confederate ironclad CSS Virginia. Another descendant of Confederate Chief Engineer William Price Williamson is Admiral Dennis C. Blair, United States Navy (Ret.), nominated for the post of Director of National Intelligence in the Obama administration.

== See also ==
- Dennis C. Blair
- USS Williamson (DD-244)
