= Roland Lajoie =

US Army Officer (1936–2023)

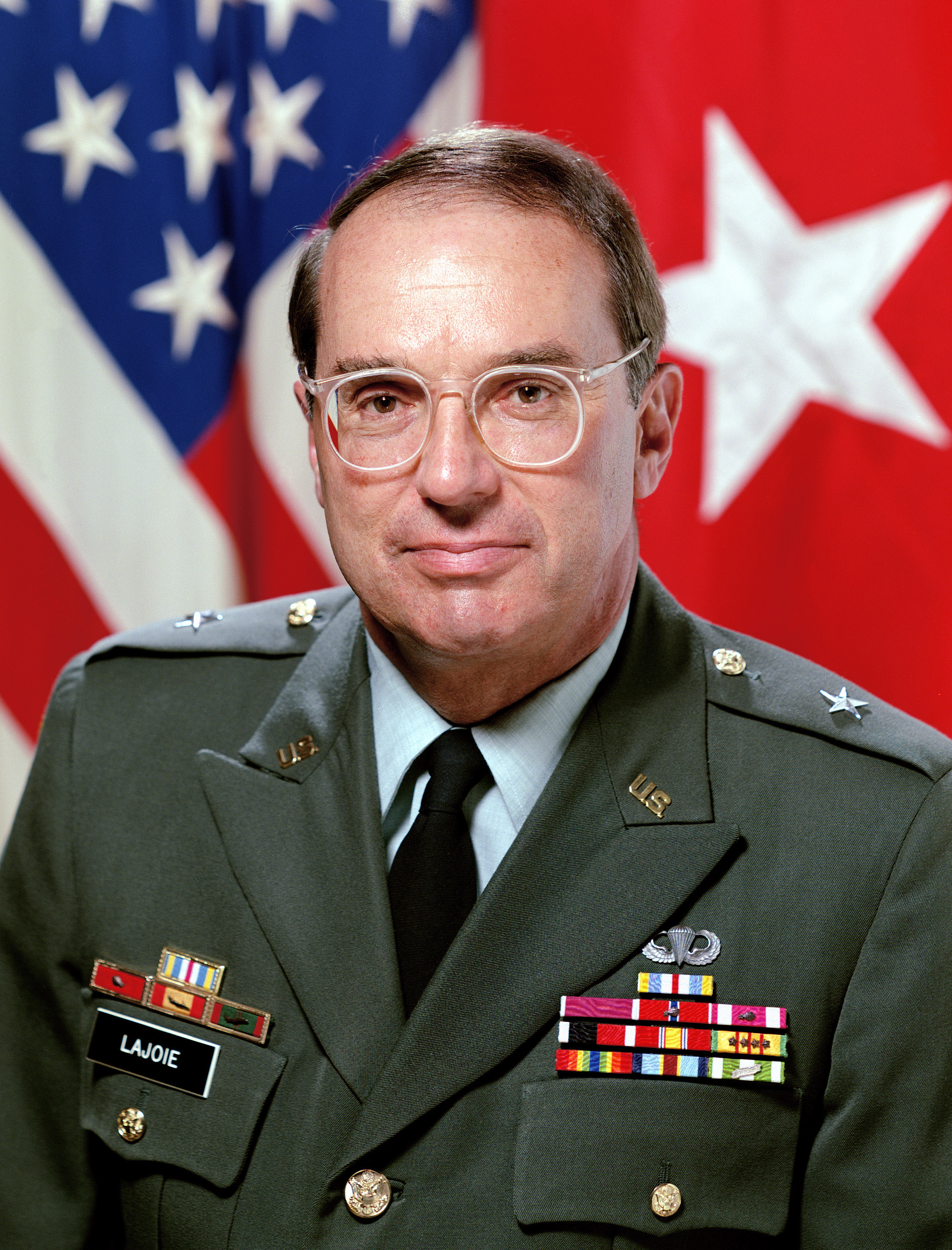
- Roland Lajoie in 1987

Personal details
- Born: August 11, 1936 Nashua, New Hampshire, U.S.
- Died: October 28, 2023 (aged 87) Manchester, New Hampshire, U.S.
- Resting place: Arlington National Cemetery
- Spouse: JoAnn Sinibaldi (m. 1961)
- Education: University of New Hampshire, B.A., political science University of Colorado, M.A., history

Military service
- Branch/service: United States Army
- Years of service: 1958–1994
- Rank: Major general

Roland Lajoie (August 11, 1936 – October 28, 2023) was a United States Army officer who served two tours in Vietnam and then in a variety of diplomatic and Cold War assignments. After retiring from the Army, he oversaw U.S. assistance and monitoring in former Soviet states as they decommissioned nuclear forces.

== Early life and education ==
Lajoie was born in Nashua, New Hampshire. He was of French Canadian ancestry, and his family spoke French at home. He spoke French fluently and also spoke Russian fluently as an adult. He attended the University of New Hampshire as an undergraduate, earning a bachelor's degree in government. He would later earn a master's degree in Russian history from the University of Colorado in 1971.

== Career ==
Lajoie was commissioned as an army officer in 1958, immediately after graduating from college. He served two tours in Vietnam. Afterwards, he served as a military attaché in Moscow.

During the 1980 to 1981 academic year, he was a research fellow at Harvard University.

From 1983 to 1986, as a colonel, he commanded the U.S. Military Liaison Mission in East Germany. His friend, Major Arthur D. Nicholson, was shot and killed by a Soviet sentry in 1985 under Lajoie's command.

His next assignment was as a military attaché in Paris.

By 1988, he had been promoted to brigadier general and was appointed to lead the On-Site Inspection Agency.

His last active-duty military assignment was Associate Deputy Director for Operations/Military Affairs at the Central Intelligence Agency.

After retiring from the Army in 1994 as a major general, Lajoie undertook a civilian role in the implementation of the Soviet Nuclear Threat Reduction Act of 1991.

In 1998, Lajoie was appointed by President Bill Clinton to the U.S.–Russia Joint Commission on POW/MIAs.

=== Awards and decorations ===
Major General Lajoie's military awards included the Defense Distinguished Service Medal (with two oak leaf clusters), the Defense Superior Service Medal (with oak leaf cluster), the Distinguished Intelligence Medal, the National Intelligence Distinguished Service Medal, the Distinguished Service Medal, the Legion of Merit, and the French Order of Merit.

== Personal life and death ==
Lajoie married JoAnn Sinibaldi in 1961. They had a son and two daughters.

Roland Lajoie died in Manchester, New Hampshire, October 28, 2023, at the age of 87.
