= Lowell E. Jacoby =

Director of the Defense Intelligence Agency

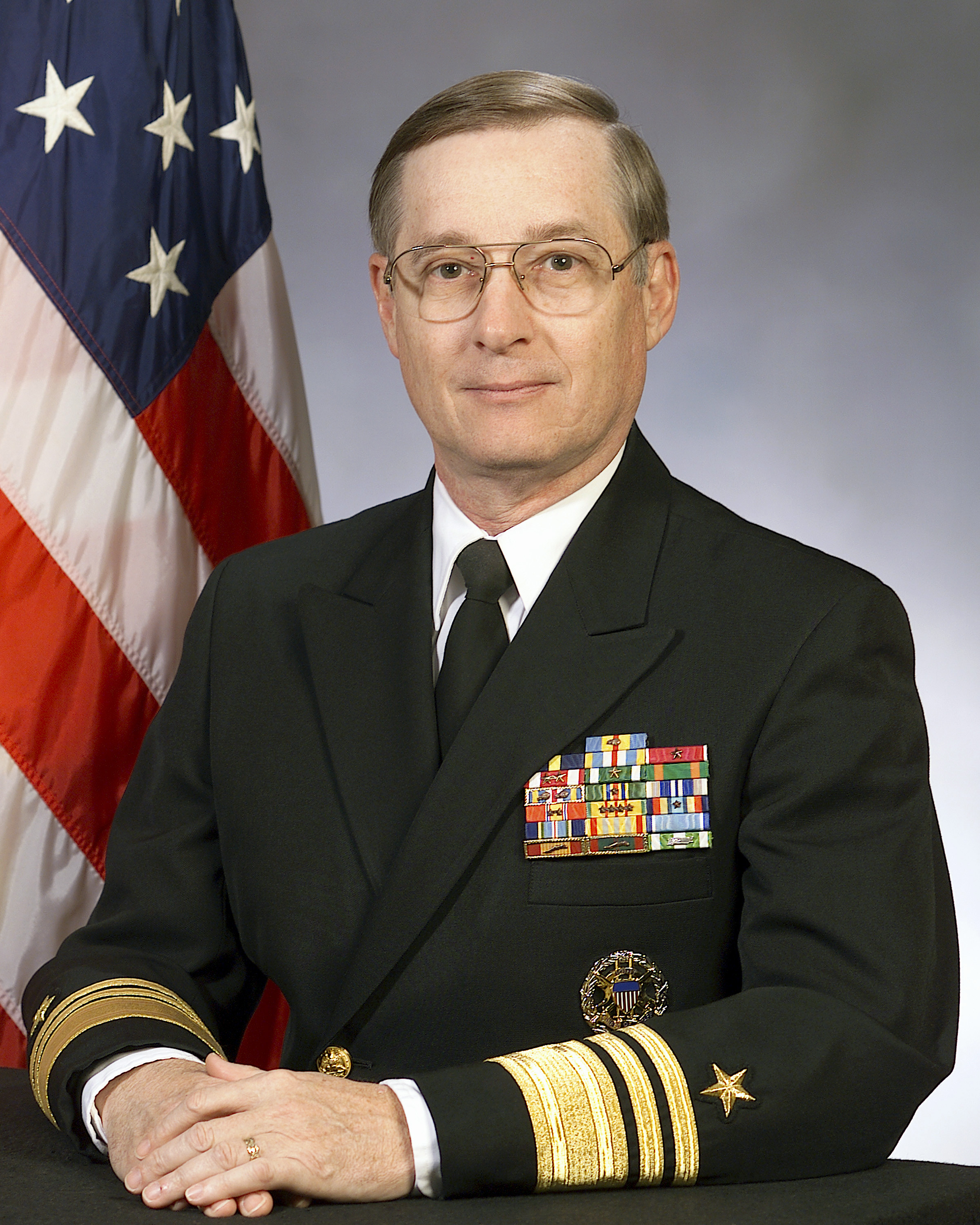
- Jacoby in the 2000s
- Born: Lowell Edwin Jacoby; 28 August 1945 (age 81); Lancaster, Pennsylvania, U.S.
- Military career
- Allegiance: USA
- Branch: United States Navy
- Service years: 1969–2005
- Rank: Vice Admiral
- Commands: Director, Defense Intelligence Agency; Commander, Office of Naval Intelligence; Commander, Joint Intelligence Center Pacific
- Conflicts: Vietnam War; Cold War
- Awards: Defense Distinguished Service Medal (3); Distinguished Service Medal (Navy); Defense Superior Service Medal; Legion of Merit (2); National Intelligence Distinguished Service Medal; National Intelligence Medal of Achievement

Vice Admiral Lowell Edwin Jacoby, USN (born 28 August 1945) was the 14th Director of the Defense Intelligence Agency. Previously he was Director for Intelligence (J-2) Joint Staff in the Office of the Chairman of the Joint Chiefs of Staff from 1999 to 2002, and the Director of Naval Intelligence and Commander, Office of Naval Intelligence from 1997 to 1999. He was the Director for Intelligence, U.S. Pacific Command from 1994 to 1997 and Commander, Joint Intelligence Center, Pacific from 1992 to 1994. He was Assistant Chief of Staff, Intelligence, U.S. Pacific Fleet from 1990 to 1992.

== Early life ==
Jacoby was born on 28 August 1945, in Lancaster, Pennsylvania. His family moved to Kennett Square, Pennsylvania, before spending a year in Storrs, Connecticut, where his father pursued his doctorate at the University of Connecticut. The family relocated to Manchester, Connecticut, where he attended Grades 3 through his sophomore year in high school. The family moved to Silver Spring, Maryland, where he completed high school at Sherwood High School in Sandy Spring, Maryland, in 1963.

== Education ==
He attended the University of Maryland and received a Bachelor of Arts (Honors) in 1967 with a Major in Economics and a Minor in Government and Politics. He attended the University of Virginia School of Law for one year prior to joining the Navy. From 1975 to 1977 he attended the Naval Postgraduate School in Monterey, California, receiving a Master of Arts in National Security Affairs (With Distinction).

His military education and training includes pre-commissioning and basic Naval Flight Officer training at Naval Air Basic Training Command, NAS Pensacola and intelligence training at the Armed Forces Air Intelligence Training Center, Lowry AFB, Colorado. He attended the Flag and General Officer CAPSTONE course in 1994.

== Career ==
Jacoby began his active duty Navy career on 7 January 1969, when he began Officer Candidate training at Aviation Officer Candidate School at NAS Pensacola, Florida. He was commissioned as an intelligence officer on 16 May 1969, and subsequently stayed at NAS Pensacola as a student at the Naval Air Basic Training Command through August of that year. He transferred to Armed Forces Air Intelligence Training Center, Lowry AFB, Colorado, for basic intelligence training and graduated in March 1970.

His first operational assignment was as Air Intelligence Officer with Fighter Squadron 24 flying F-8 Crusader aircraft off USS Hancock (CV-19) as part of Carrier Air Wing 21. His assignment to VF-24 from March 1970 to May 1971 included a combat deployment to Vietnam from October 1970 to May 1971. Immediately upon arrival on Yankee Station in the South China Sea, his air wing was involved in air operations to support the Son Tay raid into North Vietnam to attempt to rescue American Prisoners of War. Subsequent operations focused on interdiction of supplies flowing into South Vietnam over the Ho Chi Minh Trail in Laos.

Jacoby volunteered for duty in Saigon, Vietnam and joined Commander Seventh Fleet Detachment Charlie in June 1971 as the air intelligence officer. This small Navy detachment was charged with coordinating Seventh Fleet carrier operations with the Seventh Air Force Headquarters at Tan Son Nhut Air Base in Saigon for the conduct of the air war in Southeast Asia. This detachment was subsequently re-subordinated to Commander-In-Chief, U.S. Pacific Fleet as Chief, Fleet Coordinating Group, Saigon to coordinate all Navy operations with the Commander, Military Assistance Command Vietnam (MACV). he was involved in coordinating the response to the 1972 North Vietnamese offensive that prompted the simultaneous deployment of six Aircraft Carrier Task Forces to the South China Sea, the mining of Haiphong and other North Vietnam harbors and the run-up to the Christmas B-52 bombing campaign in North Vietnam that punctuated peace negotiations. Vice Admiral Jacoby departed Saigon in December 1972 at the end of an 18-month tour of duty.

In January 1973, he reported for duty with Naval Intelligence Command Headquarters and was assigned as a Chief of Naval Operations Intelligence Plot watch officer and Chief of Naval Operations briefing officer. During a tour of duty that extended to August 1975, he was a briefer during the 1973 Arab/Israeli War and subsequent stand-off between U.S. Navy and Soviet Navy forces in the Eastern Mediterranean, the Cyprus conflict between Greece and Turkey, the Soviet Union's largest worldwide naval exercise (Okean 75), the return of our U.S. Prisoners of War from South East Asia and the fall of the governments in Cambodia and Vietnam.

After completing his master's degree program at the Naval Postgraduate School in March 1977, he reported to the Commander, Second Fleet and Striking Fleet Atlantic as the Operational Intelligence Officer. He was promoted to lieutenant commander in July 1978. From August 1979 to August 1981, he served as the assistant head, Intelligence Assignment and Placement Branch at the Naval Military Personnel Command, where he was responsible for assigning junior intelligence officers and filling intelligence officer positions throughout the Navy and in Joint Commands. His next assignment was with the Navy Field Operational Intelligence Office in Suitland, Maryland, as head, Naval Operations Branch and as director, Naval Ocean Surveillance Information Center. Following a short period as administrative assistant to the Director of Naval Intelligence, he reported as head, Chief of Naval Operations Intelligence Plot and served in this position until August 1985. He was promoted to commander in October 1983.

Jacoby reported for duty as Assistant Chief of Staff, Intelligence on the staff of Commander Carrier Group Eight home ported in Norfolk, Virginia, and made a deployment to the Mediterranean aboard USS Nimitz and USS John F. Kennedy from December 1986 to June 1987. Upon the staff's return to Norfolk, he reported to Commander, Second Fleet as Assistant Chief of Staff, Intelligence. During this tour he was heavily involved in developing new Joint war fighting doctrine and procedures, refining U.S. Navy forward deployment strategies against the Soviet Union and preparing battle groups for deployment. He made three deployments to the northern Norwegian Sea aboard USS South Carolina and USS Mount Whitney to test and evaluate Navy war fighting doctrine. In addition, the staff was in the vicinity of the Yankee SSBN and the Mike-class submarine when those submarines were lost in the Atlantic. He was also embarked in USS Iowa when the Turret Two main battery exploded with significant loss of life and the resultant decommissioning of the battleship.

In July 1989 Jacoby returned to Washington as the head of the Intelligence Assignment and Placement Branch at the Naval Military Personnel Command. He was promoted to captain in September 1989. In January 1990 he was selected for an early rotation and assignment as Assistant Chief of Staff for Intelligence on the staff of Commander, U.S. Pacific Fleet at Pearl Harbor, Hawaii. During this assignment he conceptualized and gained concurrence for the merger of three intelligence centers on Oahu that served CINCPAC, CINCPACFLT and PACAF in to single Joint Intelligence Center. This Joint Intelligence Center, Pacific (JICPAC) became the model for joint centers in the European and Central Commands. Additionally, he was in this position during Operations Desert Shield and Desert Storm as the Pacific Fleet supported forward deployed operations.

In August 1992, Jacoby became the second commander of the Joint Intelligence Center, Pacific. In December 1993 he was selected for promotion to rear admiral and following attendance at the CAPSTONE course, he assumed his duties as Director for Intelligence (J2), on the staff of Commander, U.S. Pacific Command. From July 1994 to February 1996 he served as a frocked rear admiral (lower half) and was promoted to that rank on 1 February 1996. His tenure saw further refinement of Joint operations and concepts in response to Goldwater-Nichols legislation, new deployment and operational concept development, a series of crises promoted by North Korea, growth of Chinese military capabilities to include missile firings and provocative operations in the vicinity of Taiwan and many changes in relationships with Pacific Rim nations as part of an aggressive engagement strategy.

From May 1997 to November 1997, Jacoby was assigned to the Chief of Naval Operations in a temporary duty status. In October 1997 he was promoted to rear admiral, and in November he assumed duties as Director of Naval Intelligence and Commander, Office of Naval Intelligence.

In July 1999, Jacoby was assigned as director for intelligence (J2) on the Joint Staff. His tenure began with leading the intelligence lessons learned effort to examine the operations in the Balkans and Kosovo. Operations Northern and Southern Watch continued to enforce No-Fly Zones and sanctions against Iraq. In addition, the U.S. Navy EP-3 reconnaissance aircraft was impounded by the Chinese on Hainan Island following a collision with a Chinese fighter during operations over the South China Sea and the attack on USS Cole took place in Aden, Yemen. This latter event prompted a fundamental change in approach to terrorism analysis and support to operating forces which was embodied in the proposed Joint Intelligence Task Force, Combating Terrorism (JITF-CT) operating under the guidance of the Joint Staff J-2 as part of the Defense Intelligence Agency. Jacoby was advocating increased funding for JITF-CT on the afternoon of 10 September 2001, with senior staff on the House Permanent Select Committee on Intelligence. He was in the Pentagon when it was attacked on 11 September 2001. He led the stand-up of JITF-CT, was active in intelligence planning for the Global War on Terrorism and military operations in Afghanistan, oversaw J-2 activities during the initial phase of combat operations in Afghanistan and was instrumental in developing and championing an operational concept called "2 Plus 7" which became the center point for U.S. operations to dismantle the Al-Qaeda organization and attack its centralized leadership and planning functions. The effort focused operations against the two leaders and the seven senior operational planners. The result was a significant degradation in the organization's capabilities. Jacoby concluded his one-year extension as Joint Staff J-2 in July 2002.

In July 2002, Jacoby became the acting director of the Defense Intelligence Agency and served in that capacity until being promoted to vice admiral and assuming the duties as Director, Defense Intelligence Agency on 17 October 2002. He relinquished the directorship in November 2005 and retired on January 1, 2006, concluding a 37-year Navy career.

During his tenure as Director of DIA, Jacoby initiated a dramatic improvement in the way the agency collected, shared and used the information its many components generated. In his statement to the Joint Congressional 9/11 Inquiry in October, 2002, then newly DIA Director, Jacoby stated, "We must move toward a common data framework and set of standards and will allow interoperability at the data, not system, level." This seemingly innocuous statement, far afield from many similar efforts in the federal government, set DIA on a course toward the interoperability it needed, focusing on the information elements themselves, and avoiding the organizational resistance normally generated by technology mandates.

He was saying, in effect, "we don’t care how you do it, but create and share intelligence content in a common format." Under Jacoby, DIA identified XML as the standard syntax for that common format, and chartered a working group to design and maintain its XML standard, initially known as the IC-Metadata System for Publications (IC-MSP; later subsumed in the Implementation Profile for Intelligence Publications or PUBS-XML). In the public sector where success in multi-organizational information sharing efforts has been rare, DIA succeeded, resulting in the 2007 opening of the Library of National Intelligence, growing at more than 20,000 XML documents per week. DIA's efforts and Jacoby's foresight hold important lessons for all public sector organizations facing similar challenges.

Since leaving the Navy, Jacoby has continued to serve the intelligence community in the private sector as a senior executive for a large defense contractor; he lives and works in the Washington, D.C., area.

== Awards, decorations and badges ==
Foreign awards and recognition include the Australian Chief of Defense Force Commendation, the Medal of the Military Intelligence Service of the Slovak Republic II Class and the Order of the Star of Romania in the rank of commander (with military insignia).

U.S. and foreign military decorations
Defense Distinguished Service Medal (with 2 oak leaf clusters)
Distinguished Service Medal (U.S. Navy)
Defense Superior Service Medal
Legion of Merit (with gold star)
Meritorious Service Medal (with two gold stars)
Navy - Marine Corps Commendation Medal (with gold star)
Navy - Marine Corps Achievement Medal
National Defense Service Medal with two service stars
Armed Forces Expeditionary Medal
Vietnam Service Medal (with four stars)
Global War on Terrorism Service Medal
Sea Service Deployment Ribbon (with bronze star)
U.S. Coast Guard Special Operations Service Ribbon
Vietnam Armed Forces Honor Medal, 1st class
Air Service Medal, Honor Class
Military Order of the Star of Romania, Commander
Vietnam Campaign Medal
Unit awards
Joint Meritorious Unit Award (four awards)
Navy Meritorious Unit Commendation with 1 service star
Vietnam Gallantry Cross Unit Citation
Vietnam Civil Actions Unit Citation
National non-military awards
National Intelligence Distinguished Service Medal
National Intelligence Medal of Achievement
Badges
Office of the Joint Chiefs of Staff Identification Badge
Defense Intelligence Agency Badge
