= USS Williamson =

Tender of the United States Navy

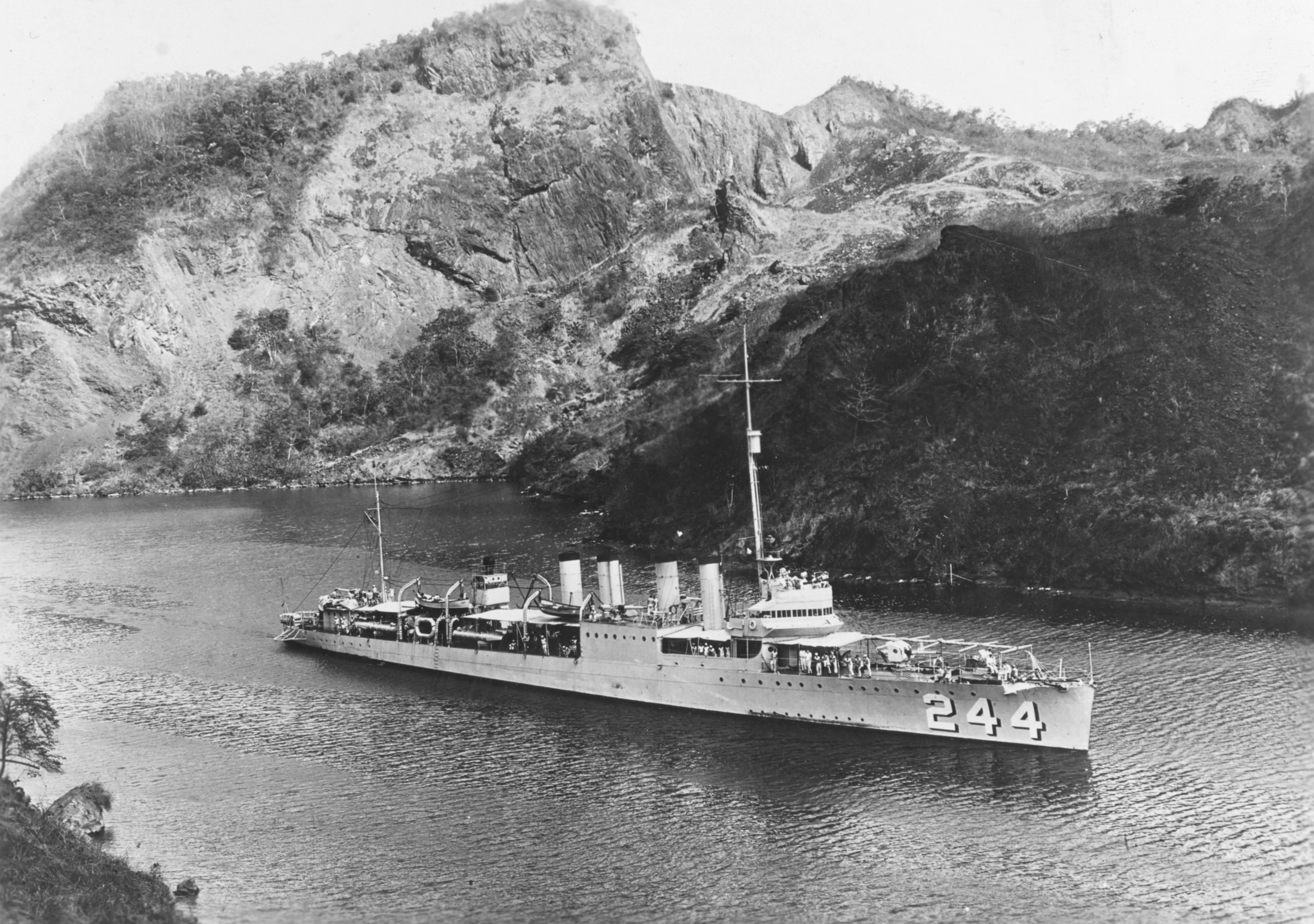

History

United States
- Namesake: William Price Williamson
- Builder: New York Shipbuilding
- Laid down: 27 March 1919
- Launched: 16 October 1919
- Commissioned: 29 October 1920
- Decommissioned: 8 November 1945
- Stricken: 19 December 1945
- Fate: Sold for scrap, 30 October 1946

General characteristics
- Class & type: Clemson-class destroyer
- Displacement: 1,190 tons
- Length: 314 ft 4 in (95.81 m)
- Beam: 30 ft 8 in (9.35 m)
- Draft: 9 ft 3 in (2.82 m)
- Propulsion: 26,500 shp (20 MW); geared turbines, 2 screws
- Speed: 35 knots (65 km/h)
- Range: 4,900 nm @ 15 kn (9,100 km @ 28 km/h)
- Complement: 122 officers and enlisted
- Armament: 4 x 4 in (100 mm) guns, 1 x 3 in (76 mm) gun, 12 x 21-inch (533 mm) tt.

USS Williamson (DD-244/AVP-15/AVD-2/APD-27) was a Clemson-class destroyer in the United States Navy during World War II. She was named for Commander William Price Williamson.

Williamson was laid down on 27 March 1919 and launched on 16 October 1919 by the New York Shipbuilding Corporation, sponsored by Commander Williamson's widow, reclassified from Destroyer No. 244 to DD-244 in the Navy's fleet-wide assignment of alphanumeric hull numbers on 17 July 1920, and commissioned at the Philadelphia Navy Yard on 29 October 1920.

== Service history ==
=== 1920s ===
The new destroyer was partially fitted out at Philadelphia into mid-December. After calibrating compasses in Delaware Bay, she received the remainder of her torpedo equipment at the Naval Torpedo Station, Newport, Rhode Island, before her fitting-out was completed at the New York Navy Yard.

Williamson departed New York on 3 January 1921, bound for Europe and, after proceeding via Bermuda, arrived at Brest, France, in company with Sands, on 16 February. She remained in French and British waters - calling at Cherbourg, France; and Gravesend and Portsmouth, England - into the spring before sailing for the eastern Mediterranean on 23 May.

Assigned to U.S. Naval Forces in Turkish waters, Williamson arrived at Ineboli (now Inebolu), Turkey, on 22 June. There, she landed passengers and investigated local political conditions. At intervals in the ensuing months, Williamson made cruises from Constantinople to Odessa, Russia; Ghelenjik Bay; Novorossiysk; and Theodosia, before returning to Constantinople. She made another cruise to Odessa on 22 June 1922, delivering passengers and serving for a time as station ship there. On 2 July, the destroyer departed that port, bound for Constantinople, and transferred stores en route to her relief, Bulmer. Six days later, Williamson headed for Gibraltar on her way to the United States and arrived back at Philadelphia on 27 July.

After joining the Atlantic Fleet at Hampton Roads, on 6 September, Williamson shifted to New York for exercises and gunnery drills before she returned to Hampton Roads on 28 September for further exercises off the Virginia Capes in the Southern Drill Grounds. The destroyer operated off the eastern seaboard and at Guantánamo Bay, Cuba, participating in war games and routine battle practices into early 1923. She returned to the New York area in November of that year, engaging, at intervals, in more rehearsals and gunnery drills. She departed New York on 6 May 1924 for maneuvers with the Scouting Fleet.

After returning to New York for voyage repairs, the destroyer sailed for the Southern Drill Grounds on 19 May and arrived at Hampton Roads on the 28th to conduct depth charge practices before she returned to Newport, Rhode Island, to take part in high speed target and torpedo practice at the Naval Torpedo Station. Later, Williamson participated in the search for a life boat missing from the steamer Boston and made a cruise to Guantanamo Bay in company with King, McFarland, and James K. Paulding before returning to New York on 8 December.

Over the next few years, Williamson's routine remained fairly standard for vessels of her type in active service. She cruised off the east coast of the United States and into the Caribbean, operating at intervals out of Guantanamo Bay during the annual Fleet concentrations there. However, there were breaks in this routine. Although Williamson operated primarily with Destroyer Squadrons, Scouting Force, she spent a brief period in January and February 1927 in the Special Service Squadron operating off the east coast of Nicaragua during an outbreak of revolutionary violence.

After returning to the New York Navy Yard on 30 June 1927, Williamson trained Naval Reserve units off the eastern seaboard.

In 1928 it arrived in Havana harbour, as escort for USS Texas which had President Coolidge aboard as he was going to attend the Pan-American conference.

Overhauled in the spring of 1928, the destroyer conducted additional reserve training cruises into 1930. Highlights in the ship's activities during that time were plane-guarding for Lexington in Guantanamo Bay in May 1930 and an extended reserve cruise that took her to Mayport, Florida, the Dry Tortugas, Key West, and Rebecca Shoals and Havana, Cuba.

=== 1930s ===
Williamson continued operating off the East Coast into mid-1931 as part of Destroyer Division 9, Flotilla 1, Scouting Force, before she shifted to San Diego, California, in March 1932, to operate briefly off the West Coast in the spring before returning to the East Coast. Upon reaching Norfolk, Virginia on 17 December 1932, Williamson was placed in rotating reserve. She subsequently sailed on 1 July 1933 bound, via the Panama Canal Zone, for the West Coast; arriving at San Diego on 21 July, the ship plane-guarded for Saratoga during the summer.

Williamson returned to the East Coast in the spring of the following year and, in July 1934, was one of the escorts for Houston while President Franklin D. Roosevelt was embarked in that heavy cruiser. The destroyer subsequently proceeded to the Washington Navy Yard on 19 July 1934. There, she received an early sonar installation before sailing for the West Coast, returning to San Diego in November. She later underwent a rotating reserve overhaul in the summer of 1935 before joining Destroyer Squadron 3.

That summer, Williamson cruised to Alaska and, operating from Auke Bay, visited Portage Cove, Skagway, and Juneau, while patrolling coastal waters between 20 July and 31 July. Returning to San Diego on 9 August, Williamson conducted battle problems and local operations from that port with the other ships in her division into 1936.

Sailing for Balboa on 9 May 1936 to participate in Fleet Problem XVII in June, Williamson later underwent an overhaul at the Norfolk Navy Yard. She subsequently operated in the Gulf of Mexico and proceeded thence via Mobile, Alabama, and the Panama Canal to San Diego, where she arrived on 30 October 1936.

Williamson conducted local operations out of that port into the winter and plane-guarded for Ranger in February 1937, before shifting to Hawaiian waters in the spring. Arriving at Pearl Harbor on 25 April, Williamson operated in the Hawaiian Islands with other units of the Destroyer Force of the United States Fleet until she returned to the West Coast in June. She operated off the West Coast for the remainder of 1937 and returned to Pearl Harbor in January 1938 for an overhaul in the navy yard there. She then took part in Fleet Problem XIX and, upon the conclusion of those exercises, returned to San Diego on 28 April 1938. She then shifted to the East Coast, arriving at Philadelphia on 2 June for conversion to a new and special type of auxiliary vessel.

With the increase in patrol plane forces in the Navy at that time, there arose in the Fleet's air wings an urgent need for tenders to support such aircraft. Accordingly, two flush-deck Clemson-class destroyers were chosen for conversion to light seaplane tenders: Williamson and Childs.

As the conversion work proceeded into the autumn, all torpedo gear was removed from both ships, as were two of each ship's 4-inch guns, the 3-inch antiaircraft gun, their depth charge tracks, and the forward two boilers. Additional deckhouse space was added forward. Internal arrangements were changed to accommodate the personnel of a 12-plane patrol plane (VP) squadron and a supply of aviation gasoline. A boat derrick was added to the existing searchlight tower structure to handle a pair of 30-foot motor launches to be used for tending the planes in the water. The ship retained her forward and aftermost 4-inch guns, and four .50-caliber machine guns were added for antiaircraft defense.

As experimental vessels, Williamson and Childs – simultaneously reclassified on 1 July 1938 to AVP-15 and AVP-14, respectively – would soon prove successful. And, although more ships of their type were added to the Fleet prior to World War II, Williamson and Childs were the trailblazers.

On the last day of 1938, the conversion was complete. Painted pale gray and wearing the hull number "15" and displaying the red-centered blue and white star which indicated her aviation affiliation, Williamson departed Philadelphia on 3 January 1939, bound for Norfolk. There she took on board men and material from Patrol Wing (PatWing) 5 and soon headed for the Florida Keys where she provided tender services to VP-15 before returning to Philadelphia on 11 March 1939 for a post-shakedown availability.

After shifting briefly to Newport, Williamson sailed for the West Coast on 21 April. Proceeding via San Diego, the light seaplane tender made port at Seattle, Washington, and reported to Commander, PatWing 4 for temporary duty. She operated off the California coast from 26 May to 23 August before shifting to Kodiak, Alaska, to service two patrol squadrons, VP-41 and VP-42.

While Williamson was tending PBY Catalinas in the Pacific Northwest, war broke out in Europe on 1 September 1939, when Germany invaded Poland.

That autumn, Williamson operated out of Seattle and shifted to the Puget Sound Navy Yard on 5 February 1940 for an overhaul. She got underway for the Hawaiian Islands on 5 April and participated in Fleet Problem XXI before returning to Seattle on 21 May for a period of local operations and upkeep at Naval Air Station (NAS) Seattle. That summer, on 2 August 1940, she was again re-classified—this time as AVD-2.

On 4 March 1941, Williamson recovered three crew of a Douglas TBD-1 Devastator which ditched after engine failure, ~5 miles W of Mission Beach, California. The aviators successfully deployed a dinghy and were rescued after ~30 minutes by Williamson. This rare TBD was rediscovered in 1996, and in February 2011, the National Museum of Naval Aviation at NAS Pensacola, Florida, announced plans to recover and restore the rara avis.

Before the entry of the United States into the war in December 1941, Williamson spent the last of her peacetime months engaged in valuable survey work between Acapulco, Mexico, and the Aleutian Islands. In the summer of 1941, the seaplane tenders and planes of PatWing 4, under the direction of Rear Admiral John S. McCain – later to become the famed task force commander – conducted an intensive survey of possible advance seaplane base sites in the Aleutians and along the Alaskan peninsula work that paid dividends within a year.

=== World War II ===
7 December 1941, found Williamson under overhaul at the Puget Sound Navy Yard. After temporary duty with Destroyer Squadron (DesRon) 82, she helped to escort Maryland into the Puget Sound Navy Yard on 30 December. The tender completed her repairs and took on stores in January 1942 and then shifted to the Aleutians to resume her duties as a tender for the PBY's of PatWing 4.

==== 1942 ====
During the early wartime period, the ship performed local escort missions and delivered war materials to Army and Navy bases at Cold Bay, Seattle, Dutch Harbor, and Kodiak. Williamson and her sister tenders also stocked emergency seaplane bases with vital necessities: buoys, gasoline, lubricating oil, ammunition, and bombs. Those temporary sites provided shelter for PBY's forced down by weather and proved valuable as alternate bases dispersed well enough to prevent a complete disaster if the Japanese attacked the established base sites. In addition, Williamson rescued and salvaged PBY's closed out of their havens by the "notorious Alaskan fog."

On 20 May, prior to the Japanese invasion of the Aleutians, Williamson rescued Brigadier General Simon Bolivar Buckner from Kiska, when the general and his party were stranded there by 60-knot winds that prevented seaplanes from taking off after completing an inspection tour of the Near and Rat Island groups.

Early in June 1942, when the Japanese occupied Kiska and Attu in the Aleutians, as a diversion from the major Japanese thrust directed at the key atoll of Midway in the Central Pacific, Williamson lay at Umnak Pass, near the newly established Army airstrip there - the westernmost field in the Aleutian chain. Two Japanese planes from one of the carriers supporting the operation (either Ryūjō or Junyō) strafed the ship and wounded six men. Fortunately, there were no fatalities.

Williamson, in company with Casco, later set up an advanced seaplane base at Chernofski and supported the PBY squadron assigned the mission of bombing the Japanese troops on Kiska Island until Army planes could take over the task. On 23 June, after having established the advanced site, the destroyer-seaplane tender left the Aleutians and steamed to Seattle for badly needed repairs.

After returning to Dutch Harbor in August, she proceeded to sea on the 25th to attempt the rescue and salvage of a PBY down at sea in extremely rough weather. During the operation, Williamson was attempting to take the damaged Catalina in tow when a wave threw the PBY against one of the tender's propeller guards. The shock of the collision dislodged a pair of depth charges from the plane's wing shackles, and the resultant explosion wounded 16 men and blew one man over the side into the water. Efficient damage control, however, managed to localize the flooding aft, where the most severe damage was located. All hands bailed out the flooded spaces by an old-fashioned, but effective, method - the "bucket brigade."

While returning to Dutch Harbor, Williamson was shadowed by a Japanese patrol plane but made port without further incident. There, Seabees reinforced the damaged hull with "I" beams taken from a dismantled hangar. This enabled Williamson to creep back to Seattle on one engine at nine knots via Kodiak, Yakutat, and the scenic Alaskan Inside Passage.

==== 1943 ====
By the time Williamson's repairs had been completed, newer, more modern AVP's were entering the Fleet, and the need for Williamson's tending planes was lessening considerably. She was accordingly reclassified APD-27 and, on 3 January 1943, was ordered to support the shakedown training of escort carriers. Williamson served as plane guard and escort for carriers operating in the Puget Sound and San Diego operating areas. Those carriers included Core, Card, Long Island, Barnes, Nassau, Altamaha, Breton, Copahee, Casablanca, Corregidor, Anzio, Tripoli, and Natoma Bay. During that time, Williamson picked 14 men from the water after accidental crashes.

Relieved from that shakedown duty in the spring of 1943, Williamson supported the invasion and occupation of Kiska and Attu in April and May 1943. On 15 May 1943, four torpedo wakes passed close to the ship, her closest call of the campaign and, indeed, her last brush with the Japanese in the Aleutian theater.

Returning to San Diego late in the spring of 1943, Williamson briefly trained with submarines and then resumed escorting and plane-guarding for carriers on their shakedown cruises. On 1 December 1943, Williamson was reclassified back to her original classification: DD-244.

After repairs at the Mare Island Navy Yard in January 1944, Williamson sailed for the Hawaiian Islands on 24 January, arriving six days later. The destroyer departed Pearl Harbor on 7 February, bound for the South Pacific. She proceeded via American Samoa to Espiritu Santo and performed escort duties between Guadalcanal and Funafuti, in the Ellice Islands, until early April, when she joined Task Unit (TU) 34.6.4 for screening operations in the New Guinea area. Refueling areas included those between Truk, New Ireland, and the Admiralty Islands.

Upon completion of that assignment, Williamson proceeded to Purvis Bay, Solomon Islands, where she reported to Commander, Group 3, 5th Amphibious Force (Rear Admiral Richard L. Conolly), on 7 May 1944. At that time, the erstwhile seaplane tender was again chosen for special duty.

Gear was installed for underway fueling of scout observation planes from battleships and cruisers to enable the planes to spot gunfire for their parent ships without having to be recovered by them. Rehearsals in the Guadalcanal area proved that Williamson's new rig was suitable for fueling OS2U Kingfisher and SOC Seagull scout planes. With her new equipment thus tested, Williamson departed for Kwajalein, the final staging point for the Marianas operation, on 1 June. Nine days later, on the 10th, the destroyer got underway for the first operational test of the underway refueling concept which had been developed by Rear Admiral Walden L. Ainsworth.

Upon her arrival at Saipan on 14 June, Williamson reported for duty to Admiral Ainsworth (Commander, Bombardment and Gunfire Support Force) and commenced refueling scout planes. Williamson's service enabled the ships on the bombardment lines to conduct almost uninterrupted gunfire support for the landings then in progress. On the 16th, she took up her duties fueling the spotter planes of the ships bombarding Japanese positions on Guam.

Williamson soon returned to Saipan, however, as the approach of a Japanese Fleet made a consolidation of American forces desirable. The ensuing Battle of the Philippine Sea resulted in the withdrawal of the enemy force and freed the Americans to resume operations in the Marianas. On 17 June, while conducting screening duties, Williamson rescued a Japanese merchant seaman from the water two days after his ship had been sunk. After giving him a bath, medical attention, and food, Williamson transferred the man to Indianapolis.

The destroyer departed Saipan on 25 June and arrived at Eniwetok on 3 July. Six days later, Williamson sailed once more for Guam and in ensuing days again operated as refueling unit for spotter planes during the invasion and occupation of Guam. Once the landings had been made, Williamson acted as a terminal vessel for mail and passenger seaplanes arriving from Eniwetok, until 16 August. During the Guam operation, Williamson had a brush with the Japanese when a shore battery near the town of Agat, on the west coast of the island, opened fire. However, as the ship's commanding officer reported, "getting underway and opening the range solved this problem."

Williamson departed Guam on 16 August and proceeded to Pearl Harbor, escorting a convoy. She was overhauled at the Pearl Harbor Navy Yard before she operated as plane guard and carrier escort for Carrier Division 11. From the autumn of 1944 until 8 January 1945, the destroyer provided escort and plane guard services for Ranger, Saratoga, Bataan, Corregidor, and Makassar Strait. During that time, Williamson rescued seven men while on plane guard station.

==== 1945 ====
On 10 January, Williamson joined the 5th Fleet and sortied from Pearl Harbor, bound for the Carolines. After upkeep at Ulithi, Williamson took part in rehearsal operations at Saipan and Tinian for the impending invasion of Iwo Jima the target in the island-hopping campaign.

Upon completion of those practice exercises in the Marianas, the Iwo Jima-bound task forces headed for their objective. Again, as at Saipan and Guam, Williamson performed her unique services for the bombardment phase of the Iwo Jima operation. In addition, she rescued the survivors of two carrier planes which had ditched nearby; provided medical and damage control assistance to a badly damaged LCI; rescued an LCM that had drifted 20 miles from Iwo Jima; kept watch on a damaged PBM Mariner (carrying members of the press) until the arrival of a seaplane tender group; and transferred one of her own crew to Nevada for an emergency appendectomy.

With the completion of the bombardment phase on 26 February, Williamson headed for Saipan with a number of damaged landing craft. On some days making a "speed of advance" of only three knots to allow the landing craft to keep up, the destroyer ultimately reached her destination, where she parted company with the landing craft and proceeded independently to Ulithi where she prepared for the invasion of Okinawa.

Reaching Okinawa on 25 March, Williamson operated as an antisubmarine screening vessel and spotting plane refueling unit with Fire Support Group 1. On the 28th, the destroyer rescued a fighter pilot whose aircraft had been damaged by antiaircraft fire and forced to ditch nearby. Once the invasion forces went ashore on 1 April, Williamson joined the Seaplane Base Unit in Kerama Retto and refueled ship-based, patrol, and transport float and seaplanes, as well as furnished aviation gasoline to battleship and cruiser aviation units.

After three weeks in the forward area, during which time frequent air raid alerts became the routine, Williamson departed the Ryūkyūs and returned to Guam. She acted as a plane guard and an escort for carriers training in the Marianas. During that period, she made one escort trip to Ulithi and one to Leyte and Samar and provided her services to Hoggatt Bay, Nehenta Bay, White Plains, Manila Bay, Velio, Vella Gulf, Makin Island, Makassar Strait, and Casablanca. While on plane guard station, she rescued three downed aviators.

After operating in that capacity through the cessation of hostilities with Japan in mid-August 1945, Williamson headed via Pearl Harbor for the West Coast and arrived at San Diego on 25 September 1945. She transited the Panama Canal on 10 and 11 October and reached Philadelphia on the 16th. Decommissioned on 8 November 1945, the veteran destroyer was struck from the Navy List on 19 December 1945.

Sold through the Navy Disposal Agency on 17 October 1946, her hulk was acquired by the North American Smelting Company, and removed from Navy custody on 30 October 1946. She was scrapped shortly thereafter.

== Awards ==
Williamson earned four battle stars for her World War II service.

As of 2012, no other ship has been named Williamson.
