= David Gompert =

American government official and former diplomat

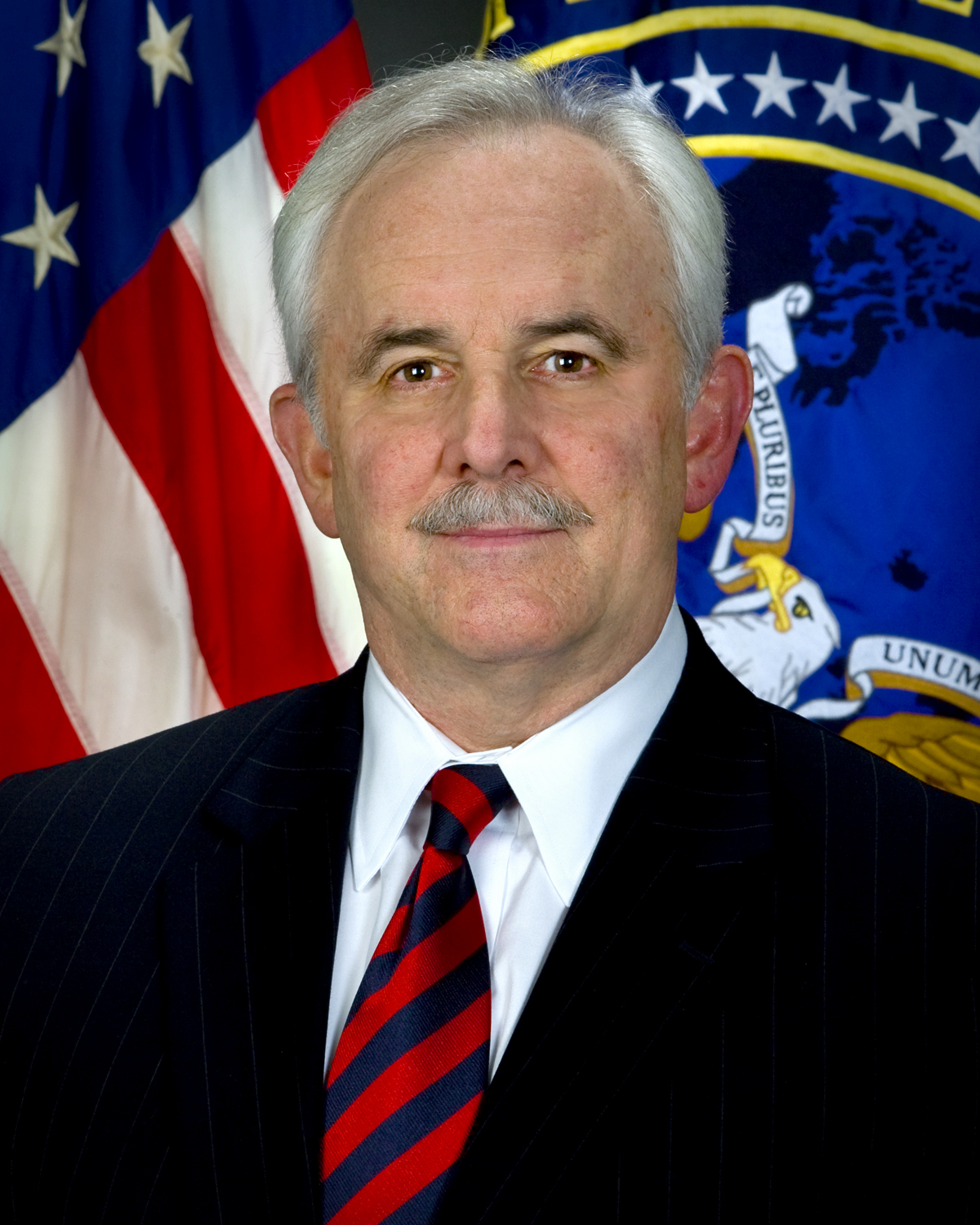

Director of National Intelligence
- Acting
- In office May 28, 2010 – August 5, 2010
- President: Barack Obama
- Preceded by: Dennis C. Blair
- Succeeded by: James Clapper

3rd Principal Deputy Director of National Intelligence
- In office November 10, 2009 – February 11, 2011
- President: Barack Obama
- Preceded by: Donald Kerr
- Succeeded by: Stephanie O'Sullivan

Personal details
- Born: David Charles Gompert; October 6, 1945
- Died: August 21, 2024 (aged 78)
- Education: United States Naval Academy (BS); Princeton University (MPA)

David Charles Gompert (October 6, 1945 – August 21, 2024) was an American government official and diplomat who served as the acting Director of National Intelligence (DNI) following the resignation of Dennis C. Blair in 2009. Prior to his ascension as DNI, he was Principal Deputy Director of National Intelligence and continued serving in that capacity until 2011.

== Career ==
In between government and academic tenures, Gompert has worked in the private sector. He has worked in senior executive positions at Unisys, AT&T, and most recently as a senior fellow at RAND, a leading research organization that explores topics such as national security, terrorism, economic development, and science and technology. Before that, he was a distinguished research professor at the National Defense University's Center for Technology and National Security Policy.

From 2003 to 2004, Gompert was the senior adviser for national security and defense to the Coalition Provisional Authority in Iraq that followed the deposed Ba'athist regime.

From 1975 to 1983, he held numerous positions at the U.S. Department of State, serving as deputy to the Under Secretary of State for Political Affairs, deputy director of the Bureau of Political-Military Affairs, and special assistant to former Secretary of State Henry Kissinger. Following these capacities in the Ford, Carter, and Reagan administrations, he was appointed Special Assistant to President George H. W. Bush.

Gompert received a bachelor's degree in engineering from the U.S. Naval Academy, where he once served on the faculty, and a Master of Public Affairs from Princeton University's Woodrow Wilson School of Public and International Affairs.

== Notes ==
Government offices
| Preceded by Donald Kerr | Principal Deputy Director of National Intelligence; 2009–2011 | Succeeded by Stephanie O'Sullivan |
| Preceded by Dennis C. Blair | Director of National Intelligence; Acting; 2010 | Succeeded by James Clapper |
