= National Intelligence Distinguished Service Medal =

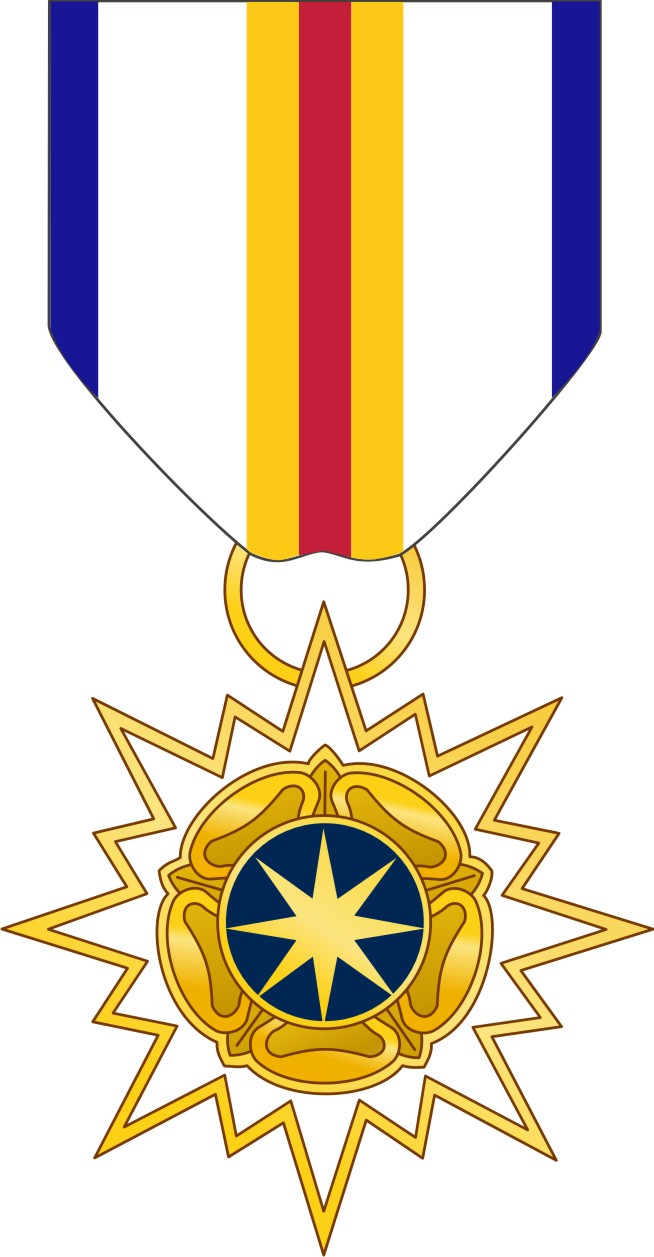
- National Intelligence Distinguished Service Medal
- Type: Military medal Distinguished service medal
- Awarded for: sustained, selfless service of the highest order, and/or extraordinary and long lasting contributions to the Intelligence Community and the United States by an individual in a position of great responsibility.
- Presented by: United States Intelligence Community
- Eligibility: United States Government civilian and military personnel
- Status: Active
- Established: August 15, 1993 (Director of Central Intelligence Directive 7/1); revised May 23, 2007 by ODNI Intelligence Community Directive Number 655
- National Intelligence Distinguished Service Medal ribbon

Precedence
- Next (higher): National Intelligence Medal for Valor
- Equivalent: National Intelligence Distinguished Public Service Medal
- Next (lower): National Intelligence Superior Service Medal

The National Intelligence Distinguished Service Medal (NIDSM) is a decoration awarded for service to the United States Intelligence Community. The decoration is awarded to any member or contributor to the National Intelligence Community, either civilian or military, who distinguishes themselves by meritorious actions to the betterment of national security in the United States of America, through sustained and selfless service of the highest order.

The National Intelligence Distinguished Service Medal was once considered junior to the older National Security Medal. With the establishment of the National Intelligence Awards (NIA) Program by the Office of the Director of National Intelligence (ODNI), the National Intelligence Distinguished Service Medal was the highest decoration in the program. An update to the NIA program added awards and changed precedence, with the NIDSM being succeeded by the Intelligence Community Medal for Valor in the order of precedence.

As an authorized U.S. non-military decoration on U.S. military uniforms, the National Intelligence Distinguished Service Medal is worn after U.S. military unit awards and before U.S. military campaign and service awards.

== Appearance ==
The National Intelligence Distinguished Service Medal is a gold colored medal 1 5/8 inches (41 mm) across. The obverse design consists of a white 16 pointed star surmounted by a gold heraldic rose. In the center of the rose is a dark blue disc bearing an eight pointed compass rose in gold. The reverse bears the words NATIONAL INTELLIGENCE DISTINGUISHED SERVICE, one word on each line, all in gold.

The medal's ribbon, which is from the original, is 1 3/8 inches (35 mm) wide. The ribbon is white with 1/8 inch (3.2 mm) blue stripes at both edges. In the center is a 1/8 inch (3.2 mm) scarlet stripe flanked by 1/8 inch (3.2 mm) yellow stripes.

Symbolically, the heraldic rose is a symbol of secrecy and confidence, referring to the term sub rosa which is Latin for "under the rose." That symbol has traditionally been used to describe something to be kept secret and not repeated elsewhere. Blue represents loyalty, and is taken from the seal of the Office of the Director of National Intelligence. The compass rose in the center of the medal symbolizes the world-wide mission of the organization, while the points of the white star also allude to compass points. The white color represents honesty, truth and optimism.

== Known recipients ==
- James B. Adams, FBI
- Keith B. Alexander, NSA
- Charles E. Allen, CIA, DHS
- Lew Allen, PFIAB
- Jean Bennett, USA
- Daniel E Bergin, Admiral, USN
- Cofer Black, CIA
- Dennis C. Blair, Admiral, USN, USPACOM
- Matthew David Carter, CDR, USCG, NSA
- James R. Clapper, DIA, NGA
- Larry Combest, HPSCI
- Robert Daniel, CIA, HASC
- Michael H. Decker, OSD
- David J. Dorsett, VADM, USN
- Robert E. Drake, NSA
- Sidney D. Drell, PFIAB
- Winford G. Ellis Rear Admiral, USN
- Fritz Ermarth, CIA
- Martin C. Faga, NRO
- Alan A. Foley, CIA
- Robert Gates, CIA
- Louis E. Grever, FBI
- Michael Hagee, General, USMC, CIA
- Jeffrey K. Harris, NRO
- Eric Haseltine, NSA, ODNI
- Richard Haver, ONI
- John J. Hicks, NPIC, CIA
- Frank Barrett Horton III, USAF, CIA
- Sir Angus Houston, AK, AFC, Air Chief Marshal, RAAF
- Patrick M. Hughes DIA, USA
- Robert M. Huffstutler, NPIC, CIA
- Joanne Isham, CIA
- Kevin J. Jacobsen, Brig Gen, USAF, AFOSI
- Lowell E. Jacoby, Admiral, USN, DIA
- James L. Jones, General, USMC
- Richard X. Larkin, United States, DIA
- Meyer "Mike" Levin, NSA
- Roland Lajoie, Major General, USA
- Mark M. Lowenthal, CIA
- L. Roger Mason, Jr., ODNI
- Barbara McNamara, NSA
- John Michael McConnell, Vice Adm, USN, DNI
- Admiral William H. McRaven
- Herbert E. Meyer, CIA
- Richard W. Mies, Admiral, USN
- Kenneth Minihan, LtGen, USAF, DIA, NSA
- John E. Morrison, USAF major general
- Thomas S. Moorman Jr., USAF
- Robert O'Brien, National Security Advisor
- James W. Pardew, JCS/J-2
- Nickolas Piazzola, NSA
- Lisa Porter, IARPA
- Richard Proto, NSA
- John Scott Redd, NCC, USA
- Oliver Revell, NSC
- Michael S. Rinehart, "Jolly Doc", USN
- Warren B. Rudman, PFIAB
- David T. Savignac, NSA
- Steven T. Shanzer, DIA
- Harry E. Soyster, DIA
- Francis X. Taylor, USAF
- Louis W. Tordella, NSA
- Eric Velez-Villar, FBI Executive Assistant Director
- Alan Wade, CIA
- Jeffrey White, DIA
- Scott D. White, CIA Associate Deputy Director, January 2010
- James A. Williams, LtGen, USA, DIA
- Charles "Chuck" Wilson , NSA
- Thomas R. Wilson, DIA
- Bassem Youssef, FBI

== Recipients gallery ==
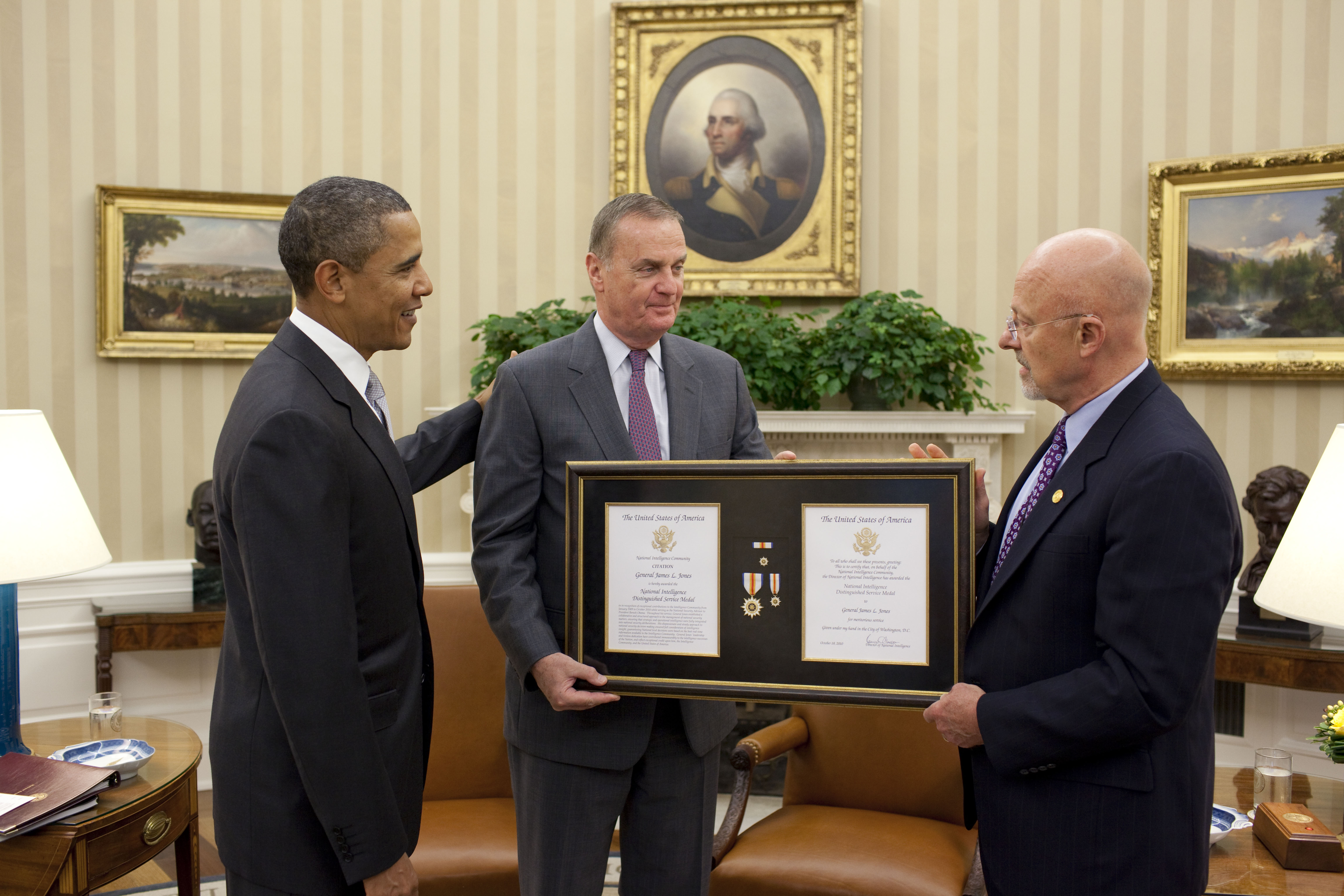
Barack Obama and James R. Clapper presented the National Intelligence Distinguished Service Medal to James L. Jones. (October 20, 2010)

== See also ==
- Distinguished Service Medal (disambiguation)
- Awards and decorations of the United States government
