= Capstone Military Leadership Program =

CAPSTONE
- General and Flag Officer Course
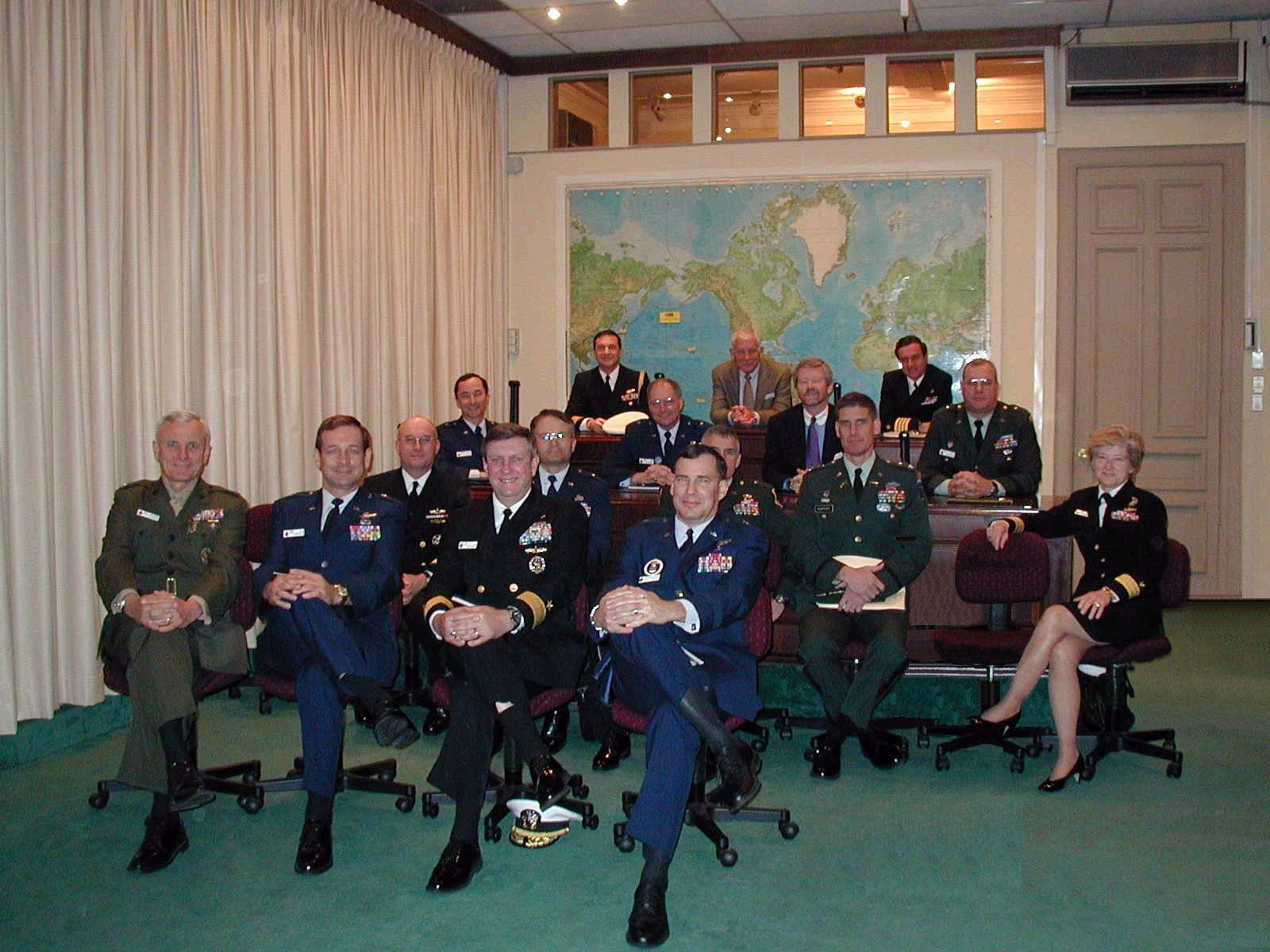
- CAPSTONE class, 2001
- Type: Professional Military Education
- Established: 26 May 1982
- Affiliation: Department of Defense
- Location: Washington, District of Columbia, United States; 38.867°N 77.016°W
- Campus: Fort Lesley J. McNair
- Website: capstone.ndu.edu
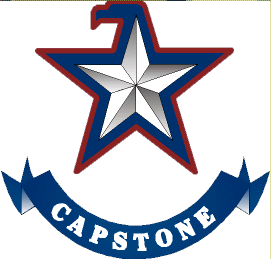

CAPSTONE is a joint service professional military education courses for newly promoted brigadier generals and rear admirals serving in the United States military. The National Defense University conducts the CAPSTONE course at Fort Lesley J. McNair in Washington, DC. The course objective is to ensure senior military leaders understand how military forces and other elements of national power are integrated and used to support national military strategies, and how joint, interagency, and multinational operations support strategic national objectives.

== History ==
On 26 May 1982, the Joint Chiefs of Staff (JCS) directed the National Defense University to establish a professional military education program for brigadier generals and rear admiral selectees. Two eleven-week pilot programs were offered in 1983. In February 1984, the JCS approved a permanent course to be offered once a year. This new course was eight weeks in duration. In July 1986, the JCS reduced the course length to six weeks and increased the frequency to two courses per year.

The Goldwater-Nichols Defense Reorganization Act of 1986 made CAPSTONE mandatory for all newly selected generals and admirals. Subsection 663(a) of the Act titled “Capstone Course for New Generals and Flag Officers,” specifically required that “Each officer selected for promotion to the grade of brigadier general or, in the case of Navy, rear admiral (lower half) shall be required, after such selection, to attend a military education course designed specifically to prepare new generals and flag officers to work with the other armed forces.” In 1987, the number of CAPSTONE courses was increased to four per year to satisfy the statutory requirement.

== Participation ==
In addition to all active duty generals and admirals, some newly appointed members of the civilian Senior Executive Service serving in the Department of Defense also attend along with some flag rank reserve and national guard officers and admirals from the United States Coast Guard. CAPSTONE participants are referred to as "Fellows" because of the unique nature of the course and the special expertise and qualifications of those officers attending. The course differs from senior service schools in four ways. First, the rank of its participants; second, the class size and course duration; third, the course focuses on the employment of military forces in support of United States national policy objectives; and finally, the course provides personal interaction with United States military’s most senior commanders. Guest speakers include the Chairman of the Joint Chiefs, all of the Service Chiefs, the commanders of all the unified commands as well as senior officials from the Department of Defense, Department of State, National Security Council, and members of Congress.

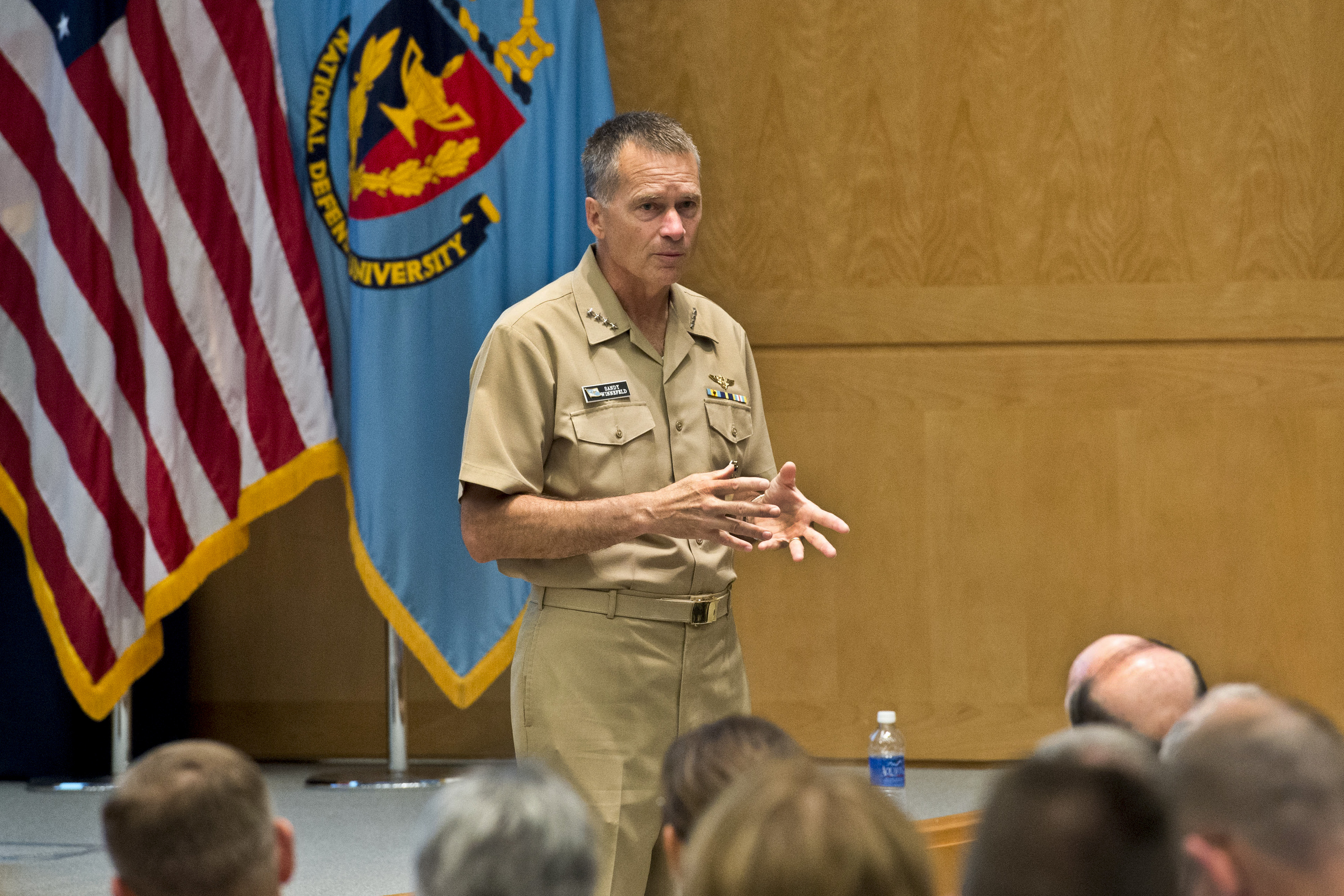
Admiral James A. "Sandy" Winnefeld speaking at CAPSTONE

The course requires intensive personal involvement on the part of each CAPSTONE Fellow through participation in seminars, field trips, discussions, and the current issues exercise. There are many opportunities for each Fellow to share expertise and experiences with other participants. The CAPSTONE course does not include formal writing or research assignments. The amount of required readings is modest and is used to highlight key issues and prepare participants for in-depth discussions. After their overseas field study, Fellows do prepare a trip report that captures their findings.

Several “Senior Fellows” are assigned to each CAPSTONE class. Senior Fellows are retired four-star generals and admirals who volunteer to participate in the CAPSTONE program. They provide a unique dimension to the course. Their principal contribution lies in their day-to-day contact with CAPSTONE participants. Their breadth of experience, often gained in politically sensitive positions, qualifies them to serve as role models, to interpret international events and military issues, and to provide insights not readily available from other sources.

All presentations and discussions at CAPSTONE are covered by the National Defense University’s non-attribution policy. As a result of this policy, nothing a speaker says during a class session will be attributed to the speaker directly or indirectly in the presence of anyone who was not authorized to attend the lecture. This policy is morally binding on everyone who participates in the CAPSTONE program.

== Curriculum ==
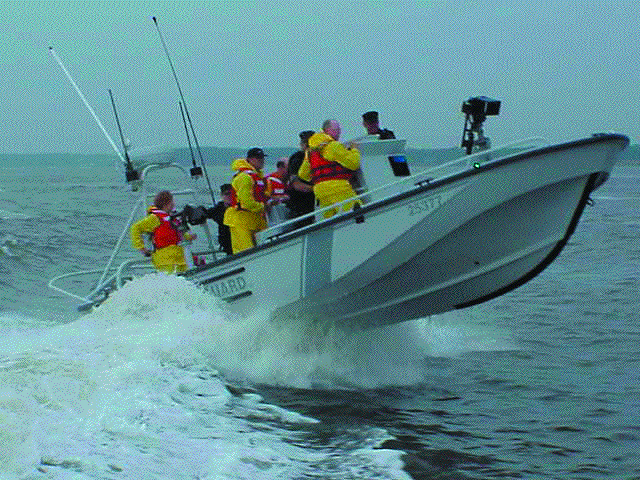
CAPSTONE fellows on Coast Guard tour

The CAPSTONE curriculum examines major issues affecting national security decision making, military strategy, joint doctrine, service interoperability, and familiarizes senior officers with allied nations. The course includes guest speakers, seminars, case studies, group discussions, and visits to military commands and operational units located in the continental United States. Students are divided into three groups to participate in overseas trips to Europe, the Pacific region, and the Western Hemisphere. The overseas field studies involve interactions with senior commanders of United States unified commands, American Ambassadors, allied military leaders, and senior political leaders of foreign governments.

During the course CAPSTONE Fellows analyze the national security policy process. They discuss joint doctrine and joint operational concepts. They study joint, interagency, and multinational capabilities, and discuss how these capabilities are best integrated to accomplish United States national security objectives. They discuss strategies for conduction joint and combined operations within modern theater battle space. They access the impact of defense acquisition programs and their implications for enhancing joint military capabilities. The course also analyzes the relationship between the military services, Department of Defense agencies, other cabinet-level departments, the National Security Council, Congress, the media, and the American public. The JCS Chairman annually reviews and approve the capstone curriculum.
