= James A. Williams =

United States Army general

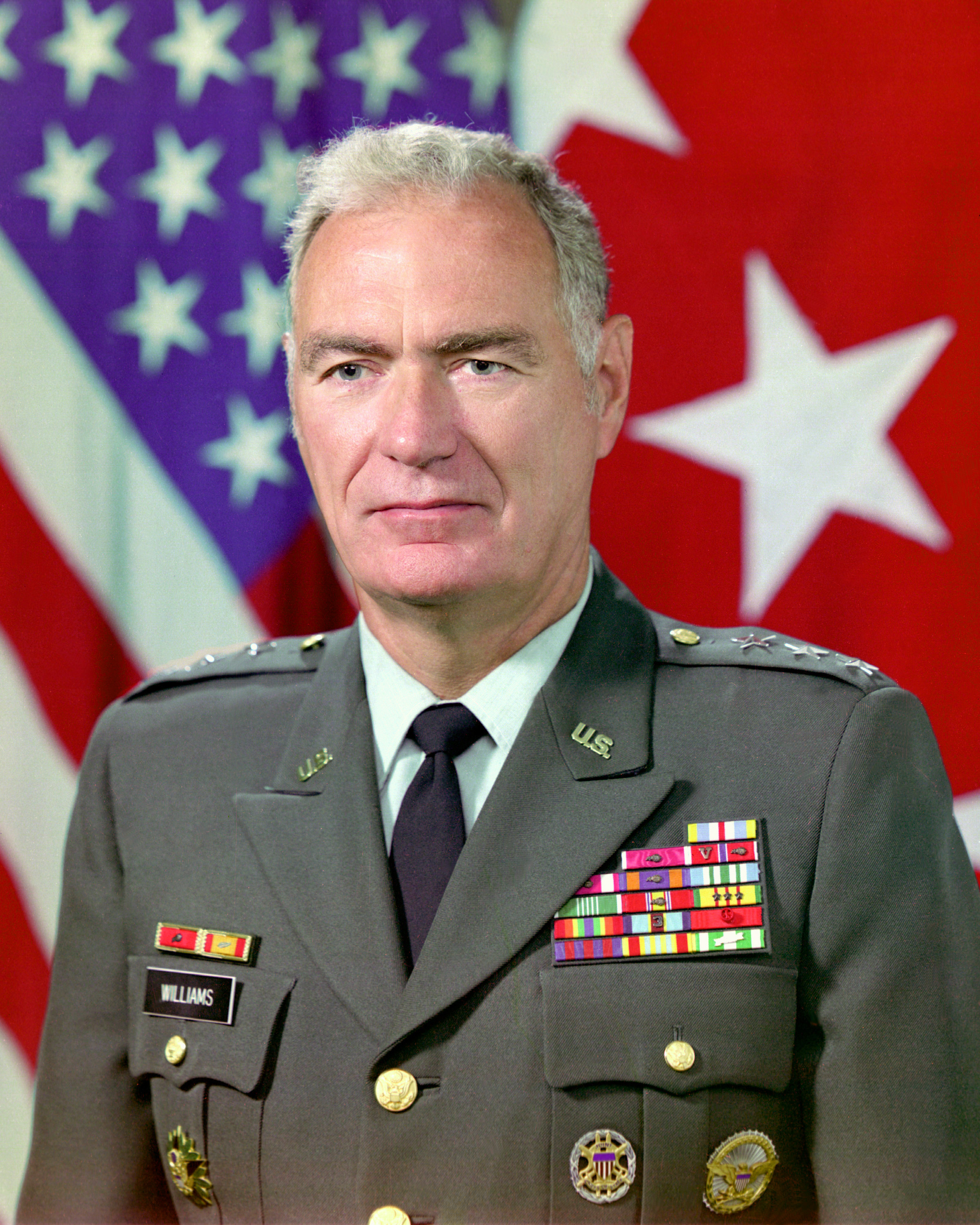
- Lieutenant General James A. Williams; Director of the Defense Intelligence Agency; September 1981 – September 1985
- Born: March 29, 1932; Paterson, New Jersey, U.S.
- Died: October 31, 2017 (aged 85)
- Military career
- Allegiance: United States of America
- Branch: United States Army
- Service years: 1954–1985
- Rank: Lieutenant General
- Commands: Director of the Defense Intelligence Agency; Commander, 650th Military Intelligence Group; Commander, 1st Military Intelligence Battalion
- Conflicts: Cold War • Vietnam War
- Awards: Defense Superior Service Medal; Legion of Merit (2); Bronze Star (2); National Intelligence Distinguished Service Medal

James Arthur Williams (born March 29, 1932 – October 31, 2017) was a United States Army lieutenant general. Williams served as Director of the Defense Intelligence Agency in the 1980s. He was a 1987 inductee of the Military Intelligence Hall of Fame and was the chairman of the board of directors for the National Military Intelligence Association.

== Early life and education ==
Williams was born in Paterson, New Jersey on March 29, 1932. As a youth, Williams paid his first visit to the U.S. Military Academy in May 1938, and four years later began his first Federal Service in May 1942 as a volunteer aircraft spotter for the 2nd Anti-Aircraft Region. As a youth he was active in sports, playing baseball, running track and swimming. He was a member of the 1950 NJ Group II State Basketball Championship Team and garnered Group II All State Honors. He was also an avid hiker and skier.

In 1954, Williams graduated from the United States Military Academy with a Bachelor of Science degree in Engineering and initially commissioned as a second lieutenant in Air Defense Artillery. He received a Master of Arts degree in Latin American Studies from the University of New Mexico in 1964. His military education includes completion of the Air Defense Basic Officers Course, the United States Army Intelligence School, the Artillery Officers Career Course, the United States Army Command and General Staff College, the Defense Intelligence School, and the National War College.

== Career ==
Williams began his career with Air Defense Artillery assignments, but except for a tour with the Field Command of the Defense Atomic Support Agency, his subsequent assignments were in the intelligence field. After assignments with the 470th Counterintelligence Corps Detachment, Fort Amador, Canal Zone and the 471st Counterintelligence Corps Detachment, Fort Brooke, Puerto Rico, he was assigned to the US Army Combat Developments Command at Fort Leavenworth, Kansas, where he was project intelligence officer for Tactical Aerial Reconnaissance and Surveillance, 1975 (TARS-75). After this, he served as the Assistant Army Attaché in Caracas, Venezuela. He then commanded the 1st Military Intelligence Battalion (Provisional), 525th Military Intelligence Group, United States Army Vietnam supporting the III Marine Amphibious Force(III MAF) and then served in the Office of the Deputy Chief of Staff for Military Operations in Washington, DC.

Remaining in Washington, Williams was named the Director of Political/Military Affairs, Bureau of Inter-American Affairs, State Department and Chief, Counterintelligence and Collection Division, and then Office of the Assistant Chief of Staff for Intelligence, Headquarters, Department of the Army. From there he assumed command of the 650th Military Intelligence Group (Counterintelligence) at the Supreme Headquarters Allied Powers Europe. Upon return to the United States, he was assigned to the Defense Intelligence Agency as Chief, Missile Forces/Strategic Arms Limitation Branch, Soviet/Warsaw Pact Division, and he later served as the Deputy Director for Estimates. Prior to his return to the Defense Intelligence Agency as its director, Williams served as Deputy Assistant Chief of Staff for Intelligence, United States Army, and the Deputy Chief of Staff for Intelligence, United States Army, Europe, leading the first team of DOD analysts to provide strategic early warning of Contingency Planning for Martial Law in Soviet-dominated Poland vice Warsaw Pact intervention. In September 1981, he was appointed the Director of DIA.

Williams culminated 31 years service with a four-year tour as Director of the Defense Intelligence Agency (DIA). He was the senior intelligence officer (SIO) for the Department of Defense (DoD) and directed intelligence analysis for DoD and the Joint Chiefs of Staff. He initiated widespread use of open source collection of foreign scientific and technical information by DIA as well as establishment of the Military Intelligence Integrated Data System(MIIDS). Under the General's supervision DIA, in conjunction with the Central Intelligence Agency, brought into operation the Secure Analyst File Environment(SAFE) an interactive system of intelligence analyst files. Under his direction DIA established the first formal requirements for imagery from civilian satellites such as LANDSAT. Williams was also instrumental in creating the first computerized threat methodologies for DoD and established the first threat validation system for the Defense Acquisition Cycle

Williams focused the Agency on enhancing support to tactical and theater commanders, improving capabilities to meet major wartime intelligence requirements, and strengthening indications and warning assets. In this regard he was responsible for establishing the first terrorism warning billets in the Agency and for placing the first United States Coast Guard Attachés on station. During his tenure the Defense Intelligence College was chartered by Congress to award a master's degree of Strategic Intelligence, the first federally chartered institution to be authorized to award a graduate level degree.

In December 1981, President Reagan signed Executive Order 12333 giving the Intelligence Community a mandate for the years ahead. In response to a requirement to improve intelligence support to the Unified & Specified Commands' war-fighting capabilities, the functional manager for intelligence processing was established in 1982. The Central America Joint Intelligence Team (CAJIT) was established in 1984 as an interagency analytical task organization focused on insurgency in Central America. DIA also created the Intelligence Communications Architecture to improve DoD's ability to disseminate national level intelligence to tactical commanders during contingency situations. The concept of intelligence as a “force multiplier in crises” became a predominant theme in planning as DIA began structuring an all source integrated database to support the Unified & Specified Commands in assessing the threat in the field Williams established a Research Crisis Support Center to provide a centralized, operationally secure, all-source, crisis management center to support the National Military Intelligence Center (NMIC) and the Unified & Specified Commands. As events deteriorated in Nicaragua, DIA analysts provided extensive support to the U.S. Southern Command.

Other analysis focused on the Falkland Islands War and Israel's invasion of Lebanon. When 6,000 U.S. troops invaded Grenada during Operation URGENT FURY in 1983, DIA's Task Force responded to numerous formal taskings for briefings and information, and distributed a wide variety of intelligence summaries to assist field commanders during the operation. The planning process for URGENT FURY was greatly facilitated by a number of intelligence products that had been prepared as early as 1979, bringing high praise for DIA's support and services. Other DIA analytical efforts during the year centered on the continuing crises in Nicaragua, Lebanon (the attack on the Marine barracks), Iran and Iraq, and Afghanistan, as well as the Soviet shoot-down of KAL 007, the civil war in Chad, and unrest in the Philippines. A significantly larger number of hijackings, bombings, kidnappings, murders, and other acts of terrorism led to characterizing 1985 as the "Year of the Terrorist."

Finally, Williams oversaw the Agency's move into its new headquarters at Bolling Air Force Base from Arlington Hall Station. The Defense Intelligence Analysis Center (DIAC) was dedicated on May 23, 1984.

Since his retirement from the U.S. Army in 1985, Williams has served as senior consultant for a variety of projects dealing with the collection, processing and analysis of intelligence; integration of intelligence data processing systems and revitalization of the civil remote sensing program. Williams played a major role as an advisor for two projects to improve imagery collection management. He also serves as a member of intelligence advisory panels for Los Alamos and Sandia National Laboratories and is a member of the Special Technologies Advisory Panel for the Department of Energy.

Williams was one of the pioneers in the use of open source data for commercial purposes. Since 1987 he has been President of the Direct Information Access Corporation (DIAC), which specializes in the production of commercial intelligence.

Williams served for five years as the Chairman of a task force overseeing the creation of the Defense HUMINT Service. He also served as an advisor for the Army on the Unmanned Aerial Vehicle Program and played a major role on two projects to improve imagery collection management.

Following are some of the programs and groups that he has participated in:

- USAREUR Polish Crisis Action Team Lead
- JTTRS – Joint Tactical Radio System
- Joint Logistics Study
- DOD Biometric Task Force Senior Review Group
- DCI Training Review
- DOD COOP – Referee, player and script writer at various times
- Task Force Williams- DIA HUMINT review
- LANDSAT Advisory Committee for the Congressional Committee on Science and Technology
- Author, DOD Requirements Management Study
- Author of OSD Review of Counterintelligence Proposals

== Awards and decorations ==
Williams' military decorations include the Defense Superior Service Medal, Legion of Merit with Oak Leaf Cluster, the Bronze Star with "V" Device and Oak Leaf Cluster, the Meritorious Service Medal with two Oak Leaf Clusters, the Air Medal, Joint Service Commendation Medal, the Army Commendation Medal, The National Defense Service Medal, the Vietnam Service Medal with four stars, the Army Service Ribbon, the Army Overseas Service Ribbon, the Vietnam Armed Forces Honor Medal, and the Vietnam Campaign Medal.

Unit awards include the Army Meritorious Unit Commendation, and the Vietnam Gallantry Cross Unit Citation, the French Legion of Honor and the German Order of the Knights Commander.

Badges include the Office of the Secretary of Defense Identification Badge, Joint Staff Identification Badge, the Army General Staff Identification Badge, the Defense Intelligence Agency Badge, and the Expert Marksmanship Badge.

Williams is also the recipient of the National Intelligence Distinguished Service Medal, He is a member of the Military Attaché Hall of Fame and is a Distinguished Member of the Military Intelligence Hall of Fame.

=== Medals and ribbons ===
U.S. military decorations
| Defense Superior Service Medal |
| Legion of Merit (with Oak Leaf Cluster) |
| Bronze Star (with Valor Device and Oak Leaf Cluster) |
| Army Meritorious Service Medal (with 2 Oak Leaf Clusters) |
| Air Medal (with Oak Leaf Cluster) |
| Joint Service Commendation Medal |
| Army Commendation Medal |
| National Defense Service Medal with oak leaf cluster |
| Vietnam Service Medal (with 3 stars) |
| Army Service Ribbon |
| Army Overseas Service Ribbon (with numeral 3) |
| Hazardous Service Medal |
| Vietnam Armed Forces Honor Medal, 1st class |
| French Legion of Honour, Officer |
| Order of Merit of the Federal Republic of Germany, Commander's Cross with Star |
| Vietnam Campaign Medal |
Unit awards
| Army Meritorious Unit Commendation with Oak Leaf Cluster |
| Vietnam Gallantry Cross Unit Citation |
Qualification badges
| Office of the Secretary of Defense Identification Badge |
| Office of the Joint Chiefs of Staff Identification Badge |
| Army Staff Identification Badge |
| Defense Intelligence Agency Badge |
| Expert Marksmanship Badge |
| Combat Service (Vietnam War – II Field Force Vietnam) |
National non-military awards
| National Intelligence Distinguished Service Medal |
| Defense Intelligence Agency Director's Award |

== Personal ==
Williams died in 2017 as the result of injuries sustained from a fall. He was interred at Arlington National Cemetery on March 12, 2018.

Government offices
| Preceded by Eugene F. Tighe | Director of the Defense Intelligence Agency; 1981–1985 | Succeeded by Leonard H. Perroots |
