= Colin Jackson (disambiguation) =

Colin Jackson is a Welsh sprinter and sports broadcaster.

Colin Jackson may also refer to:

- Colin Jackson (politician) (1921–1981), British Labour politician, MP for Brighouse & Spenborough in 1974
- Colin Jackson (Scottish footballer) (1946–2015), Scottish footballer
- Colin Jackson (Australian footballer) (born 1906), Australian footballer for Melbourne
- Colin F. Jackson, Naval War College faculty member
