= Afghanistan War Commission =

Bipartisan war commission for US war operations in Afghanistan

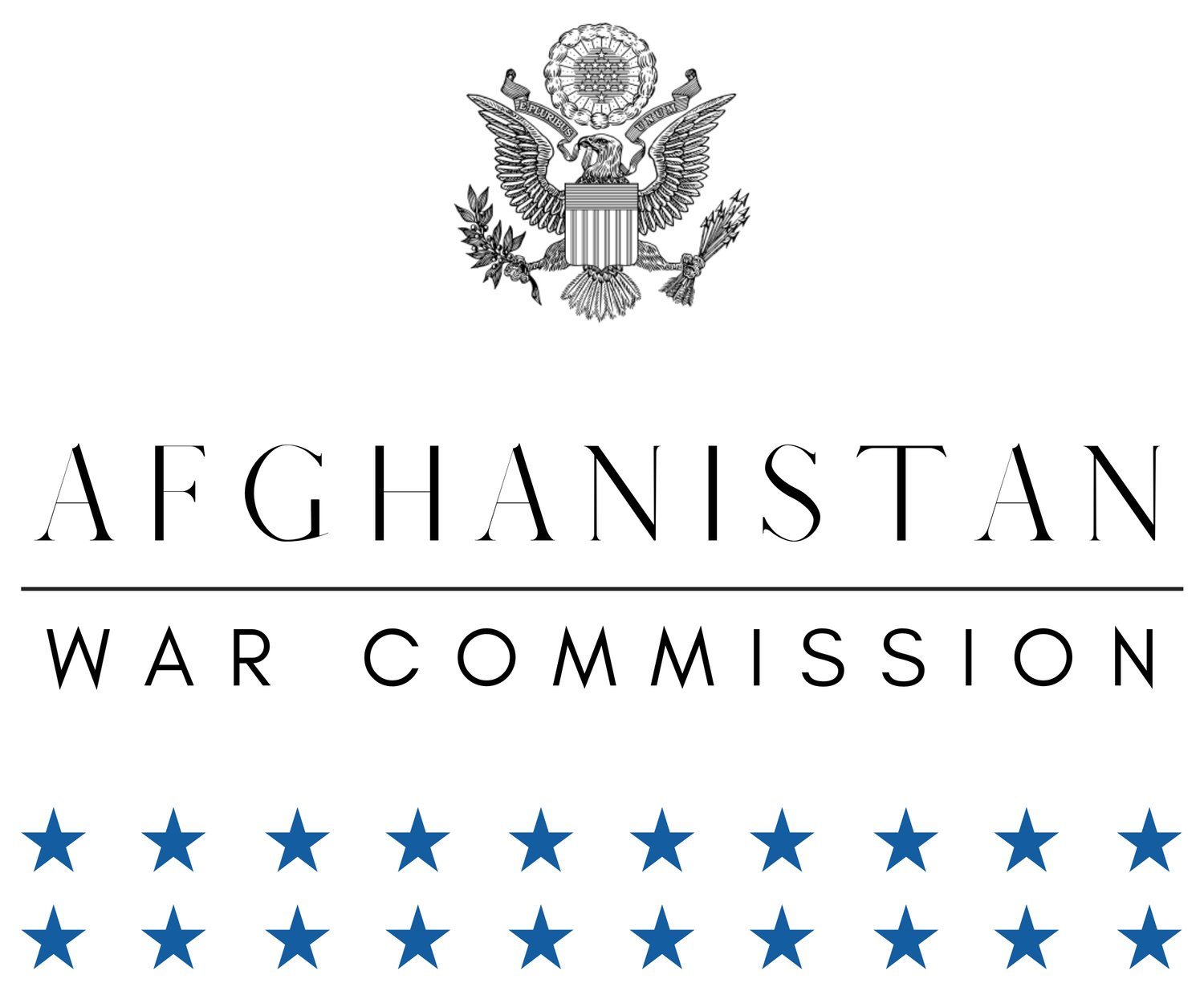

Agency overview
- Formed: 27 December 2021
- Agency executives: Shamila N. Chaudhary, Co-Chair; Colin F. Jackson, Co-Chair; Jaime Cheshire, Executive Director
- Website: https://www.afghanistanwarcommission.org/

The Afghanistan War Commission is a bipartisan legislative commission established to study the entirety of U.S. military operations in Afghanistan from 2001 to 2021. This commission was formally authorized as part of the 2022 National Defense Authorization Act.

The commission will spend four years studying all aspects of the U.S. involvement in Afghanistan, including military operations, the efforts of non-military government organizations, and the cooperation between those actors. The commission will draft a report of its findings, styled after the 9/11 Commission Report.

== Members ==
The following four members of this commission were nominated by the Congressional Armed Services Committees:

- Colin Jackson, chair of the Naval War College's Strategic and Operational Research Department
- Jeremy Bash, former chief of staff for the Department of Defense
- Michael Allen, former special assistant to President George W. Bush
- Michael Lumpkin, president of Amida Technology Solutions

Other commission members include:

- Shamila Chaudhary - American foreign policy expert, senior advisor at Johns Hopkins University School of Advanced International Studies
- Luke Hartig - Executive Director of the National Journal's Network Science Initiative, former senior director for counterterrorism at the National Security Council under the Obama administration
- Robert Ashley - Retired Army lieutenant general and the twenty-first director of the Defense Intelligence Agency (DIA)
- Laurel Miller - Former acting special representative for Afghanistan and Pakistan at the U.S. Department of State, 2013–2017
- Andrew Wilder- Vice president of Asia Programs at the United States Institute for Peace, previously served as director of Afghanistan and Pakistan Programs
- Anand Gopal - Journalist and author of No Good Men Among the Living: America, the Taliban and the War Through Afghan Eyes (2014)
- Seth Jones - Previously served as a plans officer and advisor to the commanding general, U.S. special operations forces in Afghanistan (Combined Forces Special Operations Component Command–Afghanistan)
- Christopher Molino - Army captain who served during Operation Iraqi Freedom, received Silver Star
- Ryan Crocker - Former U.S. ambassador to Afghanistan (2011–2012)
- Jeffrey Dressler - Served as professional staff member for the House Foreign Affairs Committee (Terrorism, Nonproliferation, and Trade Subcommittee) from 2013 until 2015, was national security advisor to both Paul Ryan (2017–2019) and Kevin McCarthy (2015–2017)
- Daniel P. Fata - Twenty-five years of experience working as a leadership staffer in both the House and Senate, and as deputy assistant secretary of defense for Europe and NATO at the Department of Defense
- Bob Taft - former Ohio governor

== Research plan ==
On December 27, 2021, Section 1094 of the National Defense Authorization Act for Fiscal Year 2022 (P.L. 117-81) established the Afghanistan War Commission to (1) “examine the key strategic, diplomatic, and operational decisions that pertain to the war in Afghanistan during the relevant period, including decisions, assessments, and events that preceded the war in Afghanistan” and (2) "develop a series of lessons learned and recommendations for the way forward that will inform future decisions by Congress and policymakers throughout the United States government.”

As of 2024, the Commission is seeking input from veterans who wish to share their perspectives on U.S. military operations in Afghanistan. The Commission published its interim report in August 2024.
