= Robert P. Ashley Jr. =

US Army general

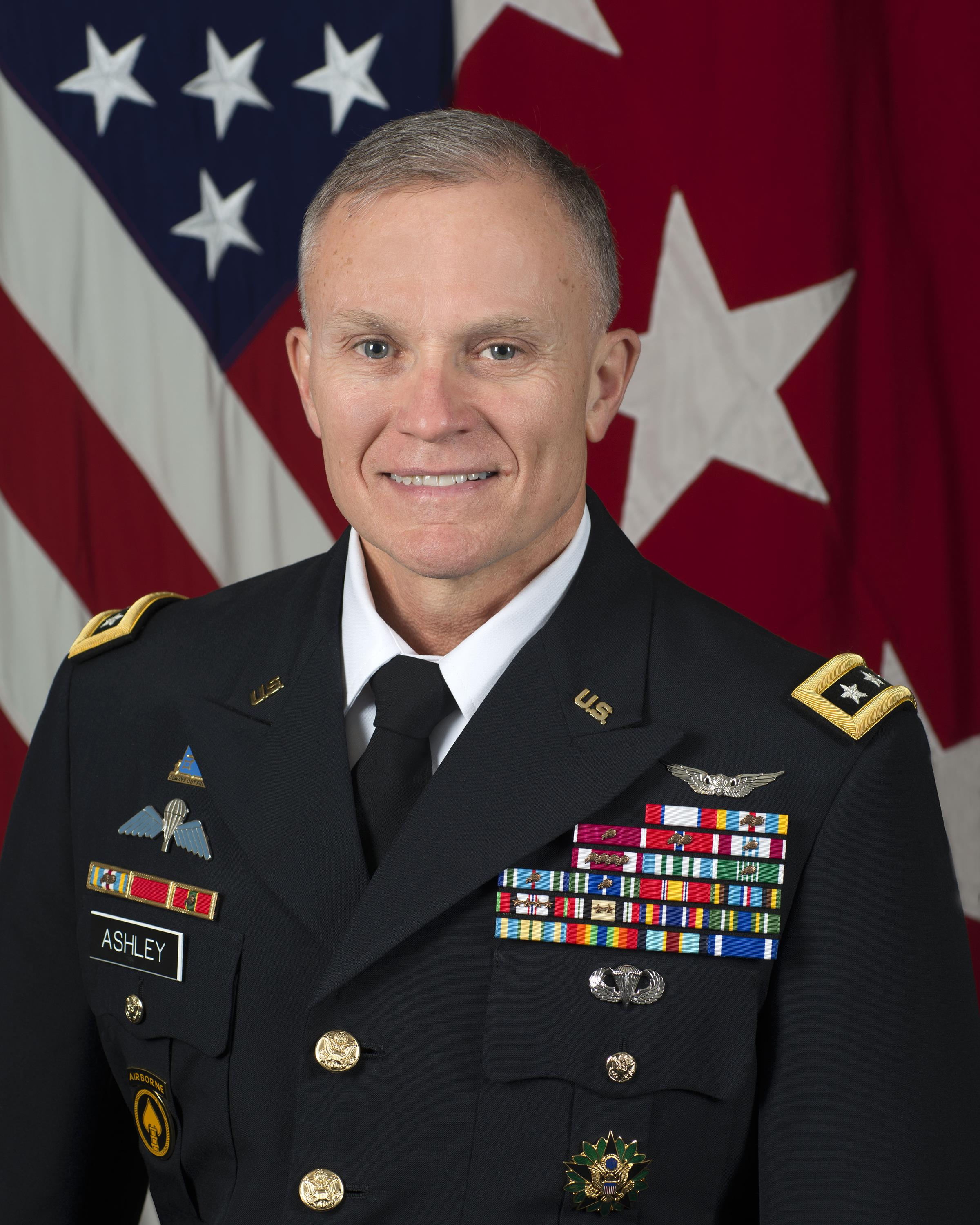
- Military career
- Allegiance: United States
- Branch: United States Army
- Service years: 1984–2020
- Rank: Lieutenant general
- Commands: Defense Intelligence Agency; United States Army Intelligence Center; 525th Battlefield Surveillance Brigade (Airborne); 206th Military Intelligence Battalion
- Conflicts: War in Afghanistan; Iraq War
- Awards: Army Distinguished Service Medal (2); Defense Superior Service Medal (3); Legion of Merit (2); Bronze Star Medal (3)

Robert Paul Ashley Jr. is a retired lieutenant general in the United States Army who served as the Director of the Defense Intelligence Agency from 2017 to 2020. He previously served as Deputy Chief of Staff of the Army G-2. He received a commission through ROTC as a 1984 graduate of Appalachian State University. He retired from active duty on October 1, 2020. He currently serves as Senior Advisor to the Chairman of Arcanum, a global strategic intelligence company. He is the son of a United States Air Force veteran of the Korean War who later lived in North Carolina and worked a sewing machine mechanic. Ashley is a commissioner on the Afghanistan War Commission.

== Education ==
- Bachelor of Science degree in political science, Appalachian State University, Boone, North Carolina.
- Master of Science degree in strategic intelligence management, National Intelligence University, Bethesda, Maryland.
- Master of Science degree in strategic studies, US Army War College, Carlisle Barracks, Pennsylvania.

== Military career ==
=== Operational deployments ===
- Intelligence Analyst, Allied Land Forces Southern Europe, Supreme Headquarters Allied Powers Europe, İzmir, Turkey
- Secretary to the Joint Military Commission, Stabilization Force, Operation Joint Forge, Bosnia-Herzegovina
- Commander, Office of Military Support, Washington, D.C., Operation Enduring Freedom and Operation Iraqi Freedom
- Commander, 525th Battlefield Surveillance Brigade(Airborne), XVIII Airborne Corps Operation Iraqi Freedom
- Deputy Chief of Staff, Intelligence, International Security Assistance Force and Director of Intelligence, United States Forces-Afghanistan

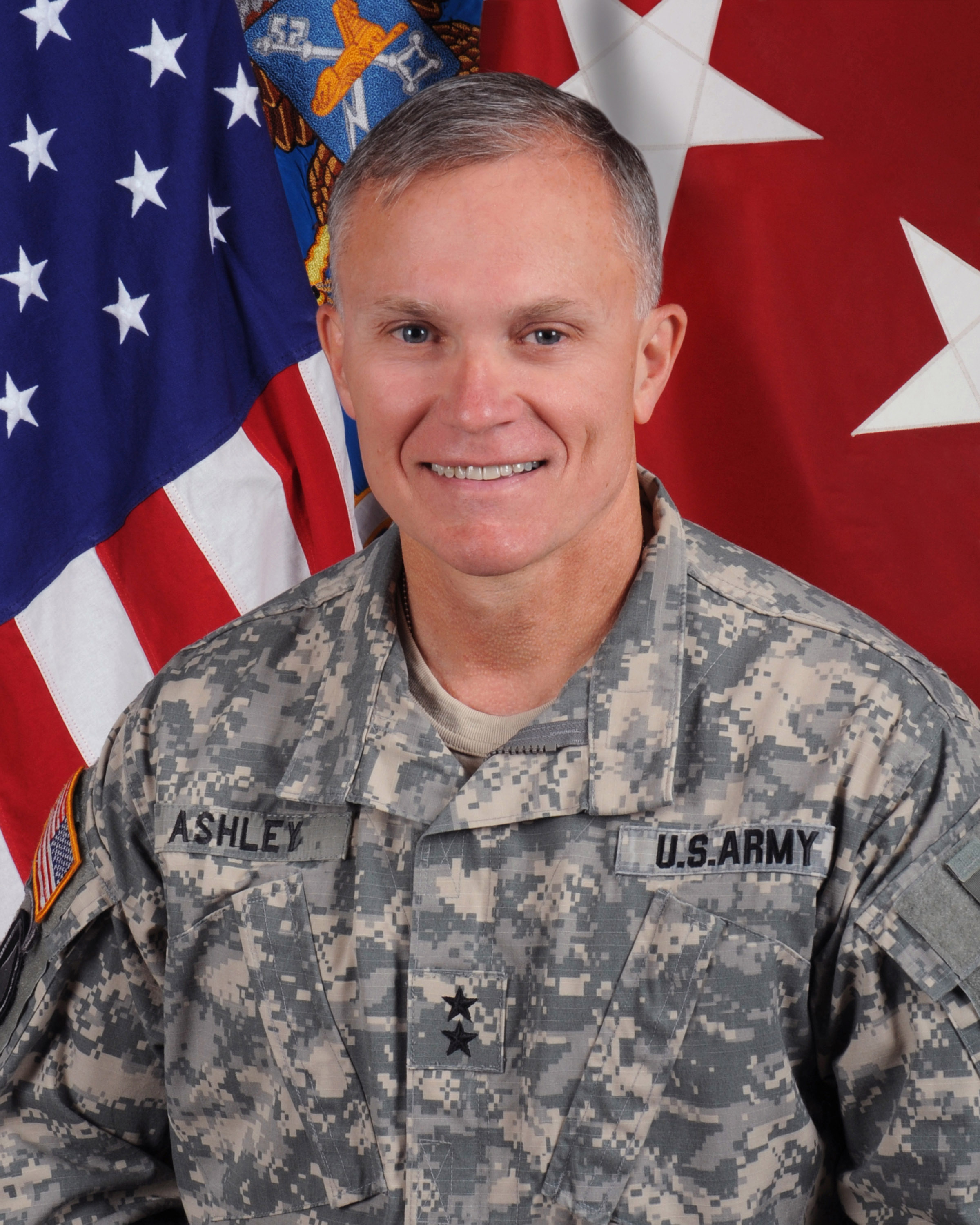
Lieutenant General Ashley

== Dates of rank ==
Rank	Date
Second lieutenant	May 23, 1984
First lieutenant	November 23, 1985
Captain	May 1, 1988
Major	May 1, 1995
Lieutenant colonel	June 1, 1999
Colonel	May 1, 2004
Brigadier general	June 21, 2010
Major general	January 3, 2013
Lieutenant general	March 2, 2016

== Awards and decorations ==
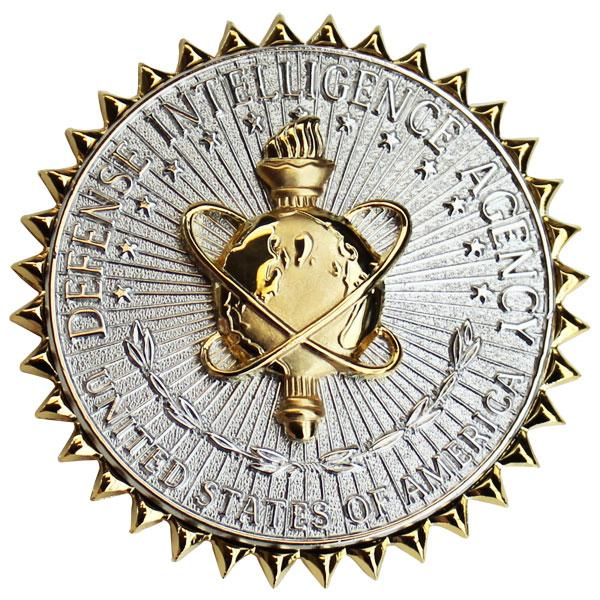
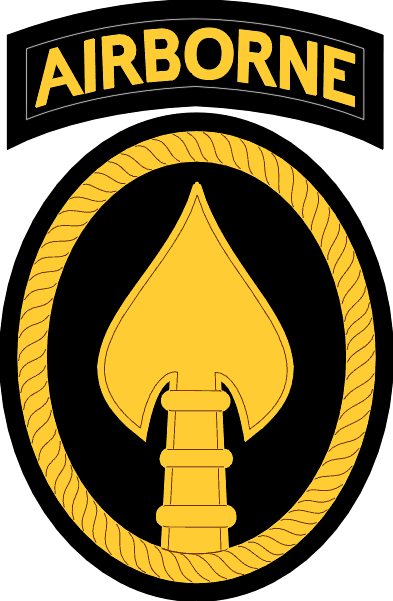
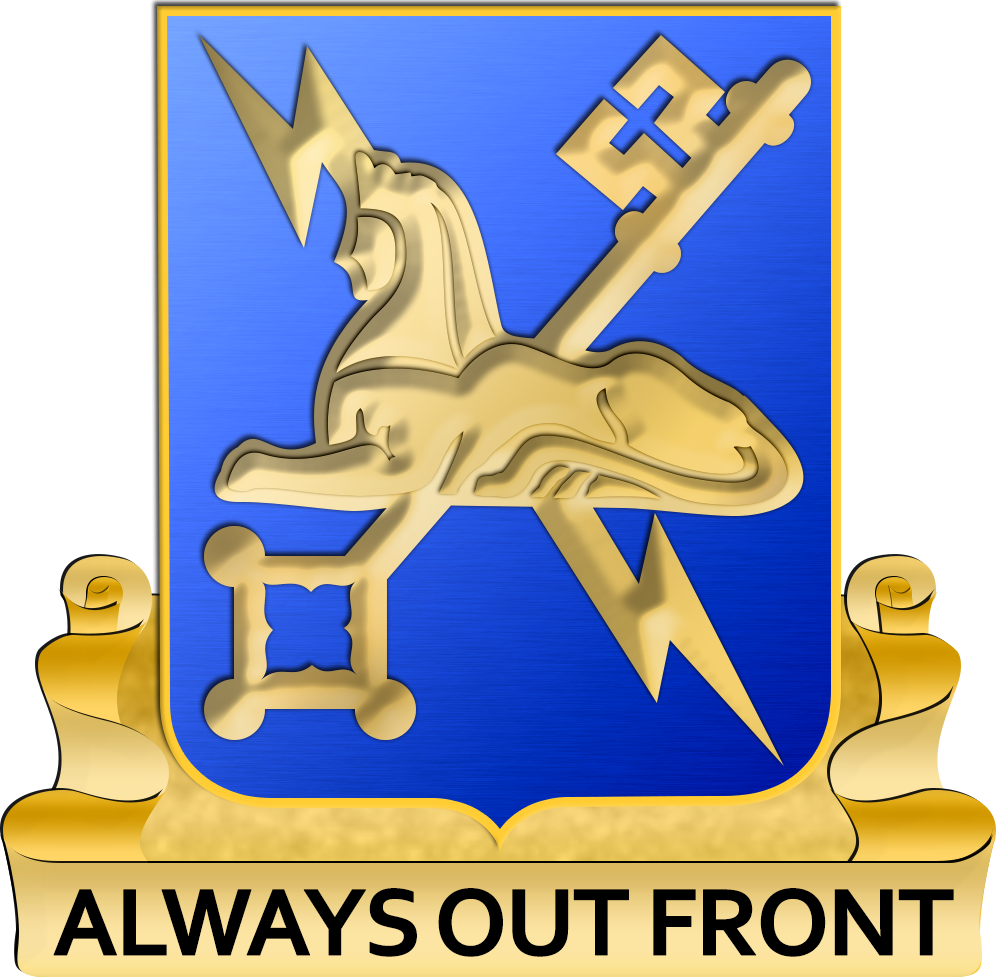
Basic Army Aircrew Badge
Basic Parachutist Badge
Army Staff Identification Badge
Defense Intelligence Agency Badge
United States Special Operations Command Combat Service Identification Badge
UK Parachutist Badge
Army Military Intelligence Corps Distinctive Unit Insignia
7 Overseas Service Bars

Army Distinguished Service Medal with one bronze oak leaf cluster
Defense Superior Service Medal with two oak leaf clusters
Legion of Merit with oak leaf cluster
Bronze Star Medal with two oak leaf clusters
Defense Meritorious Service Medal with oak leaf cluster
Meritorious Service Medal with four oak leaf clusters
Joint Service Commendation Medal
Army Commendation Medal with oak leaf cluster
Joint Service Achievement Medal with oak leaf cluster
Army Achievement Medal with oak leaf cluster
Joint Meritorious Unit Award with two bronze oak leaf clusters
Army Meritorious Unit Commendation
Army Superior Unit Award with oak leaf cluster
National Defense Service Medal with one bronze service star
Armed Forces Expeditionary Medal
Afghanistan Campaign Medal with four service stars
Iraq Campaign Medal with two service stars
Global War on Terrorism Service Medal
Korea Defense Service Medal
Military Outstanding Volunteer Service Medal
Army Service Ribbon
Army Overseas Service Ribbon
NATO Medal for the former Yugoslavia
Order of the Rising Sun (Japan), 2nd Class, Gold and Silver Star

Military offices
Preceded by Mary A. Legere	Deputy Chief of Staff for Intelligence of the United States Army; 2016–2017	Succeeded by Scott D. Berrier
Preceded by Vincent R. Stewart	Director of the Defense Intelligence Agency; 2017–2020	Succeeded by Scott D. Berrier
