= 9/11 Review Commission =

Commission reviewing the FBI's counterterrorism work

Federal Bureau of Investigation

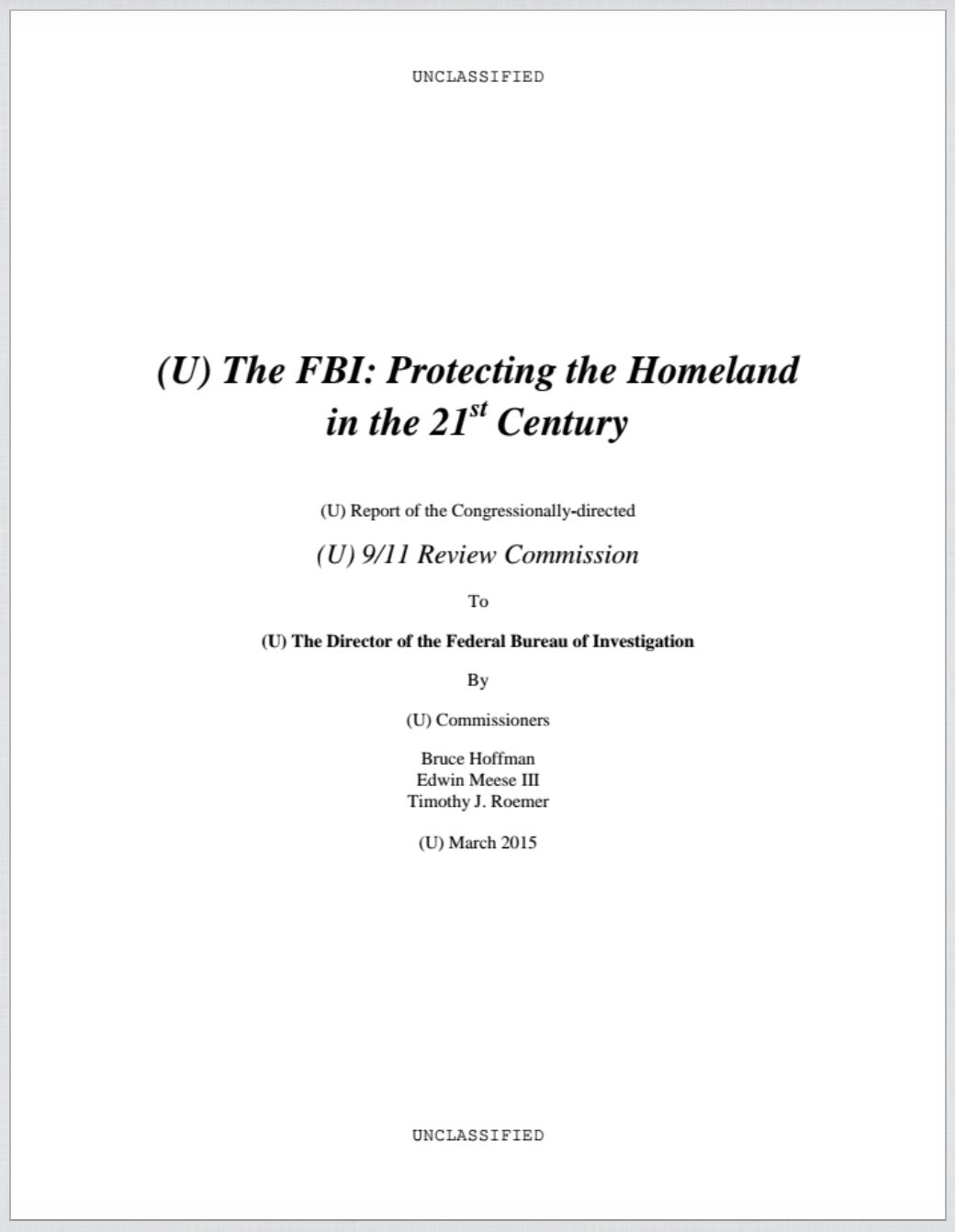
Cover page of 9/11 Review Commission Report

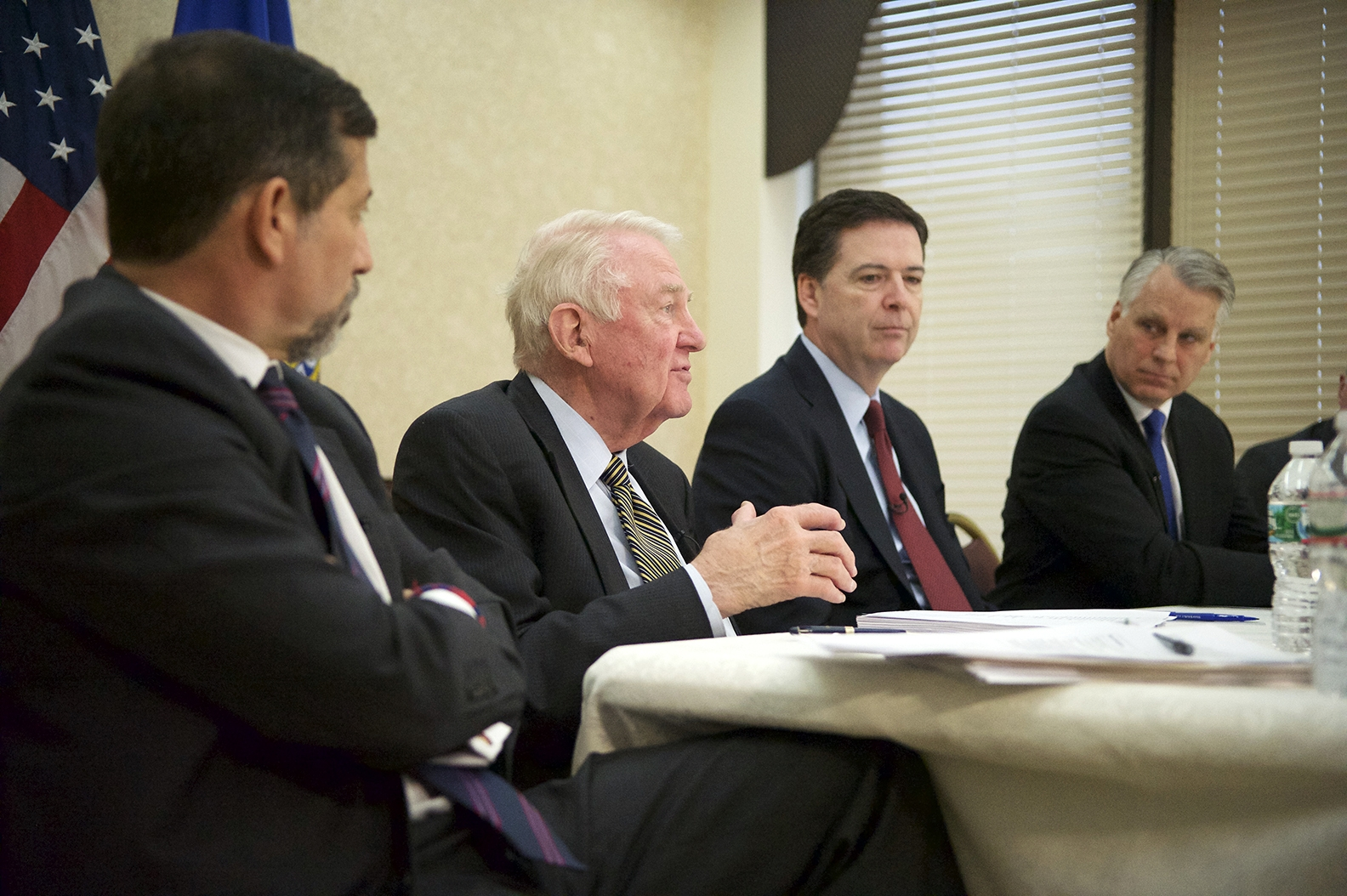
FBI Director James Comey receives briefing from 9/11 Review Commission members (March 2015)

The Federal Bureau of Investigation (FBI) 9/11 Review Commission was formed by Congress in January 2014 to conduct a comprehensive review of the recommendations related to the FBI that were proposed by the original 9/11 Commission. The commission, which was publicly announced by Republican Congressman Frank Wolf of (VA-10), consisted of three congressionally appointed members supported by an executive director and staff.

On March 26, 2014, the commission's members testified regarding their initial progress before the House Appropriations Subcommittee on Commerce, Justice, Science, and Related Agencies.

Following 14 months of research, interviews, briefings and field visits the commission issued an unclassified public version of its final report titled The FBI: Protecting the Homeland in the 21st Century on March 25, 2015. Its overarching conclusion was that while the FBI had made significant advances since 9/11, there remained "a significant gap between the articulated principles of its intelligence programs and their effectiveness in practice". The report found that the agency needed to urgently improve its ability to collect and efficiently analyze information, contending that the bureau was lagging "behind marked advances in law enforcement capabilities", noted a need to hire more linguists and translators, and stated that budget cuts had "severely hindered the F.B.I.'s intelligence and national security programs."

== Commissioners ==
- Bruce Hoffman - Professor, Georgetown University Edmund A. Walsh School of Foreign Service
- Edwin Meese - Former United States Attorney General
- Tim Roemer - Former Congressman from Indiana and Former United States Ambassador to India

== Staff Members ==
- John Gannon - Executive Director
- Kim Cragin
- William Giannetti
- Barbara A. Grewe
- Christine Healey
- Seth G. Jones
- Johanna Keena
- Joseph Moreno
- Jamie Pirko
- Elisabeth Poteat
- William Richardson
- Amy Buenning Sturm
- Caryn Wagner

== Case Studies ==
As part of its review, the Commission selected five case studies to examine the FBI's response to high-profile terrorist plots and attacks since 2008.

1. Najibullah Zezi, an Afghan-American arrested in September 2009 for working with al Qaeda to plan suicide bombings on the New York City Subway system
2. David Headley, an American terrorist of Pakistani origin who conspired in plotting the 2008 Mumbai attacks
3. Nidal Hasan, a former American Army Major convicted of killing 13 people and injuring more than 30 others in the Fort Hood mass shooting in November 2009
4. Faisal Shahzad, a Pakistani-American citizen who was arrested for the attempted Times Square car bombing in May 2010
5. Tamerlan Tsarnaev and Dzhokhar Tsarnaev who, together, killed 3 people and injured nearly 300 others by bombing the Boston Marathon in April 2013

== Individuals interviewed by the Commission ==
Current and former government officials who were interviewed by the commission included:

- John MacGaffin
- Maureen Baginski
- Seamus Hughes
- Philip Mudd
- George Salameh
- Charles Allen
- Gabriel Weimann
- Jerome P. Bjelopera
- Harvey Rishikof
- Michael Leiter
- Christopher Kojm
- Michael German
- Kenneth Wainstein
- David Pekoske & Kathleen Kiernan
- John Pistole
- Henry Hollatz
- Robert Newton
- Glen Fine
- Kshemendra Paul
- James Dinkins
- Dawn Scalici and James Blasingame
- Bassem Youseff
- Christopher Inglis
- Robert Mueller
- James Clapper
- Francis Taylor
- Gil Kerlikowski
- David Shedd
- Theodore Nicholas
- Patrick Reynolds
- Michael Flynn
- John Brennan
