= Scott D. Berrier =

United States Army general officer

Scott Berrier
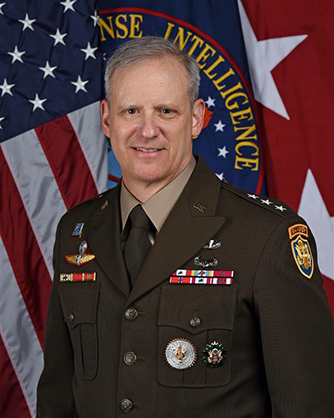
- Official portrait, 2021
- Military career
- Allegiance: United States
- Branch: United States Army
- Service years: 1986–2026
- Rank: Lieutenant General
- Commands: United States Army Intelligence Center; 501st Military Intelligence Brigade; 110th Military Intelligence Battalion
- Conflicts: War in Afghanistan; Iraq War
- Awards: Army Distinguished Service Medal (2); Defense Superior Service Medal (3); Legion of Merit (2); Bronze Star Medal (2); Officer of the Order of Australia (Australia)

Scott David Berrier is an active lieutenant general in the United States Army who was the Director of the Defense Intelligence Agency from 2020 to 2024. Berrier was confirmed by the United States Senate as the 22nd Director of the Defense Intelligence Agency on July 30, 2020, replacing the retiring Lieutenant General Robert P. Ashley Jr. He previously was the Deputy Chief of Staff of the Army G-2 (intelligence). He received his officer's commission in 1983 through the ROTC program at the University of Wisconsin–Stevens Point.

== Education ==
Berrier holds a Bachelor of Science in History from the University of Wisconsin-Stevens Point in Stevens Point, Wisconsin, a Master of Science in General Studies from Central Michigan University in Mount Pleasant, Michigan, and a Master of Science in Strategic Studies from the United States Army War College in Carlisle Barracks, Pennsylvania.

== Military career ==
=== Operational deployments ===
- Deputy Chief of Staff, Intelligence, International Security Assistance Force (later Resolute Support) North Atlantic Treaty Organization; deputy director, J-2, United States Forces-Afghanistan, Operation Enduring Freedom and Freedom Sentinel.
- Intelligence Officer, CJ-2, United States Forces-Iraq, Operation Iraqi Freedom
- Director of Intelligence, CJ-2, Combined Task Force-76, Operation Enduring Freedom
- Commander, 110th Military Intelligence Battalion, 10th Mountain Division (Light); Director of Intelligence, CJ-2, Combined Joint TaskForce-180, Operation Enduring Freedom
- Director of Intelligence, J-2, Special Operations Command Central, Operation Enduring Freedom in Qatar.

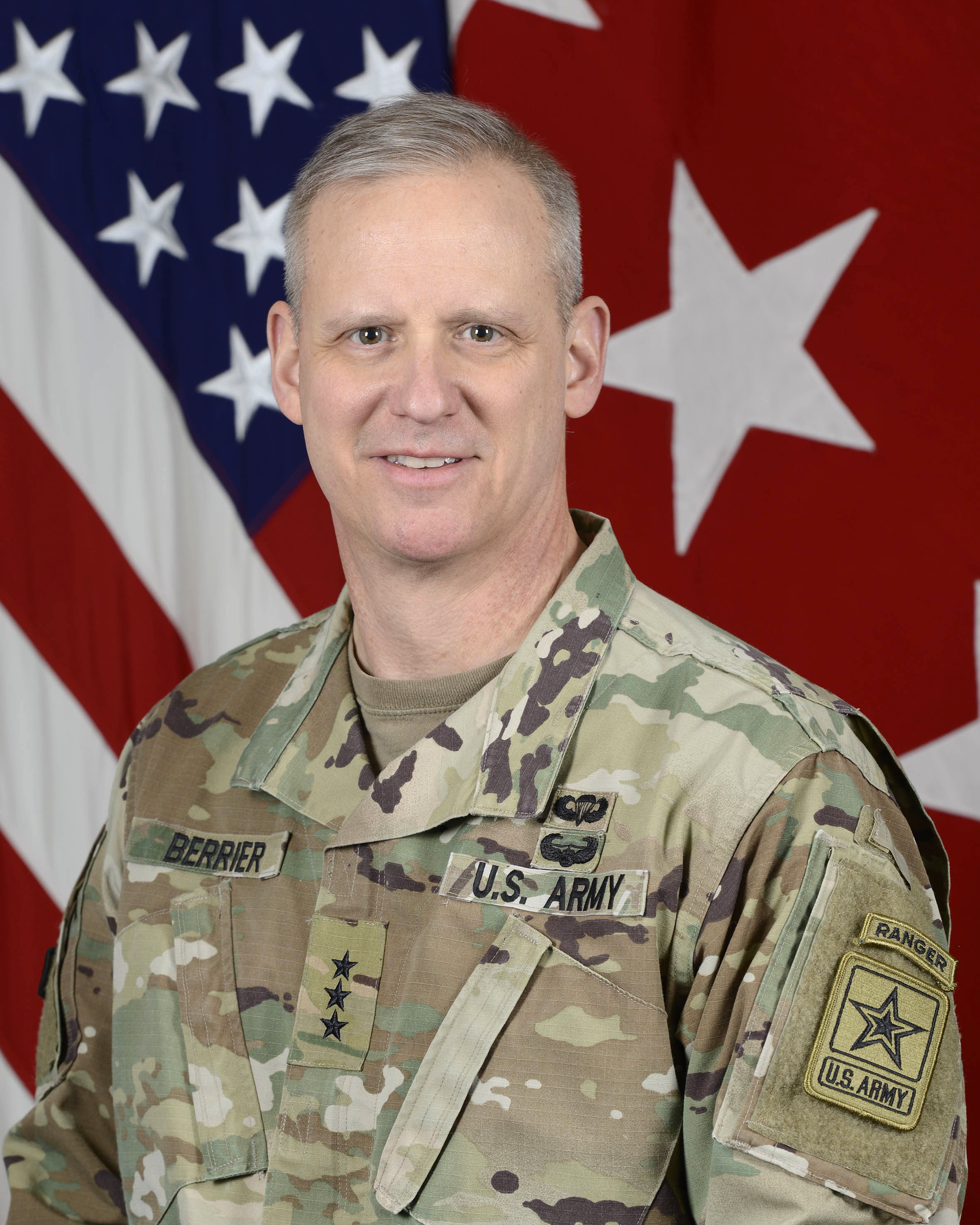
Lieutenant General Scott D. Berrier

== Dates of rank ==
Rank	Date
Second lieutenant	May 25, 1983
First lieutenant	March 24, 1986
Captain	February 1, 1989
Major	February 1, 1996
Lieutenant colonel	May 1, 2001
Colonel	February 1, 2006
Brigadier general	September 3, 2011
Major general	March 2, 2014
Lieutenant general	January 30, 2018

== Awards and decorations ==
Army Distinguished Service Medal with one bronze oak leaf cluster
Defense Superior Service Medal with two oak leaf clusters
Legion of Merit with oak leaf cluster
Bronze Star Medal with one oak leaf cluster
Defense Meritorious Service Medal with oak leaf cluster
Meritorious Service Medal with three oak leaf clusters
Army Commendation Medal with oak leaf cluster
Joint Service Achievement Medal
Army Achievement Medal with oak leaf cluster
National Defense Service Medal with one bronze service star
Armed Forces Expeditionary Medal
Afghanistan Campaign Medal with three service stars
Iraq Campaign Medal
Global War on Terrorism Expeditionary Medal
Global War on Terrorism Service Medal
Korea Defense Service Medal
Armed Forces Reserve Medal
Army Service Ribbon
Army Overseas Service Ribbon with bronze award numeral 6
NATO Medal for service with ISAF
Honorary Officer of the Order of Australia, Military Division
Order of the Rising Sun, 2nd Class, Gold and Silver Star

Unit Awards
Joint Meritorious Unit Award with two oak leaf clusters
Army Meritorious Unit Commendation
Army Superior Unit Award

Badges and Tabs

Basic Parachutist Badge

Ranger Tab

Air Assault Badge

Army Staff Identification Badge

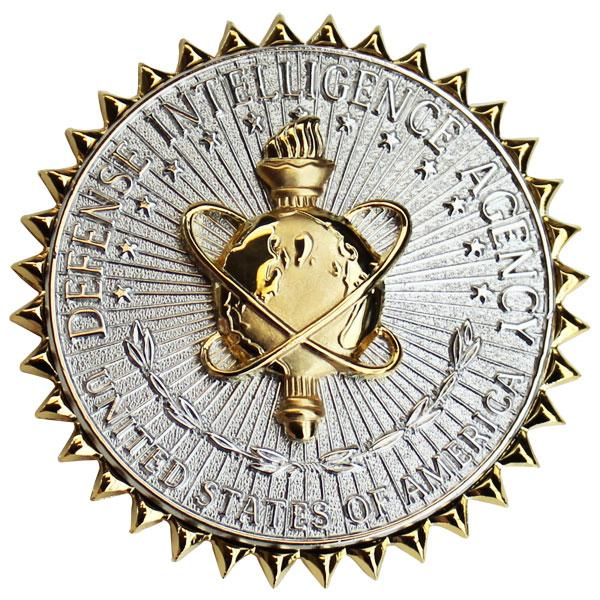

Defense Intelligence Agency Badge

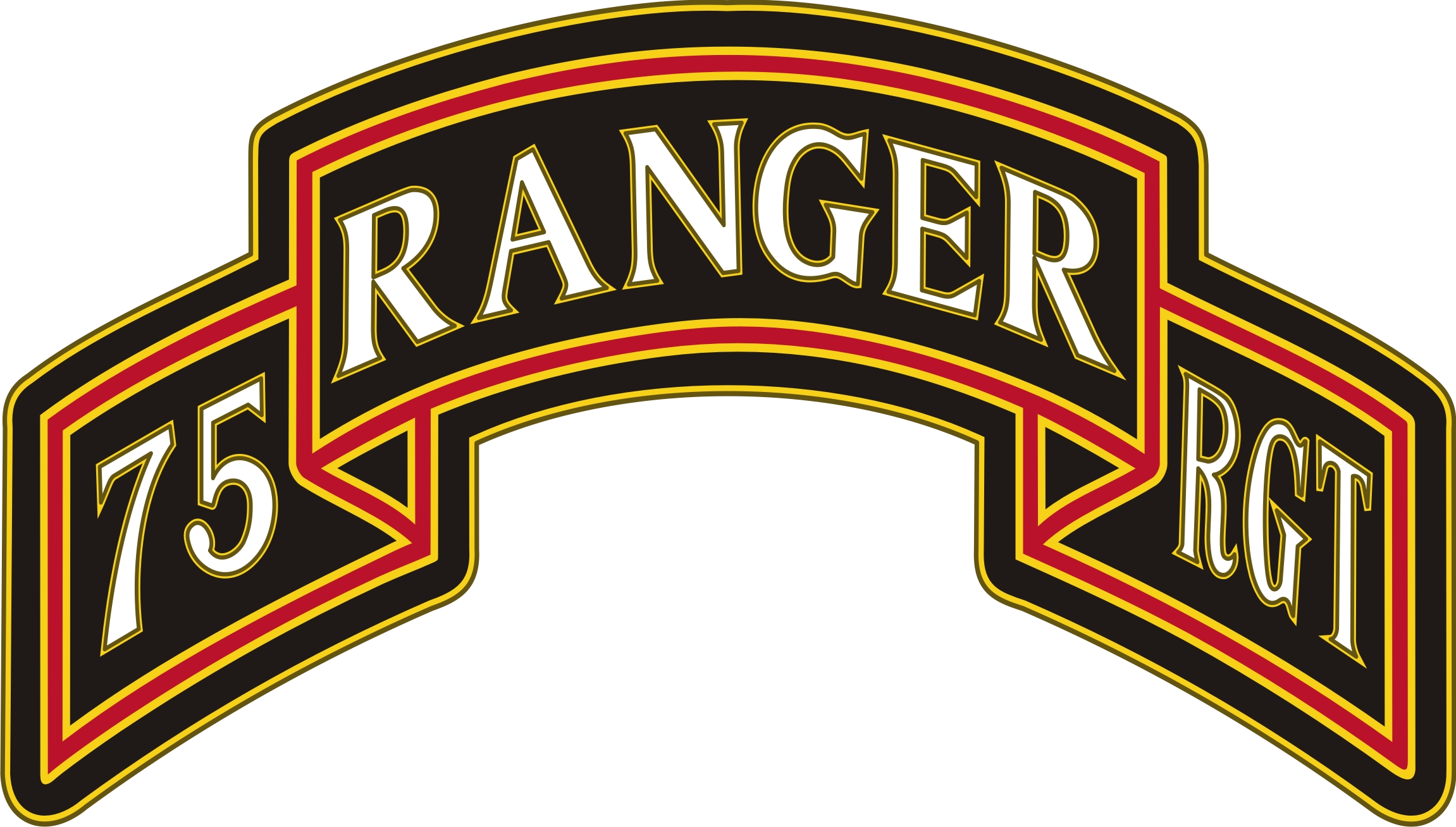

75th Ranger Regiment Combat Service Identification Badge

Thailand Parachutist Badge

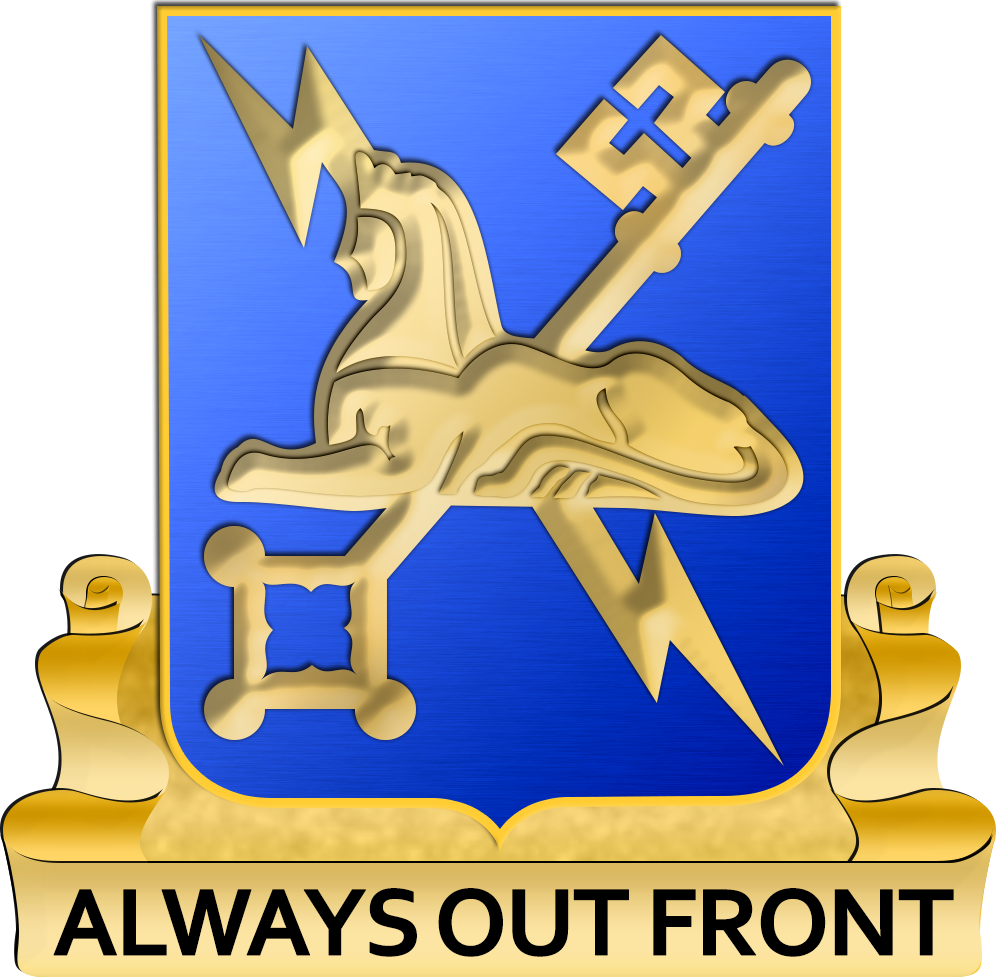

Army Military Intelligence Corps Distinctive Unit Insignia

6 Overseas Service Bars

Military offices
Preceded by Robert P. Ashley Jr.	Director of Intelligence of the United States Central Command; 2011–2014	Succeeded by Steven R. Grove
Preceded by Gregg C. Potter	Deputy Chief of Staff for Intelligence of the Resolute Support Mission; 2014–2015	Succeeded by Mark R. Quantock
Preceded by Robert P. Ashley Jr.	Commanding General of the United States Army Intelligence Center; 2015–2017	Succeeded by Robert P. Walters
Preceded by Robert P. Ashley Jr.	Deputy Chief of Staff for Intelligence of the United States Army; 2018–2020	Succeeded by Laura A. Potter
Preceded by Robert P. Ashley Jr.	Director of the Defense Intelligence Agency; 2020–2024	Succeeded by Jeffrey A. Kruse
