= Seth Jones (political scientist) =

American political scientist

Seth G. Jones is an American academic, political scientist, author, and former senior official in the U.S. Department of Defense. Jones is most known for his work on defense strategy, the defense industrial base, irregular warfare, and counter-terrorism. Much of his published work and media interviews are on defense strategy; Chinese, Russian, and Iranian conventional and irregular capabilities and actions; and terrorist and insurgent groups such as al-Qaeda and the Islamic State. He is currently a senior vice president at the Center for Strategic and International Studies.

== Biography ==
Seth G. Jones is senior vice president, Harold Brown Chair, and Director of the International Security Program at the Center for Strategic and International Studies (CSIS) in Washington, D.C. He also teaches at Johns Hopkins University's School for Advanced International Studies and the U.S. Naval Postgraduate School.

Jones is a member of the Afghanistan War Commission, a bipartisan commission established by the U.S. Congress to study all aspects of the U.S. involvement in Afghanistan from 2001 to 2021. He also served on the 9/11 Review Commission, which was formed by Congress in January 2014 to review the counterterrorism and other recommendations related to the FBI that were proposed by the original 9/11 Commission in 2004.

Prior to joining CSIS, Jones was the director of the International Security and Defense Policy Center at the RAND Corporation, where he worked from 2003 to 2017. He also served as the representative for the commander, U.S. Special Operations Command, to the Assistant Secretary of Defense for Special Operations in 2010 and 2011, and as a plans officer and advisor to the commanding general, U.S. Special Operations Forces, in Afghanistan (Combined Forces Special Operations Component Command–Afghanistan).

From 2002-2009, he was also an adjunct professor at the Security Studies Program in the Edmund A. Walsh School of Foreign Service, Georgetown University, where he taught classes on "Counterinsurgency" and "Stability Operations."

Jones is the author of six books: Three Dangerous Men: Russia, China, Iran, and the Rise of Irregular Warfare (2021), A Covert Action: Reagan, the CIA, and the Cold War Struggle in Poland (2018), Waging Insurgent Warfare: Lessons from the Vietcong to the Islamic State (2016), Hunting in the Shadows: The Pursuit of al Qa'ida since 9/11 (2012), In the Graveyard of Empires: America’s War in Afghanistan (2009), and The Rise of European Security Cooperation (2007). He has published articles on U.S. foreign policy and defense strategy in journals such as International Security, Foreign Policy, The National Interest, Political Science Quarterly, Security Studies, Chicago Journal of International Law, International Affairs, and Survival, as well as such newspapers and magazines as The Wall Street Journal, The New York Times, Newsweek, Financial Times, International Herald Tribune, and The Chicago Tribune.

Jones graduated from Bowdoin College in 1995, with High Honors in Government, Phi Beta Kappa, and Summa Cum Laude. He received his MA in 1999 and PhD in 2004 from the University of Chicago.

== Defense and foreign policy views ==
In a 2023 report titled "Empty Bins in a Wartime Environment: The Challenge to the U.S. Defense Industrial Base," Jones argued that the U.S. defense industrial base and defense ecosystem were not adequately prepared for an era of great power competition. In a protracted regional war, such as against China in the Taiwan Strait, the United States would likely run out of critical weapons (such as Long-Range Anti-Ship Missiles, or LRASMs) in less than a week. Some of the findings were based on a series of CSIS wargames of a Chinese conventional invasion of Taiwan. Jones also argued that China's defense industrial base is on a wartime footing, while the U.S. industrial base remains largely on a peacetime footing. He noted that China's shipbuilding capacity was more than 230 times as large as the U.S.’s, and that one Chinese shipyard has more capacity than all U.S. shipyards combined.

In Jones's 2023 book, Three Dangerous Men, he argues that an increasingly important part of great power competition is irregular warfare: cyber attacks, the use of proxy forces, propaganda, espionage, and disinformation.

Jones wrote an historical analysis of Afghanistan and Pakistan for the 2009 book In the Graveyard of Empires: America's War in Afghanistan. The book examines the collapse of the Zahir Shah regime, the rise of the anti-Soviet war, the Afghan civil war in the early 1990s, the Taliban take-over of much of the country in the late 1990s, the U.S-led overthrow of the Taliban regime in 2001, and the subsequent insurgency.

== Books ==
- Empty Bins in a Wartime Environment: The Challenge to the U.S. Defense Industrial Base (CSIS, 2023).
- Three Dangerous Men: Russia, China, Iran and the Rise of Irregular Warfare (W.W. Norton, 2021).
- A Covert Action: Reagan, the CIA, and the Cold War Struggle in Poland (W.W. Norton, 2018).
- Waging Insurgent Warfare (Oxford University Press, 2017).
- Hunting in the Shadows: The Pursuit of Al Qa’ida Since 9/11 (W.W. Norton, 2012).
- In the Graveyard of Empires: America's War in Afghanistan (W.W. Norton, 2009).
- Occupying Iraq: A History of the Coalition Provisional Authority (RAND, 2009).
- How Terrorist Groups End: Lessons for Countering Al Qa'ida (RAND, 2008).
- Counterinsurgency in Afghanistan (RAND, 2008).
- The Rise of European Security Cooperation (Cambridge University Press, 2007).
- Establishing Law and Order after Conflict (RAND, 2005).
- The UN's Role in Nation-Building: From Congo to Iraq (RAND, 2005).
- America's Role in Nation-Building: From Germany to Japan (RAND, 2003).
