= David Shedd =

American intelligence officer

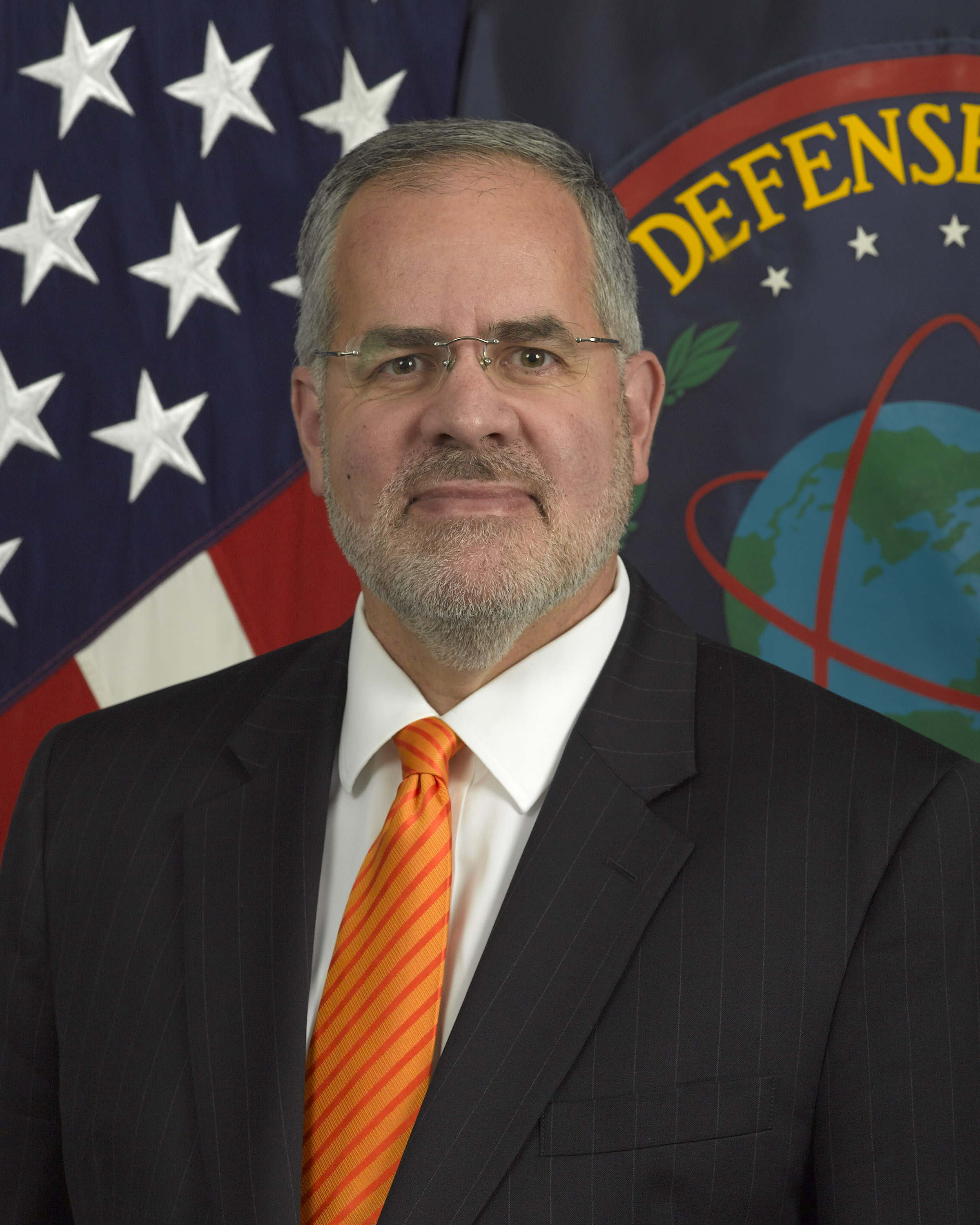
- Official DIA portrait of Deputy Director Shedd

Director of the Defense Intelligence Agency Acting
- In office August 7, 2014 – January 23, 2015
- President: Barack Obama
- Deputy: Doug Wise
- Preceded by: Michael T. Flynn
- Succeeded by: Vincent R. Stewart

Deputy Director of the Defense Intelligence Agency
- In office August 1, 2010 – August 7, 2014
- President: Barack Obama
- Director: Ronald L. Burgess Jr. Michael Flynn

Deputy Director of National Intelligence for Policy, Plans, and Requirements
- In office May 1, 2007 – August 1, 2010
- President: George W. Bush; Barack Obama
- Preceded by: Robert Cardillo

Personal details
- Education: Georgetown University; Geneva College

David R. Shedd is a retired U.S. intelligence officer whose final post was as the acting Director of the Defense Intelligence Agency. He is a former Central Intelligence Agency operative.

== Education and early career ==
Shedd holds a B.A. degree from Geneva College, and a M.A. degree from Georgetown University's Edmund A. Walsh School of Foreign Service in Latin American studies. From 1984 to 1993, he was posted overseas in the U.S. embassies in Costa Rica and Mexico. He has held a variety of senior management assignments including Chief of Congressional Liaison at the Central Intelligence Agency.

== Intelligence career ==
Shedd served from May 2007 to August 2010 as the Deputy Director of National Intelligence (DNI) for Policy, Plans, and Requirements, where he oversaw the formulation and implementation of major Intelligence Community (IC) policies from information sharing and IC authorities to analytic standards, among others. In particular, he led the review of Executive Order 12333, the foundational U.S. intelligence policy, which was revised by President George W. Bush in July 2008. Shedd also developed and implemented a National Intelligence Strategy, published in August 2009 for the IC and led strategic planning efforts to determine intelligence priorities for the IC and the nation.

From May 2005 to April 2007, Shedd served as Chief of Staff and, later, acting director of the Intelligence Staff to the Director of National Intelligence. Before the creation of the Office of the Director of National Intelligence, Shedd held intelligence policy positions at the National Security Council (NSC) from February 2001 to May 2005. He served most recently as the NSC's Special Assistant to the President and Senior Director for Intelligence Programs and Reform. Shedd helped implement intelligence reform stemming from the 9/11 Commission report in July 2004, the Intelligence Reform and Terrorism Prevention Act of 2004, and the Weapons of Mass Destruction (WMD) Commission's report to the President in March 2005.

Shedd was named deputy director of the Defense Intelligence Agency in August 2010. In this capacity, he assisted the Director's management of more than 16,500 employees worldwide.

Government offices
Preceded by Michael T. Flynn	Director of the Defense Intelligence Agency; Acting; 2014–2015	Succeeded by Vincent R. Stewart
