= Eugene F. Tighe =

United States Air Force general

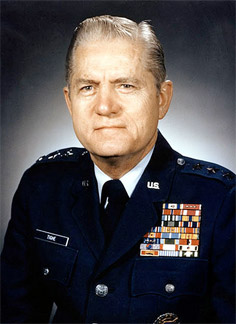
- Official portrait of Eugene F. Tighe, Jr.
- Born: June 19, 1921; New Raymer, Colorado, U.S.
- Died: January 29, 1994 (aged 72); San Diego, California, U.S.
- Military career
- Allegiance: United States of America
- Branch: United States Air Force
- Service years: 1942–1981
- Rank: Lieutenant General
- Commands: Director, Defense Intelligence Agency
- Awards: Air Force Distinguished Service Medal (2); Legion of Merit (4); Bronze Star Medal

Lieutenant General Eugene Francis Tighe, Jr. (June 19, 1921 – January 29, 1994) was director of the United States Defense Intelligence Agency (September 1977 – August 1981).

== Background and education ==
Tighe was born in 1921, in New Raymer, Colorado, and graduated from Manual Arts High School, Los Angeles, in 1939. He graduated from Loyola Marymount University, Los Angeles, in 1949 as a distinguished graduate, with a Bachelor of Arts degree in history.

The general also completed Air War College at Maxwell Air Force Base, Alabama in 1966, and received an honorary doctor of military science degree from Norwich University in Northfield, Vermont, in 1980.

== Military career ==
In September 1942 Tighe enlisted in the U.S. Army and served at Fort Bliss, Texas; Camp Cooke, California; and in Australia. He graduated from the Artillery Officer Candidate School at Camp Columbia, Australia, in 1944 with a commission as a second lieutenant, and was assigned as an anti-aircraft adviser with the 43rd Bombardment Group, 5th Air Force, serving with the group in New Guinea, Netherlands East Indies, the Philippines and the Ryukyu Islands. In January 1946 he was released from active Army duty and accepted a Reserve commission in the U.S. Army Air Forces.

Tighe entered active duty with the U.S. Air Force in August 1950 as an intelligence officer with the 78th Fighter-Interceptor Group at Hamilton Air Force Base, California. He then served successively from September 1951 to October 1955 as an intelligence officer: one year with the 8th Fighter-Bomber Group at Suwon Air Base, South Korea; two years with the 436th Bombardment Squadron at Carswell Air Force Base, Texas; and one year with the 7th Bombardment Group, also at Carswell.

He served with the U.S. Air Forces in Europe at Wiesbaden-Schierstein, Germany, as operations officer for the 497th Reconnaissance Technical Squadron from October 1955 to August 1958. Tighe was then assigned to the 544th Aerospace Reconnaissance Technical Wing at Offutt Air Force Base, Nebraska where he organized the Research Center of the wing in January 1960, and remained as its chief until June 1965.

He attended the Air War College from August 1965 to June 1966.

Following graduation from the Air War College, Tighe was assigned as director of targets, Headquarters 7th Air Force at Tan Son Nhut Air Base, Republic of Vietnam.

He transferred to Headquarters U. S. Air Force, Washington, D.C., in August 1967, and served in the Directorate of Operations as special assistant in the Reconnaissance Division until July 1968, and as chief of the Operations Review Division until October 1969. In November 1969 he was assigned as deputy director of estimates, in January 1970 he was named director of estimates, and later served as director of intelligence applications in the Office of Assistant Chief of Staff, Intelligence.

Tighe was deputy chief of staff, intelligence, Pacific Air Forces, Hickam Air Force Base, Hawaii, from August 1971 until April 1972, when he became director for intelligence, Headquarters United States Pacific Command at Camp H.M. Smith, Hawaii.

From September 1974 to August 1976, he was deputy director of the Defense Intelligence Agency, and served as acting director from December 1975 to May 1976.

In November, 1975, MG Tighe was promoted to LTG.

Following his tour at DIA as Acting Deputy DIA, LTG Tighe was expected to retire, there being no posts available for a USAF LTG Intelligence Officer. At this, LTG Tighe requested to revert to MG so that he could become the deputy chief of staff for intelligence, Headquarters Strategic Air Command, a MG posting at Offutt Air Force Base in August 1976, and served in that position until he was assigned as assistant chief of staff, intelligence, at Air Force headquarters in January 1977.

In June 1977 the president appointed Tighe director of the Defense Intelligence Agency. He assumed his duties in September 1977. He was promoted (again) to lieutenant general on September 1, 1977, with date of rank of November 4, 1975. During July and August 1977, he served as special assistant to the director of the Defense Intelligence Agency.

He retired from the Air Force on September 1, 1981.

== Post-military career ==
In retirement Tighe became a consultant, and regent of Loyola Marymount University in Los Angeles.

In 1986 he headed a five-month Pentagon review on whether American prisoners of war might still be held captive in Vietnam and elsewhere in Southeast Asia—the panel concluded this might be the case.

Tighe died as a result of prostate cancer on January 29, 1994, at the age of 72.

== Awards and decorations ==
Joint Chiefs of Staff Identification Badge

Air Force Distinguished Service Medal with one bronze oak leaf cluster
Legion of Merit with three oak leaf clusters
Bronze Star Medal
Meritorious Service Medal
Joint Service Commendation Medal
Air Force Commendation Medal
Army Commendation Medal with oak leaf cluster
Air Force Outstanding Unit Award
American Campaign Medal
Asiatic-Pacific Campaign Medal with two bronze service stars
World War II Victory Medal
National Defense Service Medal with service star
Korean Service Medal
Vietnam Service Medal with service star
Air Force Longevity Service Award with eight oak leaf clusters
Small Arms Expert Marksmanship Ribbon
Philippine Liberation Medal with service star
Order of National Security Merit (Korea), Gugseon Medal
Order of the Cloud and Banner, Grand Cordon (Republic of China)
Republic of Korea Presidential Unit Citation with service star
Republic of Vietnam Gallantry Cross Unit Citation
United Nations Korea Medal
Vietnam Campaign Medal

Government offices
Preceded by Samuel V. Wilson	Director of the Defense Intelligence Agency; 1977–1981	Succeeded by James A. Williams
