= National Intelligence University =

Research university in Bethesda, Maryland, USA

Coordinates: 38.8424°N 77.0162°W

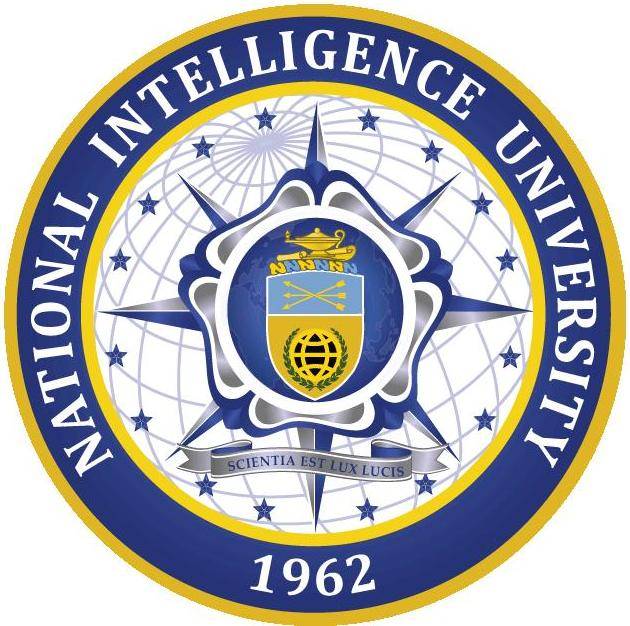
- Seal of the University
- Former names: Defense Intelligence School, Defense Intelligence College, Joint Military Intelligence College, National Defense Intelligence College
- Motto: Scientia Est Lux Lucis
- Motto in English: Knowledge is Enlightenment
- Type: Public research university
- Established: 1962
- Parent institution: Office of the Director of National Intelligence
- Academic affiliations: CUWMA
- Chairperson: Gilman Louie
- President: John R. Ballard, PhD
- Provost: Juanita M. Cole, PhD
- Dean: Amy Kardell, PhD, Dean, College of Strategic Intelligence
- Dean: Bradley Haack, PhD, Acting Dean, Anthony G. Oettinger School of Science and Technology Intelligence
- Academic staff: 80+
- Students: 700+
- Location: Intelligence Community Campus-Bethesda, Bethesda, Maryland, United States
- Campus: Suburban, multiple sites
- Colors: Blue and Gold
- Mascot: Culper the Owl
- Website: ni-u.edu
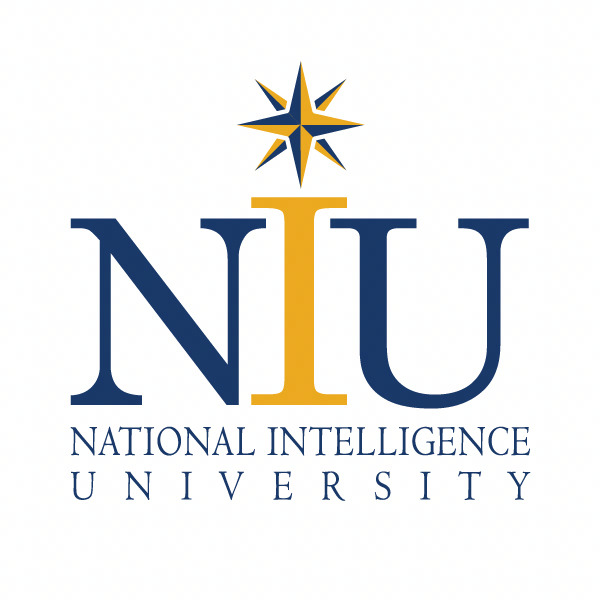

The National Intelligence University (NIU) is a federally chartered research university in Bethesda, Maryland, operated by and for the United States Intelligence Community (IC) as its staff college of higher learning in fields of study central to the profession of intelligence and national security. A small, highly selective non-residential university, NIU awards undergraduate and graduate degrees, a graduate certificate, and prestigious research fellowships to prepare personnel for critical positions in the IC and the broader national security enterprise. Since 1963, more than 80,000 military and civilian students have attended the university. Originally located at Defense Intelligence Agency headquarters at Joint Base Anacostia–Bolling in Washington, D.C., NIU's primary campus is now located just up the Potomac River at the Intelligence Community Campus-Bethesda (ICC-B) with four additional locations around the world.

National Intelligence University's interdisciplinary programs emphasize education through scholarly and applied research designed to help U.S. intelligence officers better understand the diverse range of geopolitical, strategic, and technological threats and opportunities affecting intelligence and national security. The university is organized into two separate academic units: the College of Strategic Intelligence and the Anthony G. Oettinger School of Science and Technology Intelligence. Combined, the college and school cover a diverse and evolving range of international affairs issues and adversarial threats and capabilities, from cultural and religious conflicts to WMD proliferation, cybersecurity threats, terrorism, transnational crime, and more.

Previously known as the Defense Intelligence School, the Defense Intelligence College, the Joint Military Intelligence College, and the National Defense Intelligence College, admissions are restricted solely to U.S. citizens who hold Top Secret/Sensitive Compartmented Information (TS-SCI) security clearances and are employed by the government in relevant national security positions. Applicants must be nominated by their agency or unit. Tuition is paid by the government. The Trump administration announced in August 2025 that the National Intelligence University will be shut down however Congress opted to move NIU under NDU.

== History ==
The United States Department of Defense established the Defense Intelligence School within the Defense Intelligence Agency in 1962 to consolidate existing U.S. Army and Navy academic programs in strategic intelligence. In 1980, the U.S. Congress authorized the school to award the Master of Science of Strategic Intelligence degree. In 1981, the Commission on Higher Education of the Middle States Association of Colleges and Schools accredited the School. That same year, DoD rechartered the institution as the Defense Intelligence College, placing additional emphasis on its research mission.

Since then, the university has added several off-campus programs at the National Security Agency and several regional centers and has encouraged an increase in enrollment from civilian agencies. On campus, it has also added two part-time graduate programs. Students from throughout the Intelligence Community attend the university, and they include active duty and reserve military personnel from each of the services (including the Coast Guard), DoD, and other federal civilian employees.

In 1993, the College was renamed the Joint Military Intelligence College. The College embarked on a new era in which its mission was more sharply defined. In 1997, Congress authorized the College to award a Bachelor of Science in Intelligence (BSI) degree. The BSI Program is a fourth year degree completion program. It affords those students who have accumulated three years of undergraduate credits a means to complete their degree requirements and to obtain a degree directly related to the field of intelligence. The Program enables BSI graduates to advance their careers within the National Intelligence Community.

In December 2006, DoD Instruction 3305.1 changed the name to the National Defense Intelligence College. The DoD Instruction was revised again in February 2011 to reflect the current designation — National Intelligence University — and the Director of National Intelligence formally and publicly announced that change as well as the expanded mission and vision of the NIU during the August 2011 convocation of the class of 2012.

In June 2021, the University officially transferred from the Defense Intelligence Agency to the Office of the Director of National Intelligence to better serve the diverse and varied needs of its students and the United States intelligence enterprise. “We are honored to officially welcome the National Intelligence University into the ranks of the Office of the Director of National Intelligence,” said Director of National Intelligence Avril Haines and NIU President Dr. J. Scott Cameron in a joint statement. “At no point has it been more important to sharpen our intelligence tradecraft with emerging expertise, strengthen our intelligence partnerships, and preempt long-term strategic threats with intellectual creativity. NIU’s academic leadership, combined with ODNI’s integrating role, stands to better serve the IC, federal government, and United States for years to come.”

== Vision and mission ==
The Center of Academic Life for the Intelligence Community – preparing today’s Intelligence Community leaders for tomorrow’s challenges.

The National Intelligence University advances the intelligence profession through a holistic, integrative, contextual approach to education that promotes dynamic teaching, engaged learning, original research, academic outreach, analytical problem solving, rigorous research methods, collaborative processes, and lifelong learning.

== Educational accreditation ==
The university is authorized by the United States Congress to award the degrees of Bachelor of Science in Intelligence, Master of Science and Technology Intelligence, and Master of Science of Strategic Intelligence. The university is accredited by the Commission on Higher Education of the Middle States Association of Colleges and Schools.

== Facilities and resources ==
The NIU Library houses 2.5 million items, including books, unclassified intelligence documents, reference materials, periodicals, microfilms, video and cartographic items. The library subscribes to 2,000 international periodicals, newspapers, annuals, serials, and statistical reports. It is particularly strong in Russian periodicals. The library has archival microfiche and microfilm collections of general and scholarly periodicals, Foreign Broadcast Information Service reports, and declassified documents. The NIU Library is located at the Intelligence Community Campus – Bethesda (ICC-B).

The Office of Research within the university enables students to pursue projects that require research outside the Washington, DC, area, including overseas. The university encourages faculty research on intelligence issues and supports intelligence-related research by faculty from other DoD Schools. Faculty and student research is published in academic journals and in book-length special studies. Research results and thesis abstracts are also made available to the Intelligence Community.

== Academic programs ==
- Bachelor of Science in Intelligence (BSI)
- Master of Science of Strategic Intelligence (MSSI)
- Master of Science and Technology Intelligence (MSTI)
- Certificate of Intelligence Studies (CIS)

== Admissions ==
All prospective NIU students must meet the following requirements:

- Be United States citizens who are members of the U.S. Armed Forces or are federal government employees
- Be nominated by their affiliated organization (full-time students only), and
- Possess a TS/SCI security clearance prior to enrollment

== Notable graduates and faculty ==
- Todd C. Chapman
- Mike Gallagher
- John R. Allen
- Paul M. Nakasone
- Robert B. Murrett
- Ronald D. Johnson
- Michael H. Decker
- William C. Smith Jr.
- David A. Reid
- Jeffrey A. Kruse
- Leah G. Lauderback
- Earl G. Matthews
- William J. Walker
- Robert P. Ashley Jr.
- Brent Scowcroft
- John Kimmons
- Brad Cooper

== Research and publications ==
As the dedicated research unit of NIU, the Ann Caracristi Institute for Intelligence Research (CIIR) represents the IC’s premier resource for academic intelligence research. CIIR serves to support, advance, and promote NIU’s academically rigorous research on topics critical to U.S. intelligence and national security.

- NI Press Publications
- Caracristi Monographs

== See also ==
- Joint European Union Intelligence School
- United States Intelligence Community
