= Intelligence Community Campus-Bethesda =

Offices for several agencies of the United States Intelligence Community

Coordinates: 38°57′00″N 77°07′21″W

The Intelligence Community Campus-Bethesda (ICC-B) is a campus in Brookmont, Maryland, containing offices for several agencies of the United States Intelligence Community. The campus was created in 1945 and initially served as the headquarters of the National Geospatial-Intelligence Agency and its predecessor organizations. In 2012, it was transferred to the Office of the Director of National Intelligence and substantially renovated into an architecturally and functionally modern design.

== Early history ==
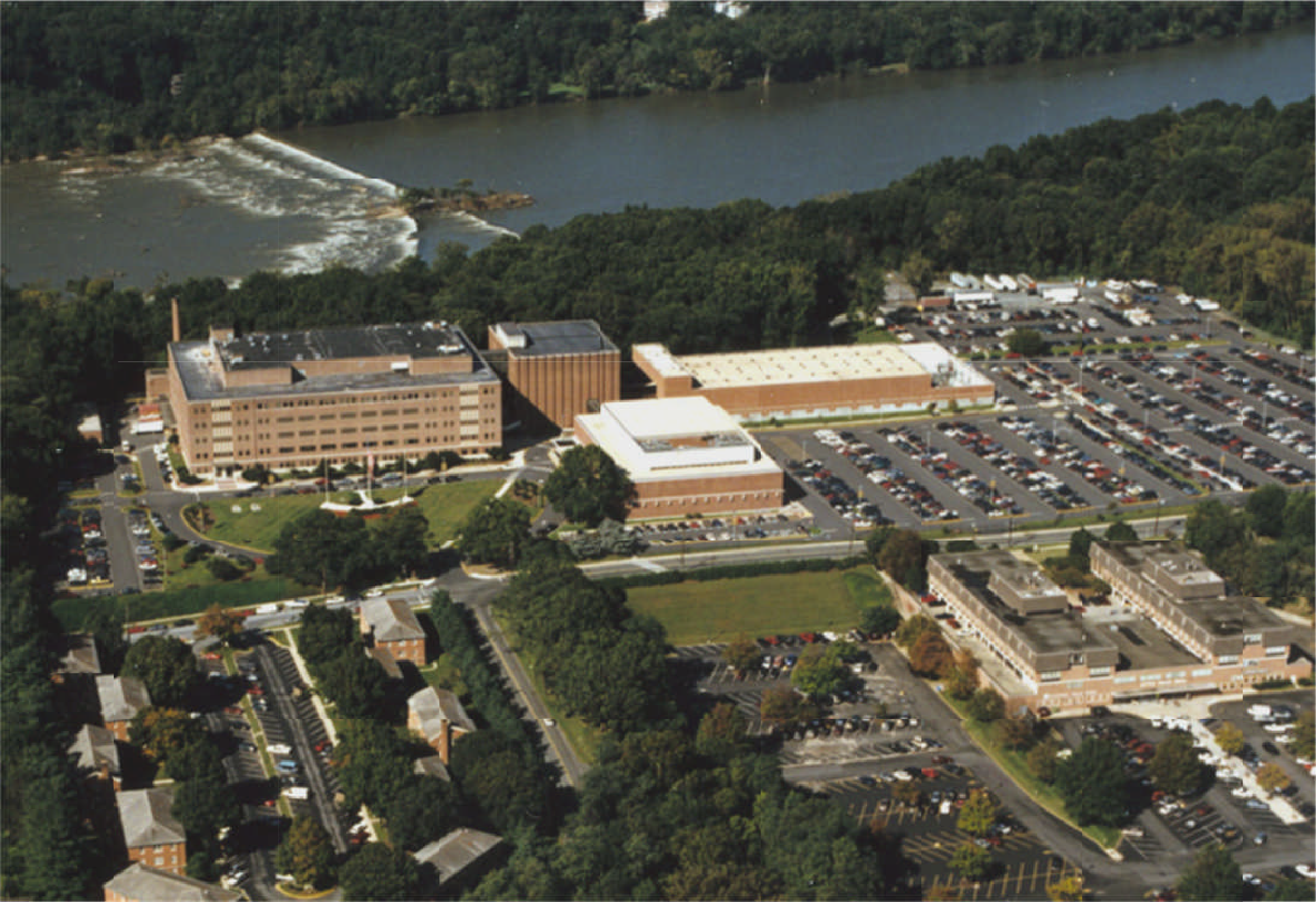
The site as National Geospatial-Intelligence Agency Headquarters prior to 2012. From the left, the visible buildings are Erskine, Abert, Roberdeau, and Maury Halls. The Emory Building is barely visible at the extreme left.

The campus sits on an approximately 30-acre parcel standing atop a 150-foot bluff overlooking the Potomac River. The campus sits on land that was once part of Fort Sumner--one of the ring forts built to defend D.C. during the Civil War. The land was acquired in 1945 by the government from a development firm in a condemnation action as an expansion of the Army Map Service's facilities adjacent to the Dalecarlia Reservoir. The facility served as headquarters of a succession of agencies: Army Map Service, U.S. Army Topographic Command, Defense Mapping Agency Hydrographic/Topographic Command, and National Geospatial-Intelligence Agency (NGA).

Erskine Hall, named for Robert Erskine, was completed in 1946 as a five-story brick building with an array of three flagpoles on a semicircular lawn to the east. Abert Hall, named for John James Abert, was constructed in 1962. It was a five-story concrete and brick building with no windows on the upper three floors to aid in classified work. The Emory Building, a two-story brick building named after William H. Emory, was constructed in 1963. Roberdeau Hall, named after Isaac Roberdeau, was constructed in 1966 as two-story brick building with no windows. Maury Hall, named for Matthew Fontaine Maury, was constructed in 1988 as a three-story building with no windows. In 2004 the land was administratively part of Fort Myer.

In 2004, Erskine Hall and the flagpoles were named as part of the Army Map Service Historic District by Maryland Historical Trust and determined to be eligible for listing in the National Register of Historic Places.

== Renovation ==
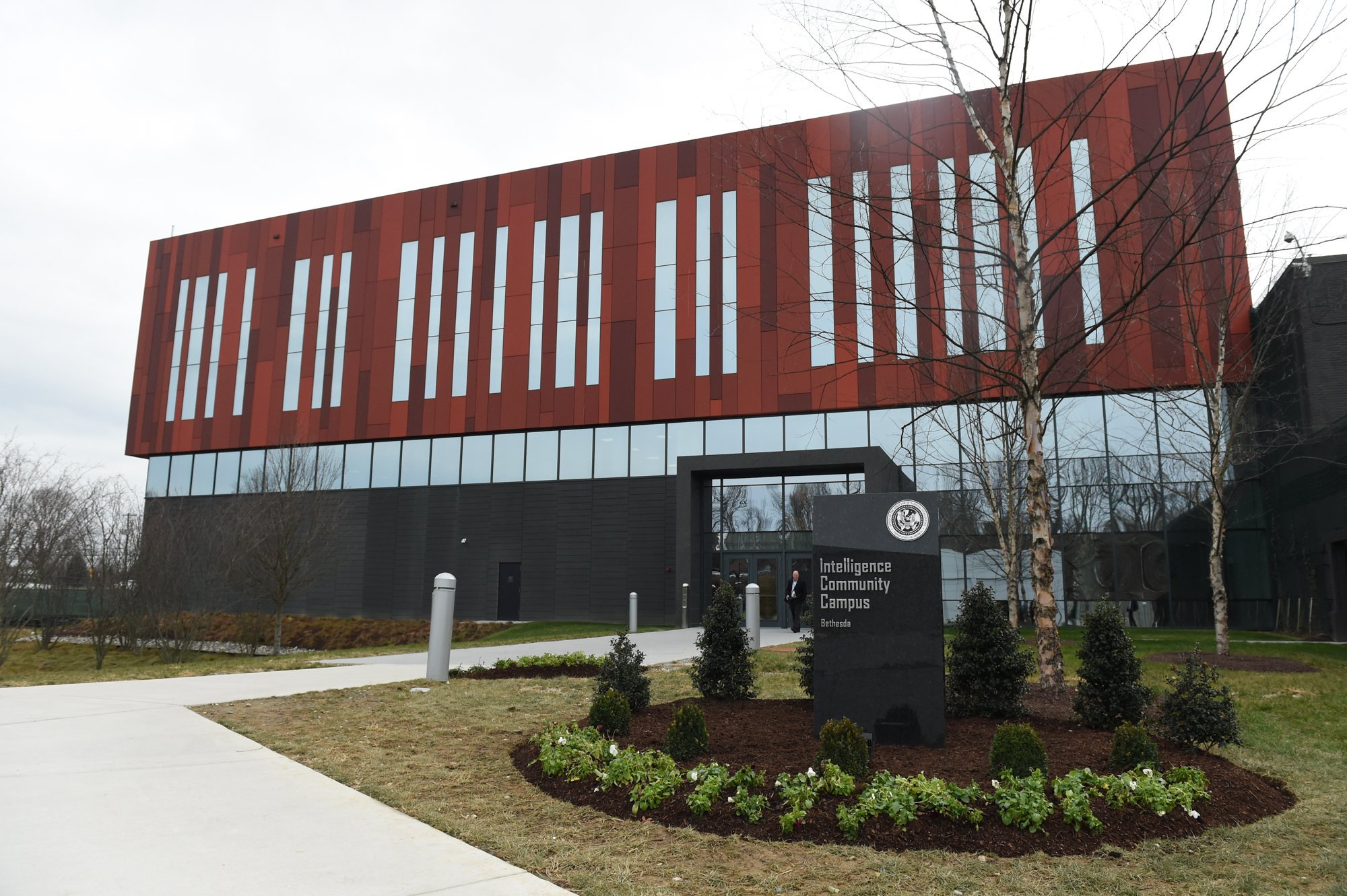
A building of the renovated campus in 2017

As a result of the 2005 Base Realignment and Closure Commission process, NGA moved to a new facility in Fort Belvoir North Area near Springfield, Virginia. Originally, the General Services Administration and then the Navy planned to relocate functions there, but the campus was transferred to the Office of the Director of National Intelligence in 2012.

The renovation involved demolishing Abert Hall and Emory Hall, constructing a new Centrum building that connected and integrated the remaining three buildings, and replacing the facades of the existing buildings with a modern design of glass and red-hued metal panels. The interiors were remodeled into open, light-filled workspaces. Additionally, 20 acres of paved surface parking lot were removed and replaced with a new six-story garage. The renovation cost 60% less than completely new construction would have.

The architect for the renovation was Leo A. Daly, LLC. The goal of the renovation was to create a shared space between all 17 agencies of the United States Intelligence Community, reflecting a call for increased collaboration between them by the 9/11 Commission. The campus was built to the LEED Silver certification, with attention given to energy efficiency including the use of LED lighting and solar panels; the renovated campus used 31% less energy than before. The new campus won awards from Building Design+Construction, as well as the Design-Build Institute of America and the U.S. Green Building Council National Capital Area.

A ribbon-cutting ceremony was held on October 8, 2015. As of 2015, the campus contained offices for about 3,000 employees of the National Counterintelligence and Security Center, National Intelligence University, and Defense Intelligence Agency.

In October 2019, a Wall of Spies Experience museum was opened within the facility, depicting 135 spies such as Benedict Arnold, Aldrich Ames, Robert Hanssen, and Edward Snowden, as well as historical artifacts related to spying. Although the physical museum is not open to the public, a website version was developed for public consumption.
