= Military Intelligence Board =

American military intelligence organization

The Military Intelligence Board (MIB) serves as the senior-level board for coordination of intelligence assets in support of military operations globally within the United States government. The board is chaired by the Defense Intelligence Agency, a component of the United States Department of Defense, and seeks consensus across commands, agencies, and services. It serves as a forum to discuss any intelligence issues related to the military.

During combat operations, the MIB meets almost daily to address and coordinate intelligence analysis, assets, collection, systems, and personnel.

The MIB consists of the following members:

Principal Members:

- Director of the Defense Intelligence Agency (chair)
- Deputy Director of the Defense Intelligence Agency
- Director of the National Security Agency
- Joint Staff J-2
- Deputy Chief of Staff, G-2, US Army
- Director of Naval Intelligence
- HQ, US Air Force, Director of Intelligence, Surveillance and Reconnaissance
- Director of Intelligence, HQ US Marine Corps
- Director, National Geospatial-Intelligence Agency

Associated members:

- Unified Combatant Command, J-2s
- Director of the National Reconnaissance Office
- Director, Policy Staff, Defense Intelligence Agency
- Deputy Assistant Secretary of Defense for Intelligence and Security
- Undersecretary of Defense for Intelligence
- Assistant Commandant for Intelligence and Criminal Investigations, US Coast Guard
- Joint Staff, J-3
- Director, Directorate of Military Intelligence Staff
- Defense Intelligence Functional Manager for Collection
- Assistant, Deputy Director for Military Support, Central Intelligence Agency
- Director, Defense Information Systems Agency

== See also ==
- National Intelligence Council
- Director of National Intelligence
