= James H. Adams III =

U.S. Marine Corps general officer

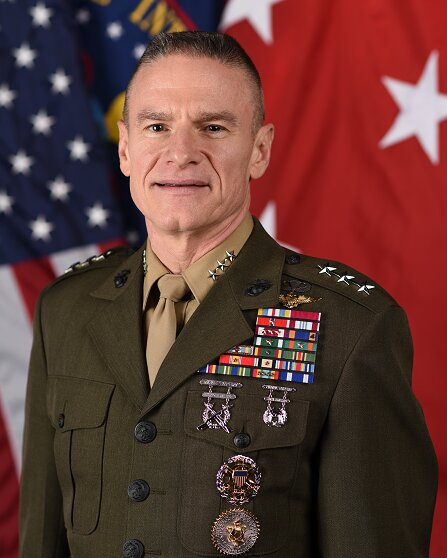
- Official portrait, 2026
- Born: 30 April 1968 (age 58)
- Children: Jessica • Jake • John
- Military career
- Allegiance: United States
- Branch: United States Marine Corps
- Service years: 1991–present
- Rank: Lieutenant General
- Commands: Defense Intelligence Agency; MAWTS-1; HMLA-367
- Awards: Legion of Merit

James H. Adams III (born 30 April 1968) is a United States Marine Corps lieutenant general who has served as the director of the Defense Intelligence Agency since February 13, 2026. He previously served as deputy commandant for programs and resources of the Marine Corps. He previously served as the deputy director for requirements and capability development of the Joint Staff.

In July, Adams was nominated for promotion to lieutenant general and assignment as deputy commandant for programs and resources of the Marine Corps.

LtGen Adams was nominated to lead the Defense Intelligence Agency. Adams was confirmed and assumed the role of Director of the Defense Intelligence Agency on 13 February 2026.

== Marine Corps Deployments and Commands ==
Adams has flown more than 3,300 hours in the AH-1W Super Cobra, including over 300 combat flight hours. He has made amphibious deployments with a Marine Expeditionary Unit and deployed multiples times to Iraq and Afghanistan. As a Lieutenant Colonel, Adams commanded Marine Light Attack Helicopter Squadron 367 (HMLA-367) and as a Colonel he commanded Marine Aviation Weapons and Tactics Squadron One (MAWTS-1) of the United States Marine Corps Training and Education Command.

== Education ==
Naval Academy, BS in Computer Science, 1991.

Joint Advanced Warfighting School, MS in Joint Campaign Planning and Strategy, 2010.

Harvard Business School, Advanced Management Program, 2016.

Harvard Kennedy School, Cyber Policy Course, 2020.

== Awards ==
Adams personal decorations include the Legion of Merit, Bronze Star, the Defense Meritorious Service Medal, the Meritorious Service Medal, the Air Medal, the Navy Commendation Medal, the Navy and Marine Corps Achievement Medal, the Iraqi Campaign Medal, the Global War on Terror Expeditionary Medal, the Global War on Terror Service Medal, and the Korean Defense Service Medal.

Military offices
Preceded by Lance K. Landrum	Deputy Director for Requirements and Capability Development of the Joint Staff; 2020–2023	Succeeded by Matthew T. Mowery
Preceded by Christopher J. Mahoney	Deputy Commandant for Programs and Resources of the United States Marine Corps; 2023–2026	Vacant
Preceded by Jeffrey A. Kruse	Director of the Defense Intelligence Agency; 2026–present	Incumbent
