= Director of the Defense Intelligence Agency =

Head of the U.S. Defense Intelligence Agency

- Seal of the Defense Intelligence Agency

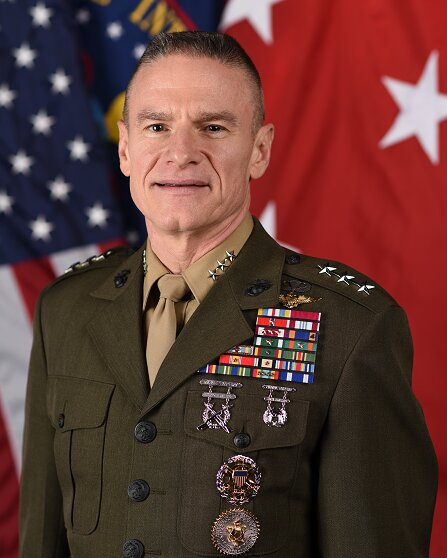
- Incumbent; Lieutenant General; James H. Adams III since 13 February 2026
- Defense Intelligence Agency
- Reports to: Under Secretary of Defense for Intelligence
- Appointer: President of the United States
- Formation: October 1961
- Website: DIA.mil

The director of the United States Defense Intelligence Agency is a military officer who, upon nomination by the president of the United States and confirmation by the Senate, serves as the United States' highest-ranking military intelligence officer. As the head of the Defense Intelligence Agency, the director is the principal intelligence adviser to the secretary of defense and the chairman of the Joint Chiefs of Staff. The director also reports to the director of national intelligence, via the civilian under secretary of defense for intelligence. Additionally, the director chairs the Military Intelligence Board, which coordinates activities of the entire defense intelligence community.

The office of DIA Director is rotated between three-star Army, Navy, Air Force, and Marine Corps officers generally every three years.

== Line of succession ==
In a June 2017 Action Memo, a line of succession was established for the position of Director should the sitting Director become incapacitated by death, resignation, or inability to perform the functions and duties of the office. In descending order the following DIA officials serve in the line of succession:

1. Deputy Director
2. Chief of Staff
3. Director for Mission Services
4. Director for Operations
5. Director for Analysis
6. Director for Science and Technology

== List of DIA directors ==
No.	Director	Photo	Term	Duration	Service	President(s) served under
1		Lieutenant General; Joseph Carroll	October 1961 – September 1969	7 years, 11 months	U.S. Air Force	John F. Kennedy; Lyndon B. Johnson
2		Lieutenant General; Donald V. Bennett	September 1969 – August 1972	2 years, 11 months	U.S. Army	Richard Nixon
3		Vice Admiral; Vincent P. de Poix	August 1972 – September 1974	2 years, 1 month	U.S. Navy	Richard Nixon; Gerald Ford
4		Lieutenant General; Daniel O. Graham	September 1974 – December 1975	1 year, 3 months	U.S. Army	Gerald Ford
5		Lieutenant General; Samuel V. Wilson	May 1976 – August 1977	1 year, 3 months	U.S. Army	Gerald Ford; Jimmy Carter
6		Lieutenant General; Eugene F. Tighe	September 1977 – August 1981	3 years, 11 months	U.S. Air Force	Jimmy Carter; Ronald Reagan
7		Lieutenant General; James A. Williams	September 1981 – September 1985	4 years	U.S. Army	Ronald Reagan
8		Lieutenant General; Leonard H. Perroots	October 1985 – December 1988	3 years, 2 months	U.S. Air Force	Ronald Reagan
9		Lieutenant General; Harry E. Soyster	December 1988 – September 1991	2 years, 9 months	U.S. Army	Ronald Reagan; George H. W. Bush
—		Dennis M. Nagy; Acting	September 1991 – November 1991	2 months	U.S. Senior; Executive Service	George H. W. Bush
10		Lieutenant General; James R. Clapper	November 1991 – August 1995	3 years, 9 months	U.S. Air Force	George H. W. Bush; Bill Clinton
11		Lieutenant General; Kenneth Minihan	August 1995 – February 16, 1996	7 months	U.S. Air Force	Bill Clinton
12		Lieutenant General; Patrick M. Hughes	February 16, 1996 – July 27, 1999	3 years, 5 months	U.S. Army	Bill Clinton
13		Vice Admiral; Thomas R. Wilson	July 27, 1999 – July 2002	3 years	U.S. Navy	Bill Clinton; George W. Bush
14		Vice Admiral; Lowell E. Jacoby	July 2002 – November 4, 2005	3 years, 4 months	U.S. Navy	George W. Bush
15		Lieutenant General; Michael D. Maples	November 4, 2005 – March 18, 2009	3 years, 4 months	U.S. Army	George W. Bush; Barack Obama
16		Lieutenant General; Ronald Burgess	March 18, 2009 – July 24, 2012	3 years, 4 months	U.S. Army	Barack Obama
17		Lieutenant General; Michael T. Flynn	July 24, 2012 – August 7, 2014	2 years, 2 weeks	U.S. Army	Barack Obama
—		David Shedd; Acting	August 7, 2014 – January 23, 2015	5 months	U.S. Senior; Executive Service	Barack Obama
18		Lieutenant General; Vincent R. Stewart	January 23, 2015 – October 3, 2017	2 years, 253 days	U.S. Marine Corps	Barack Obama; Donald Trump
19		Lieutenant General; Robert P. Ashley Jr.	October 3, 2017 – October 1, 2020	2 years, 364 days	U.S. Army	Donald Trump
20		Lieutenant General; Scott D. Berrier	October 1, 2020 – February 2, 2024	3 years, 124 days	U.S. Army	Donald Trump; Joe Biden
21		Lieutenant General; Jeffrey A. Kruse	February 2, 2024 – August 22, 2025	1 year, 201 days	U.S. Air Force	Joe Biden; Donald Trump
—		Major General; Constantin E. Nicolet	August 22, 2025 – February 13, 2026	175 days	U.S. Army	Donald Trump
22		Lieutenant General; James H. Adams III	February 13, 2026 – present	206 days	U.S. Marine Corps	Donald Trump
