= Jeffrey A. Kruse =

U.S. Air Force Lieutenant general

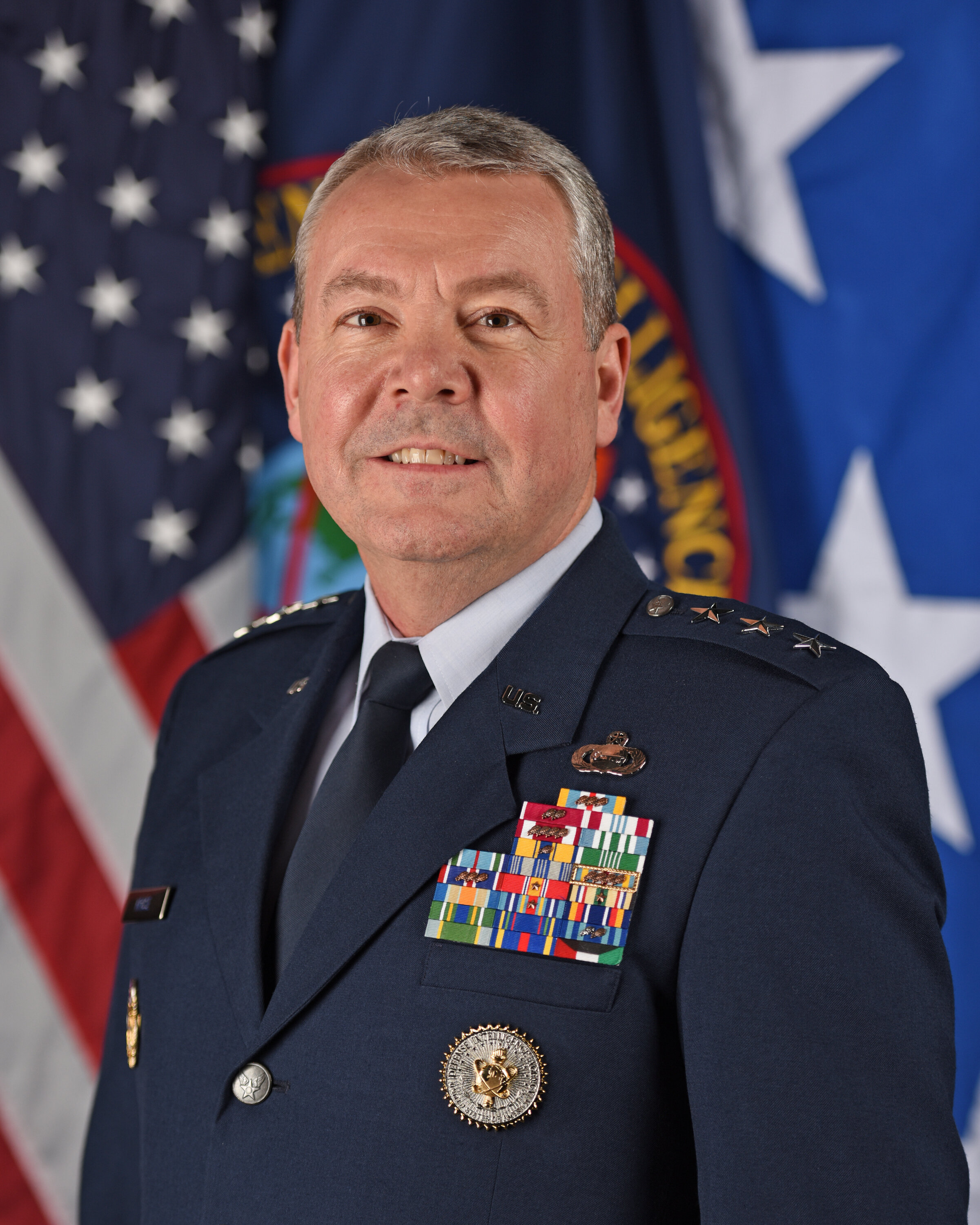
- Military career
- Allegiance: United States
- Branch: United States Air Force
- Service years: 1990−2025
- Rank: Lieutenant General
- Commands: Defense Intelligence Agency; 480th Intelligence, Surveillance and Reconnaissance Wing; 361st Intelligence, Surveillance and Reconnaissance Group; Pacific Air Forces Air Intelligence Squadron
- Conflicts: Gulf War
- Awards: Defense Superior Service Medal (4); Legion of Merit (3)

Jeffrey A. Kruse is a retired United States Air Force lieutenant general who served as the director of the Defense Intelligence Agency from 2 February 2024 to 22 August 2025. He served as the director of intelligence of the United States Indo-Pacific Command from July 2016 to July 2019, and was Director for Defense Intelligence (Warfighter Support) of the Office of the Under Secretary of Defense (Intelligence) from July 2019 to August 2020.

In July 2020, Kruse was nominated for promotion to lieutenant general and assignment as the director's advisor for military affairs of the Office of the Director of National Intelligence, a new office in the agency. He assumed this position on 16 August 2020, and held it until January 2024.

== Director of the Defense Intelligence Agency ==
In June 2023, Kruse was appointed by President Joe Biden as the next director of the Defense Intelligence Agency. On 11 December 2023, Kruse’s appointment as the new director of the Defense Intelligence Agency was confirmed by the United States Senate. On 2 February 2024, Kruse officially assumed the position as Director of the Defense Intelligence Agency.

On 18 March 2024, Kruse testified on Senate Intelligence community along with another head of United States Intelligence Community regarding the annual threat assessment. Secretary of Defense Pete Hegseth fired him in August 2025 after Kruse had suggested that U.S. attacks on Iran’s nuclear facilities had been ineffective, and his report was leaked to the press.

== Effective dates of promotions ==
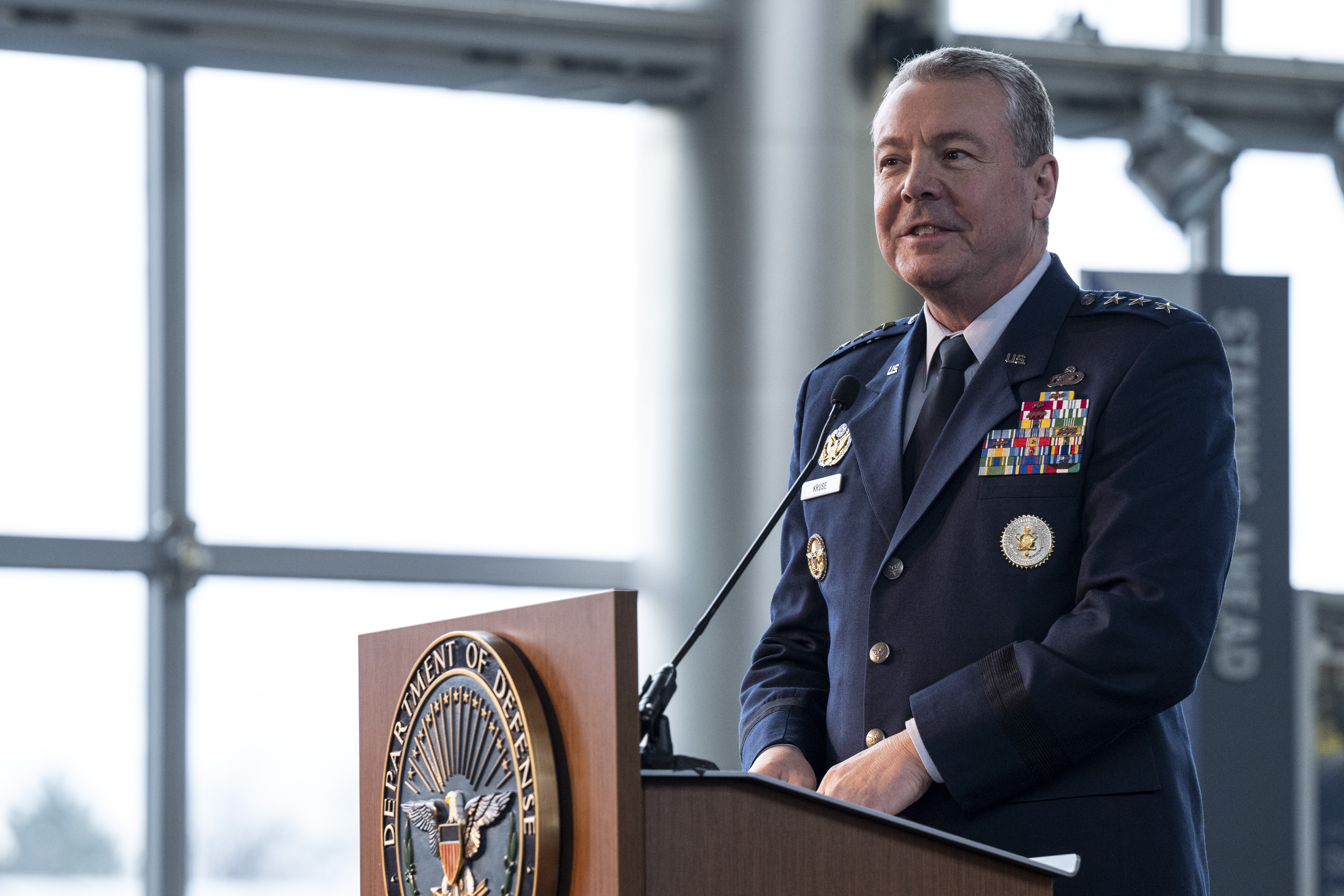
Lieutenant General Jeffrey A. Kruse upon assuming the position as Director of the Defense Intelligence Agency on 2 February 2024

Rank	Date
Second Lieutenant	16 December 1990
First Lieutenant	16 December 1992
Captain	16 December 1994
Major	1 January 2002
Lieutenant Colonel	1 May 2005
Colonel	1 October 2008
Brigadier General	8 June 2015
Major General	24 July 2018
Lieutenant General	16 August 2020

Military offices
Preceded by Paul D. Nelson	Commander of 480th Intelligence, Surveillance and Reconnaissance Wing; 2012–2014	Succeeded by Timothy D. Haugh
Preceded by ???	Director of Intelligence of Combined Joint Task Force – Operation Inherent Resolve; 2015–2016	Succeeded by Karen H. Gibson
Preceded by Timothy J. White	Director of Intelligence of the United States Indo-Pacific Command; 2016–2019	Succeeded by Michael Studeman
Preceded by John N.T. Shanahan	Director of Defense Intelligence for Warfighter Support of the Office of the Undersecretary of Defense for Intelligence & Security; 2019–2020	Succeeded by ???
New office	Advisor for Military Affairs to the Director of National Intelligence; 2020–2024	Succeeded by Michele H. Bredenkamp
Preceded by Scott D. Berrier	Director of the Defense Intelligence Agency; 2024–2025	Succeeded by James H. Adams III
