= Shamila N. Chaudhary =

American government official

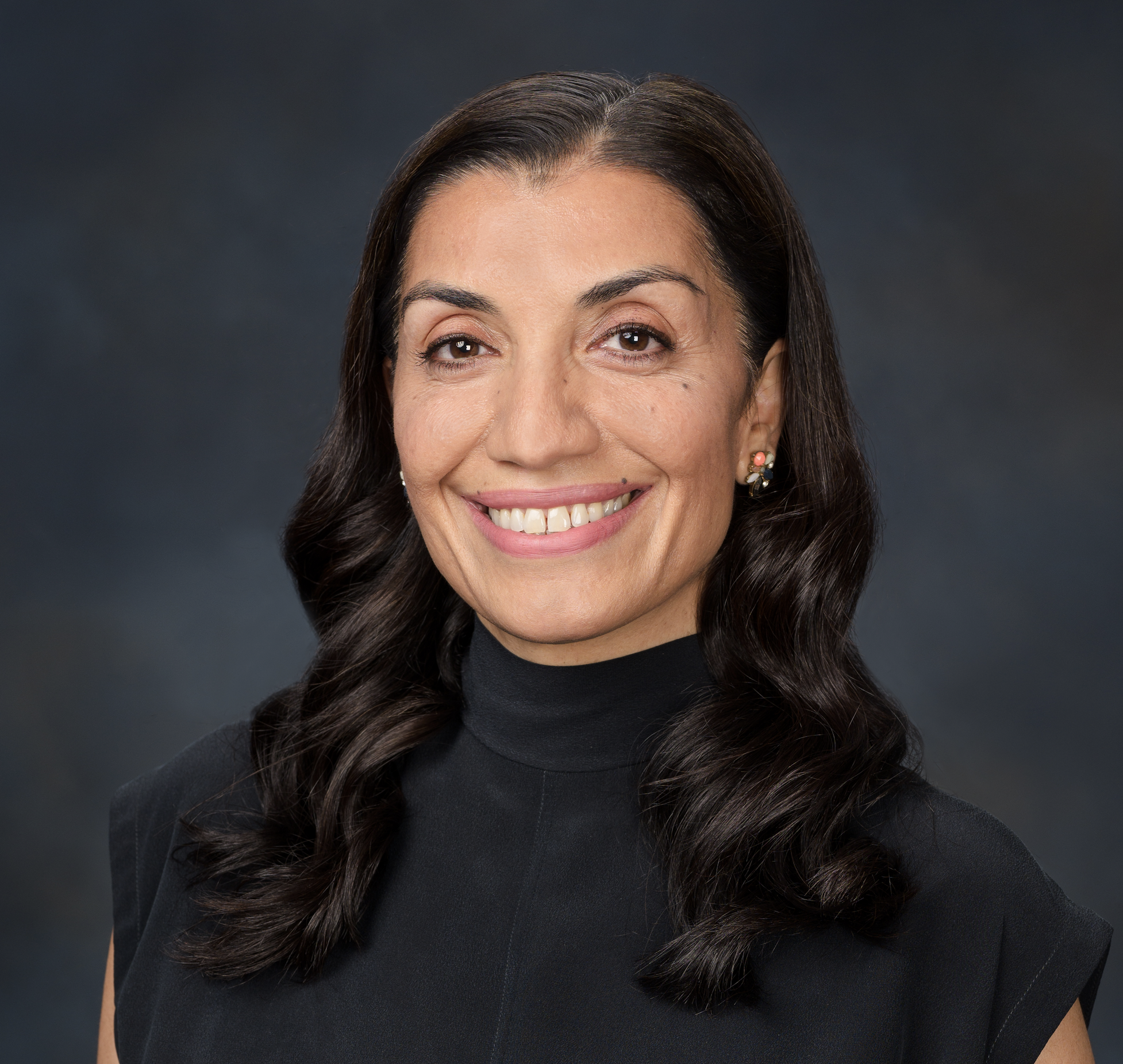
- Shamila Chaudhary 2023
- Born: Punjab, Pakistan
- Education: American University School of International Service, MA; University of Toledo, BA
- Occupation: National security scholar
- Years active: 1999–present
- Known for: Foreign policy expert

Shamila N. Chaudhary is an American foreign policy expert and academic who is the Senior South Asia Fellow at New America and senior advisor to Dean Vali Nasr at the Johns Hopkins University School of Advanced International Studies. She specializes in U.S. counterterrorism and national security issues, U.S.-Pakistan relations, Pakistan internal politics, and regional issues in South Asia.

== Public service career ==
Chaudhary worked on democracy and governance issues at the U.S. Agency for International Development from 2000 until 2004. She then served on the State Department’s Pakistan desk from 2007 until 2009 and covered economic, humanitarian response, and development issues on the Indonesia desk between 2004 and 2007. Chaudhary rose through the ranks at the State Department after impressing Secretary Hillary Clinton with her knowledge and outspoken nature during a briefing.

Chaudhary then served as a member of the Secretary of State's Policy Planning Staff and as a senior adviser to special representative to Afghanistan and Pakistan Richard Holbrooke, beginning in February 2009.

From April 2010 until July 2011, she worked as Pakistan director at the National Security Council. After leaving government service, Chaudhary worked on Pakistan, Afghanistan, and Sri Lanka at the political risk consulting firm Eurasia Group from 2011 until 2013.

== Writing ==
Chaudhary's writings cover United States foreign policy, counterterrorism, and national security issues in South Asia in addition to other diverse topics such as energy policy and feminism, and national identity. She is a frequent contributor to Foreign Policy and her work has also been featured in The Washington Post, Current History, The Daily Beast, and the BBC.

Chaudhary earned an MA in international affairs from the American University School of International Service and a BA in English literature and women’s studies from the University of Toledo. She was a 1999 David L. Boren National Security Education Program (NSEP) Fellow and studied Urdu in Lahore, Pakistan as part of her fellowship.

Chaudhary and her husband established the Chaudhary-Steinitz Research grant at University of Toledo to support undergraduate students studying issues related to Pakistan.
