= Colin F. Jackson =

Colin F. Jackson is the chairman of the Strategic and Operational Research Department (SORD) at the U.S. Naval War College. In this role, he oversees several research groups, including the China Maritime Studies Institute (CMSI), the Russia Maritime Studies Institute (RMSI), the Advanced Research Programs (Halsey A, Halsey B, Gravely, and Holloway), the Cyber and Innovation Policy Institute (CIPI), and the Brodie Group.

== Early life and education ==
Jackson grew up in the San Francisco Bay Area. He holds degrees from Princeton University (BA, 1992), Johns Hopkins School of Advanced International Studies (MA, 1999), the University of Pennsylvania's Wharton School (MBA, 1999), and the Massachusetts Institute of Technology (PhD, 2008).

== Career ==
From 2006 to 2017, Jackson was a professor in the Strategy Department and later director of the Advanced Strategist Program. He also taught courses in strategy and counterinsurgency at MIT and Columbia.

In 2009, he served as a senior civilian adviser to Task Force Mountain Warrior in Jalalabad, Afghanistan.

From 2017 to 2019, Jackson served as deputy United States assistant secretary of defense for Afghanistan, Pakistan, and Central Asia. In this role, he oversaw all U.S. defense policy in the region, including strategy formulation, security cooperation, budget oversight, and contingency planning.

Jackson served as the senior Department of Defense official at the U.S.–Taliban peace talks. In 2020, he delivered testimony to the Senate Armed Services Committee regarding peace talks with the Taliban in Afghanistan.

In April 2022, Jackson was appointed by the Senate Armed Services Committee to serve as a member of the Afghanistan War Commission, a bipartisan commission designed to study the entirety of U.S. military operations in Afghanistan from 2001 to 2021.

== Military service ==
In 2011, he deployed in uniform to Afghanistan as executive officer for policy planning for the deputy chief of staff, operations, USFOR-A. Jackson is currently a lieutenant colonel in the United States Army Reserve, serving with a unit based at Fort Devens, Massachusetts.

== Personal life ==
Jackson lives on Aquidneck Island with his wife and family. He has three children.
