= Cornelius Smith =

Cornelius Smith may refer to:

- Cornelius A. Smith (born 1937), Bahamian politician and diplomat, governor-general of the Bahamas
- Cornelius C. Smith (1869–1936), American officer in the U.S. Army
- Cornelius Cole Smith Jr. (1913–2004), American author and military historian
- Cornelius Smith Jr. (born 1982), American actor
