= Cornelius Cole Smith Jr. =

United States Marine officer, military historian and biographer

- Born: July 18, 1913; Fort Huachuca, Arizona, U.S.
- Died: April 27, 2004 (aged 90); Riverside, California, U.S.
- Burial place: Evergreen Memorial Park
- Relatives: Granville Henderson Oury (great-granduncle); William Sanders Oury (great-grandfather); Gilbert Cole Smith (grandfather); Cornelius Cole Smith, Sr. (father)
- Military career
- Allegiance: United States of America
- Branch: United States Marines
- Service years: 1937–1947
- Rank: Colonel
- Nickname: Corney
- Conflicts: World War II
- Other work: Military historian and biographer

Cornelius Cole "Corney" Smith Jr. (July 18, 1913 – April 27, 2004) was an American author, military historian, illustrator and painter. A survivor of the Japanese attack on Pearl Harbor, he was an officer in the United States Marines during World War II and retired at the rank of colonel. After leaving military service in 1947, he held a number of important positions including his employment as an architect for the Arabian-American Oil Company and a museum curator for the Scripps Institution of Oceanography. After receiving his MA and Ph.D. degrees in history at Claremont Graduate School, he spent the 1950s as chief of the Historical Division for the 15th Air Force, Strategic Air Command.

He began his writing career relatively late in life, at age 57, and was a prolific author of books on military history and the American frontier of the Southwestern United States. In addition to his own father's biography, Don't Settle for Second: Life and Times of Cornelius C. Smith (1977), he also authored biographies on Arizona frontiersman William Sanders Oury and Russian soldier-of-fortune Emilio Kosterlitzky. His book A Southwestern Vocabulary: The Words They Used (1984) detailed over 500 terms of slang of the American Southwest and Northern Mexico and is widely cited by historians of the "Old West".

== Early life ==
Cornelius Cole Smith Jr. was born at Fort Huachuca in Arizona on July 18, 1913. His father, Cornelius Cole Smith Sr., was commanding officer of the 5th U.S. Cavalry at the time of his birth and had served as a colonel in the Philippines during the Philippine Insurrection and Moro Rebellion. Smith came from a prominent military family whose lineage could be traced as far back as the American Revolutionary War; his grandfather, Gilbert Cole Smith, had served an officer in the Union Army's famed California Column during the American Civil War and was also a direct descendant of brothers Granville and William Sanders Oury, William being one of couriers sent out by Colonel William B. Travis' during the Siege of the Alamo.

His early life growing up on the frontier military post was described by childhood friend H. B. Wharfield in his 1968 book Fort Yuma on the Colorado River,

Dr. Cornelius C. Smith Jr. was a small boy with the family at Fort Huachuca, Arizona during the period his father commanded the Tenth. He had been born there in 1913 when his father was at the post with the 5th US Cavalry. The older brother, Graham, frequently took horseback rides around the military reservation with a young officer, Lieutenant Marcus E. Jones, and me, and on occasions practiced polo with us. We tolerated the little fellow, Corney, who sometimes tried to tag along on his pony.

A few years following his father's retirement from the military, he and his family moved to Riverside, California, in 1930, where they lived in the historic Victorian Charles E. Packard House; the home remained in the Smith family for over 30 years before Cornelius Jr. sold it in 1963. Cornelius Smith Jr. graduated from Riverside Polytechnic High School the following year. He briefly attended Riverside City College where he earned a track scholarship to the University of Southern California, and graduated in 1937.

== Military service during World War II ==
"...the bombs are falling. They whistle to earth with ear-shattering explosions. You can see the morning sunlight glisten on the bombs as they fall - silvery flashed like trout or mackerel jumping out of the water. Who said the Japs were cross-eyed, second-rate pilots who couldn't hit the broad side of a barn door? Maybe so, but I'm standing on our Navy Yard parade ground looking up at them, while they're making a sandpile out of the yard. They're kicking the hell out of Pearl Harbor, and it's enough to turn your stomach."

— Smith describing the attack on Pearl Harbor.

The year of his college graduation, Smith became a commissioned officer in the Marine Corps Reserve as a second lieutenant. He was present at the Japanese sneak attack on Pearl Harbor on December 7, 1941, where he was serving as officer of the day at the Marine barracks in the Pearl Harbor Navy Yard. He was initially alerted of the attack by the officer of the guard, Second Lieutenant Arnold D. Swartz, while drinking coffee with Marine Gunner Floyd McCorkle in the officers' section of the mess hall. As "sharp blasts" began shaking the building, the three men ran out onto the lanai where they witnessed the first Japanese naval planes diving on Ford Island.

During the attack, he led a four-man rescue party which pulled between fifteen and twenty sailors from oil-soaked and burning water; he modestly recounted his actions in later years saying only that his rescue party did "pretty good". He searched in vain among the wounded and dying at the Naval Hospital for his friend Harry Gaver Jr., son of Black-Foxe Military Institute commandant Major Harry Gaver, who had been killed on the USS Oklahoma earlier that morning. He later said, while standing among Marines firing at enemy planes flying over the Navy Yard, that "every Leatherneck's face wore a look of shame"; "Here we are with our pants down and the striking force of our Pacific Fleet is settling on the bottom of East Loch, Pearl Harbor. Who wouldn't be ashamed?" He wrote a personal account of the battle, based on his own wartime diary, for the Proceedings of the United States Naval Institute, "...A Hell of a Christmas," (December 1968) years later.

From May 1941 to October 1945, Smith served overseas and held commands at all levels from a platoon to a battalion. He spent much of his time in the Philippines where his father had served, as an officer with the 14th U.S. Cavalry, during the Philippine Insurrection and Moro Rebellion at the turn of the 20th century.

== Post-war life ==
In 1947, Smith retired from active duty at the rank of colonel and subsequently became an architect for the Arabian-American Oil Company. He also worked as a museum curator for the Scripps Institution of Oceanography. In the 1950s, after earning MA and Ph.D. degrees in history at Claremont Graduate School, he was appointed chief of the Historical Division for the 15th Air Force, Strategic Air Command. He authored his two books during this period, A Study of the Development of the Petroleum Industry in Saudi Arabia: Its Impact Upon the Economic and Social Patterns of That Country (1953) and United States Policy in Spain and the Mediterranean Area: An Analysis of the Economic and Military Agreements of 1953 (1955), the former partially based on his experiences employed by the Arabian-American Oil Company.

== Work as an historian ==
Smith began contributing to various historical publications, such as Montana: The Magazine of Western History, in the early-1960s and wrote his first book, Recuerdos de San Antonio: Four Memorable Days in the City of the Alamo, in 1964. He became a full-time author and illustrator three years later publishing a biography on his great-grandfather William Sanders Oury in William Sanders Oury: History-Maker of the Southwest (1967); the book was favorably reviewed by Frontier Times, a magazine his father had written articles for during the early 1930s. That same year, he was invited to speak at the Archives and State and Local History Round Table luncheon. Smith followed this with Emilio Kosterlitzky, Eagle of Sonora and the Southwest Border in 1970 and had his first poetry book, Wanderlust, published in 1974. As an artist Smith produced works painted primarily in watercolor.

In the mid-1970s, Smith returned to his childhood home of Fort Huachuca to serve as the post's centennial coordinator. Near the end of the decade, he wrote another series of books on the American frontier in the Southwest with a biography on his father, Don't Settle for Second: Life and Times of Cornelius C. Smith (1977), as well as Tanque Verde: The Story of a Frontier Ranch (1978) and Fort Huachuca: The Story of a Frontier Post (1978). His last such book, A Southwestern Vocabulary: The Words They Used (1984), described in detail the origins, meanings, and use of over 500 terms of historical slang of the American Southwest and Northern Mexico. Smith then moved on to writing about the local history of Riverside, California. His first effort was All Saints Episcopal Parish, Riverside, California: The First 100 Years, A Brief History (1984) and continued with Remembrance of Things Past (1991) and Corney's Mission Inn (1993).

== Later years ==
Though he and his wife, Grace Mantel Smith, had been stationed all across the country during his military career Smith always maintained a home in Riverside and eventually retired there. Since the 1960s, he had been an active musician and sang tenor for the Citrus Belt chapter of The Society for the Preservation and Encouragement of Barbershop Quartet Singing in America. His sister, Alice Smith Randolph, also sang at the Mission Inn. In his retirement years, he became known in the local community as a modern-day "renaissance man", focusing on sculptures and artwork, and had numerous one-man shows of his paintings and wood carvings. Two of his last books were related to his art and poetry, Full Circle: Poems & Drawings (1998) and Impressions ... of Places and Things (1999).

In October 2003, as one of the oldest residents in the city, he made a public appearance at Evergreen Memorial Park for a special ceremony to commemorate the restoration of his father's gravesite; this was part of an Eagle Scout project by 16-year-old Michael Emett to restore the dilapidated historical section of the cemetery. In an interview with The Press-Enterprise, he talked about his father, "I was always proud of him and I always looked up to him. He was a fine man. He was a great man."

Smith died of natural causes at his Riverside home on April 27, 2004, at the age of 90. A military service was held for him at Evergreen Memorial Park, where he was interred, as was a church service at All Saints Episcopal Church three and a half weeks later.

== Bibliography ==
- A Study of the Development of the Petroleum Industry in Saudi Arabia: Its Impact Upon the Economic and Social Patterns of That Country (1953)
- United States Policy in Spain and the Mediterranean Area: An Analysis of the Economic and Military Agreements of 1953 (1955)
- Recuerdos de San Antonio: Four Memorable Days in the City of the Alamo (1964)
- William Sanders Oury: History-Maker of the Southwest (1967)
- Emilio Kosterlitzky, Eagle of Sonora and the Southwest Border (1970)
- Wanderlust (1974)
- The Grunts (1976, illustrator)
- Don't Settle for Second: Life and Times of Cornelius C. Smith (1977)
- Tanque Verde: The Story of a Frontier Ranch (1978)
- Fort Huachuca: The Story of a Frontier Post (1978)
- A Southwestern Vocabulary: The Words They Used (1984)
- Those Who Were There: Eyewitness Accounts of the War in Southeast Asia, 1956–1975 & Aftermath (1984, illustrator)
- All Saints Episcopal Parish, Riverside, California: The First 100 Years, A Brief History (1984)
- Remembrance of Things Past (1991)
- Corney's Mission Inn (1993)
- Full Circle: Poems & Drawings (1998)
- Impressions ... of Places and Things (1999)
