= Cornelius C. Smith =

United States Army Medal of Honor recipient (1869–1936)

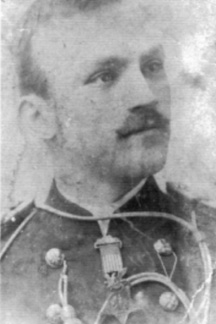
- Cornelius C. Smith displaying his Medal of Honor.
- Born: April 7, 1869; Tucson, Arizona Territory, United States
- Died: January 10, 1936 (aged 66); Riverside, California
- Burial place: Evergreen Memorial Park
- Relatives: Gilbert Cole Smith (father); Cornelius Cole Smith, Jr. (son)
- Military career
- Allegiance: United States of America
- Branch: United States Army
- Service years: 1889–1920
- Rank: Colonel
- Units: 4th U.S. Cavalry; 2nd U.S. Cavalry; 6th U.S. Cavalry
- Commands: Philippine Constabulary; 5th U.S. Cavalry; 10th U.S. Cavalry
- Conflicts: Indian Wars: Sioux Wars; Spanish–American War; Philippine Insurrection; World War I
- Awards: Medal of Honor

Colonel Cornelius Cole Smith (April 7, 1869 – January 10, 1936) was an American officer in the U.S. Army who served with the 6th U.S. Cavalry during the Sioux Wars. On January 1, 1891, he and four other cavalry troopers successfully defended a U.S. Army supply train from a force of 300 Sioux warriors at the White River in South Dakota, for which he received the Medal of Honor. He was the last man to receive the award in battle against the Sioux, and in a major Indian war.

In his later career, Smith served as an officer during the Spanish–American War and the subsequent Philippine Insurrection under Generals Leonard Wood and John J. Pershing. In 1910, he was appointed by Pershing as commander of the Philippine Constabulary and served at Fort Huachuca as commanding officer of Troop G, 5th U.S. Cavalry from 1912 to 1914. It was in this capacity that he accepted the surrender of Colonel Emilio Kosterlitzky, commander of Mexican federal forces at Sonora, on March 13, 1913. In 1918, he was appointed commander of Huachuca and the 10th U.S. Cavalry. Prior to his retirement, he also oversaw the construction of Camp Owen Beirne, adjacent to Fort Bliss, which served as the model for similar camps built following the end of World War I.

Smith's son, Cornelius Cole Smith, Jr., who also served as a colonel in the Philippines during World War II, was a successful author, historian and illustrator who wrote several books on the Southwestern United States including his biography entitled "Don't Settle for Second: Life and Times of Cornelius C. Smith" (1977).

== Biography ==
=== Early life ===
Cornelius Cole Smith was born on April 7, 1869, in the frontier town of Tucson in the Arizona Territory. his father, Gilbert Cole Smith, was a member of a distinguished military family dating back to the Revolutionary War. He had served as officer in the Union Army's famed California Column during the American Civil War and later became quartermaster at Fort Lowell in Tucson. He was also related to brothers William and Granville H. Oury. His family lived at several outposts in the Arizona and New Mexico Territories, wherever his father happened to be stationed. In December 1882, they finally settled at Vancouver Barracks in the Washington Territory. Smith was then sent back east to Louisiana, Missouri, and in 1884 to Baltimore, Maryland. In 1888, Smith moved to Helena, Montana and joined the Montana National Guard on May 22, 1889.

On April 9, 1890, at age 21, Smith enlisted in the United States Army in Helena and was immediately sent out with 6th U.S. Cavalry Regiment for frontier duty in the Dakota Territory.

=== Battle at White River, 1891 ===
Within a year, Smith reached the rank of corporal and saw his first action during the Pine Ridge Campaign. On January 1, 1891, two days after the Battle at Wounded Knee Creek, he accompanied a fifty-three man escort of a U.S. Army supply train to the regiment's camp at the battle site. While preparing to cross the White River, partially ice-covered during the winter, the supply train was suddenly attacked by a group of approximately 300 Sioux braves. In an attempt to save the wagon train, he and Sergeant Frederick Myers chose advanced positions from a knoll 300 yards from the river and held back the initial Sioux assault with four other troopers successfully defended their position against repeated enemy attacks. After they had withdrawn, Smith and the others chased after the war party for a considerable distance before breaking off their pursuit.

Smith's actions at White River prevented the Sioux from capturing the supply wagons. He was cited for distinguished bravery in the face of a numerically superior enemy force and received the Medal of Honor on February 4, 1891.

=== Service in Cuba and the Philippines, 1892–1912 ===
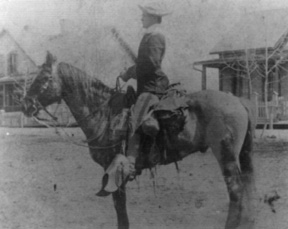
In 1895 Second Lieutenant Cornelius C. Smith, a Medal of Honor recipient, posed with his favorite horse, Blue, in front of his quarters.

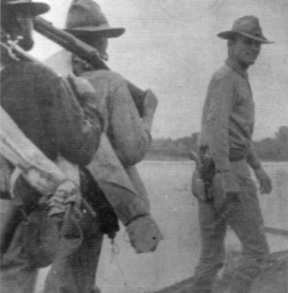
Smith as a captain with the 14th U.S. Cavalry in the Philippines during 1904.

The following year, on November 19, 1892, Smith was made a commissioned officer as a second lieutenant with the 2nd U.S. Cavalry. In 1898, he fought in Cuba during the Spanish–American War and in the Philippines during the Filipino and Moro Rebellions under Generals Leonard Wood and John J. Pershing respectively.

From 1903 to 1906, he served as captain with the 14th U.S. Cavalry, in Mindanao under General Wood, during which time he helped publish A Grammar of the Maguindanao Tongue According to the Manner of Speaking It in the Interior and on the South Coast of the Island of Mindanao (1906) with Spanish Jesuit Rev. Father Jacinto Juanmart.

In 1908, he accepted a two-year position as superintendent of California's Sequoia National Park and Grant National Parks. In 1910, he returned to the Philippine Islands for 2 years as commander of the Philippine Constabulary under General Pershing.

=== Fort Huachuca and World War I, 1912–1920 ===
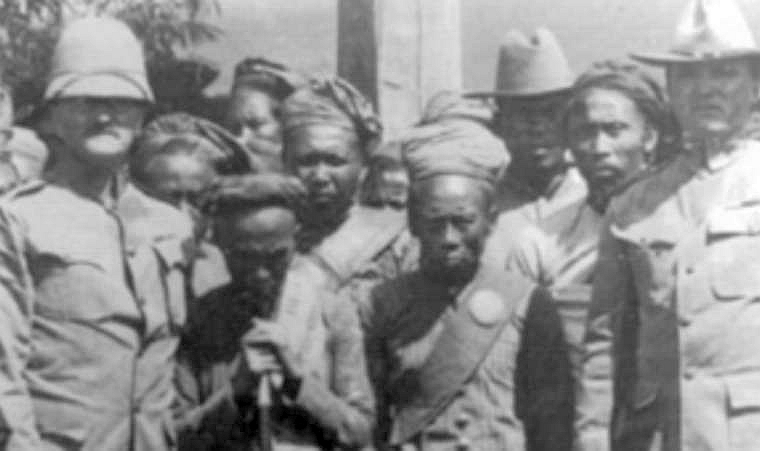
Smith (far right) as commander of the Philippine Constabulary with Brig. Gen. John J. Pershing and Moro chieftains in 1910. Smith participated in expeditions against the Moro rebels for much of his time in the Philippines.

After a nine-year tour of duty in the Philippines, Smith was brought back to the U.S. in 1912 and in fall transferred to the 4th U.S. Cavalry Regiment at Fort Huachuca in his home state of Arizona. From December 1912 to December 1914 he was reassigned to the 5th U.S. Cavalry as commanding officer of its Troop G at Huachuca, when the 4th U.S. Cavalry was sent for rotation to Hawaii. On March 13, 1913, he formally accepted the surrender of Colonel Emilio Kosterlitzky, commander of Mexican federal forces of Sonora and his 209 followers in Nogales, Arizona after General Álvaro Obregón had defeated him days earlier. The surrender was conducted in a formal ceremony, with Kosterlitzky presenting Smith his sword. The two officers later became lifelong friends.

During 1915, Smith was a military attaché in Bogotá and Caracas, and rose through the ranks from major to colonel of cavalry within the next two years. He trained several regiments during World War I, but was denied further promotion and a field command in Europe due to the feud between General Pershing, then commander-in-chief of the American Expeditionary Forces on the Western Front (World War I), and Army Chief-of-Staff Peyton March. In 1918, he returned to Fort Huachuca where he assumed command of the post and the 10th U.S. Cavalry Regiment. His last assignment was at Fort Bliss where he had Camp Owen Beirne built, the model for similar bases constructed for servicemen following World War I. He retired in 1920 at the rank of colonel.

=== Retirement and later years 1920–36 ===
Smith taught military science and tactics at the University of Arizona after leaving the U.S. Army and was later hired as a technical advisor for war films in Hollywood. In 1928, he became a member of the American Electoral Committee which oversaw the presidential elections in Nicaragua. That same year, he was also a contributing editor for Alice Baldwin's biography on her late husband Major General Frank Baldwin, Memoirs of the late Frank D. Baldwin, Major General, U.S.A., in which Smith related his experiences with Baldwin during the Spanish–American War. He went on to become a prolific author of articles relating to the American frontier in the Southwestern United States.

Smith died in Riverside, California on January 10, 1936, at the age of 66. He is buried at Evergreen Memorial Park and Mausoleum, along with 1,000 other veterans.

=== Personal life ===
Smith was married; His son Cornelius Cole Smith Jr. was born 1913 at Fort Huachuca.

He was a hereditary companion of the Military Order of the Loyal Legion of the United States.

== Grave site restoration ==
In November 2003, a special ceremony was held at Smith's grave site to display a new 18-foot-tall flagpole and stone bench nearby. Smith's son, Cornelius Cole Smith, Jr., was in attendance. Initially started by 16-year-old Michael Emett for an Eagle Scout project, this was the first of a planned restoration campaign for the graves of Riverside's military veterans and town founders. The story was covered by The Press-Enterprise and encouraged community leaders to raise money for an endowment to provide for the upkeep of older rundown areas of the cemetery that are not watered or maintained. A few years before, the California Department of Consumer Affairs ordered that sprinklers in the historic section be shut off because it lacked an endowment to pay for the water.

== Medal of Honor citation ==
Rank and organization: Corporal, Company K, 6th U.S. Cavalry. Place and date: Near White River, S. Dak., 1 January 1891. Entered service at: Helena, Mont. Birth: Tucson, Ariz. Date of issue: 4 February 1891.

Citation:

With 4 men of his troop drove off a superior force of the enemy and held his position against their repeated efforts to recapture it, and subsequently pursued them a great distance.

== Bibliography ==
=== Books ===
- A Grammar of the Maguindanao Tongue According to the Manner of Speaking It in the Interior and on the South Coast of the Island of Mindanao (1906, contributing editor with Jacinto Juanmart)
- Memoirs of the late Frank D. Baldwin, Major General, U.S.A. (1928, contributing editor with Alice B. Baldwin)

=== Articles ===
- Old Military Forts of the Southwest (1930)
- Some Unpublished History of the Southwest (1931)

== See also ==
- List of Medal of Honor recipients for the Indian Wars
