= National Security Space Association =

American lobbying organization

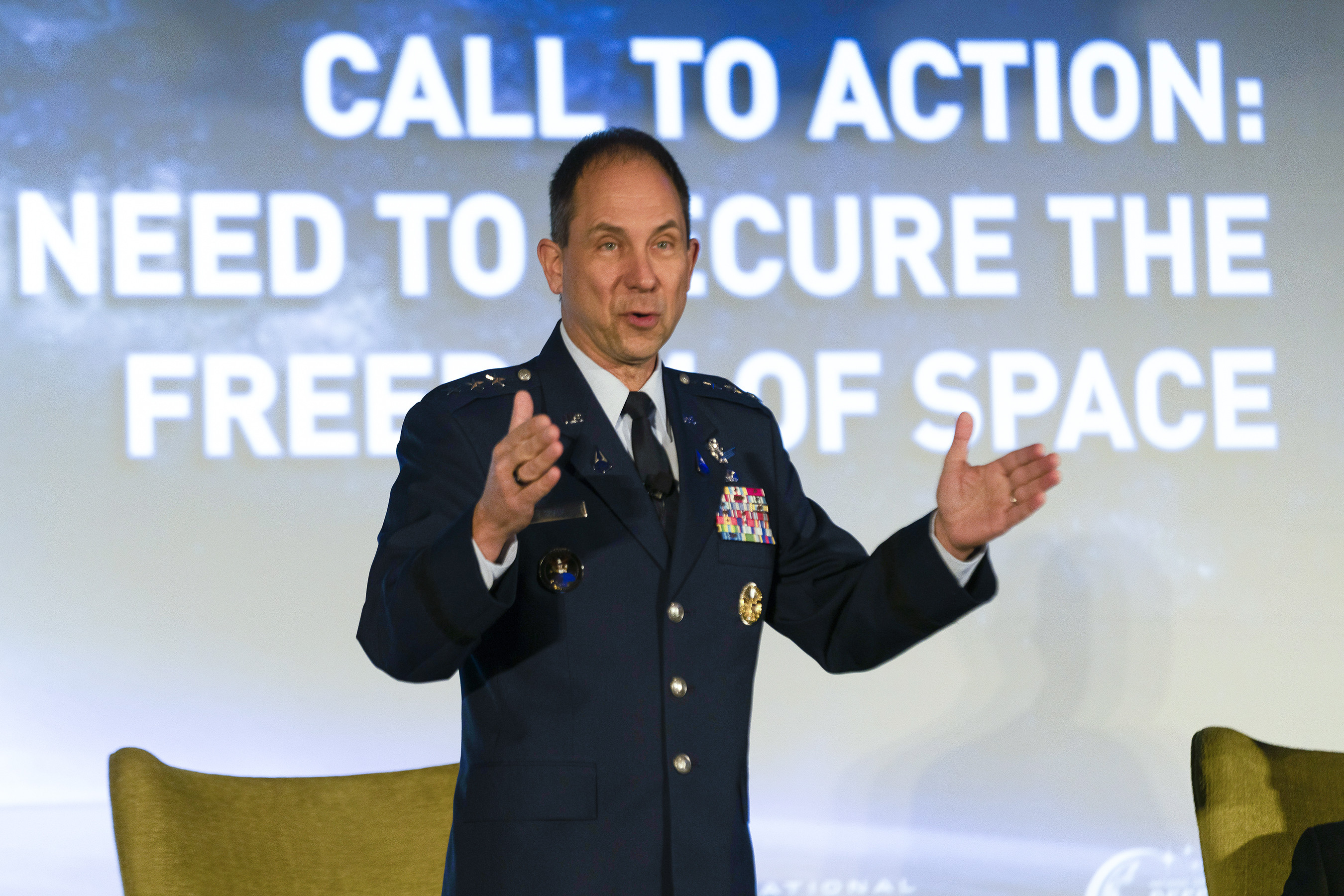
U.S. Space Command deputy commander Lt. Gen. John Shaw recently delivered a keynote address at the National Security Space Association's 2023 Defense and Industry Space Conference on Jan. 24, 2023.

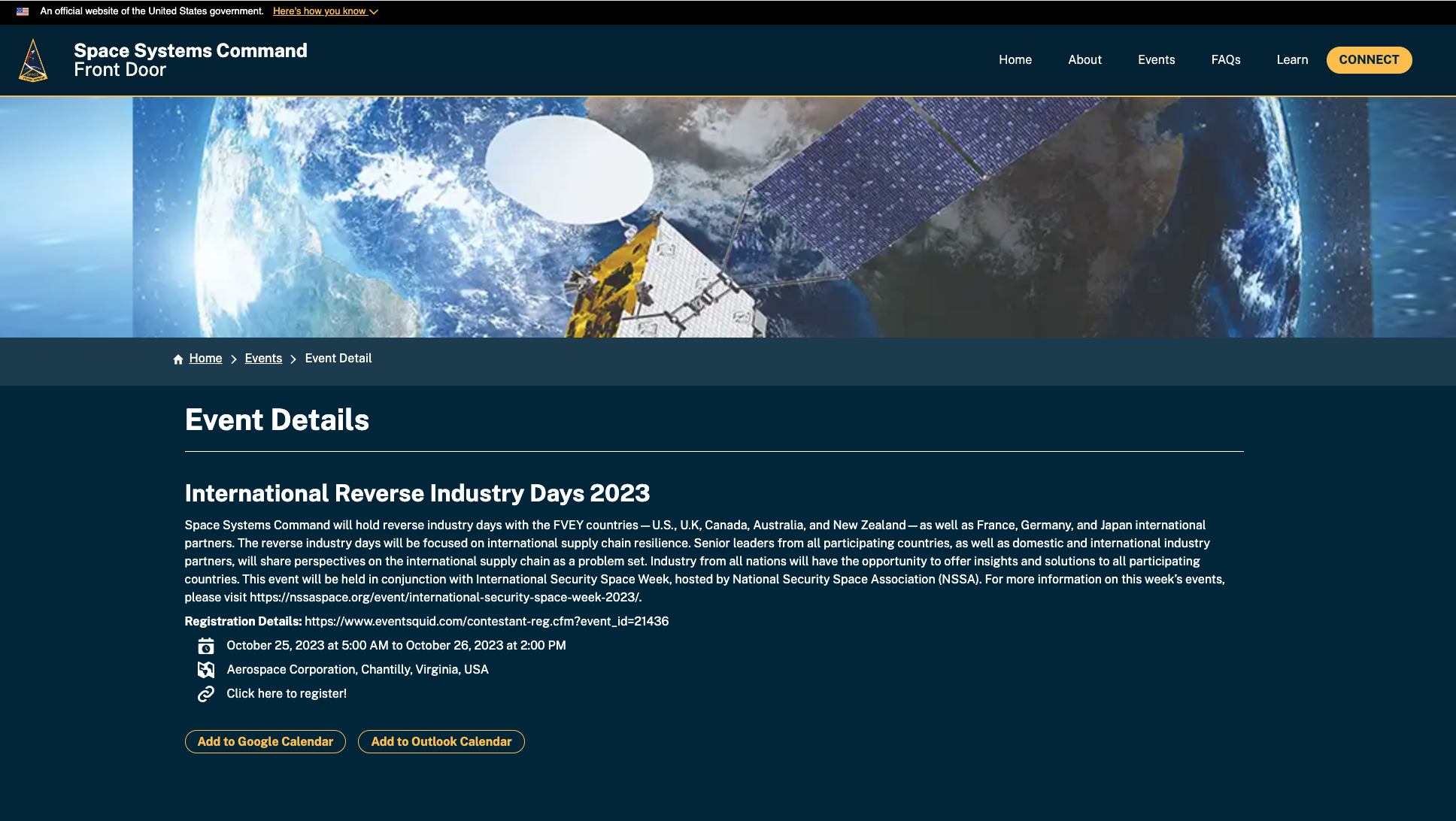
United States Space Force and Space Systems Command details of their joint reverse engineering event with the National Security Space Association in 2023.

The National Security Space Association (NSSA) is a 501(c)(3) organization (EIN 833210801) based in Arlington, Virginia in the United States of America. It describes its mission as guiding communication, strategy, and education of "national security space advancement" and related topics, such as educating and lobbying the United States Congress on matters related to national security and space domain awareness. The NSSA was formed in August 2019. The NSSA specifies on their website that their focus is on military and intelligence support related to Title 10 and Title 50 areas of United States law.

The NSSA works with the defense industrial base and Department of Defense of the United States and its allies. Through 2024, the NSSA has relationships with the United States Space Force and Space Systems Command, the United States Air Force, NASA, and military contractors including Lockheed Martin and the Aerospace Corporation.

== United States government interactions and events ==
The NSSA, though legally a civilian non-profit, hosts and organizes in association with the United States Military events to discuss top secret sensitive compartmented information with groups such as the National Air and Space Intelligence Center (NASIC) based out of Wright-Patterson Air Force Base in Ohio, at locations such as secure Lockheed Martin facilities in Herndon, Virginia.

In 2020, the NSSA called on the United States government to reform "space security policy, practices and governance structures." The NSSA specifically cited that present rules around classification prevented military and intelligence agencies from reliably sharing information about threats to Earth from space or to defend satellites. The NSSA said of current rules, that they "...are creating unnecessary challenges to the efficient and effective conduct of the national security space program." The NSSA added, "As a result, the U.S. government is denying itself access to new ideas, technology, capabilities and applications." In the same year, the United States Geospatial Intelligence Foundation endorsed the NSSAs governmental policy whitepaper, "Establish Governance and Align Security Policies and Programs to Enable U.S. National Security Space Missions."

At the 2021 Government & Defense Conference held annually by investment firm Baird, KBR's Byron Bright, along with Joe Dodd of LinQuest, Kay Sears of Lockheed Martin, HawkEye 360 CEO John Serafini and Loverro Consulting's Douglas Loverro provided updates on the state of the space industry at a panel discussion about the National Security Space Association. Partnered with the United States Space Force and Space Systems Command, the NSSA held its inaugural International Security Space Forum on October 24 with the Aerospace Corporation.

In 2023, the NSSA with the United States Space Force and Space Systems Command organized a conference on reverse engineering for militaries and industries of the Five Eyes (FVEY) nations, consis|ting of Australia, Canada, New Zealand, the United Kingdom, the United States, and also France, Germany, and Japan at the event, which was held at the Aerospace Corporation in Chantilly, Virginia. On November 9, 2023, the NSSA briefed the National Space Council of the Executive Office of the President of the United States on space traffic management, civil space protections, and remote sensing.

On March 12, 2024, the NSSA held a declassified hearing with Sean M. Kirkpatrick, former director of the All-domain Anomaly Resolution Office (AARO) to discuss the 2024 AARO report on unidentified anomalous phenomenon and unidentified flying objects. In May 2024, attention was drawn to an advisory letter from the NSSA citing deficiencies in the US Space Force budget proposed by the administration of United States President Joe Biden, and concerns the USA may cede leadership in space-related affairs to China due to a reduction in Space Forces budget. The Resilient Navigation and Timing Foundation, a public benefit scientific and educational charity focused on Global Positioning System (GPS) related issues, highlighted and called attention to NSSA research in July 2024 about rapidly evolving geopolitical threats from American adversaries targeting critical GPS infrastructure, in the form of "navigation warfare asymmetry." In July 2024, Colonel Robert Davis of the United States Space Systems Command (SSC) and Space Development Agency (SDA), and head of the SSC's Space Sensing Directorate, discussed with the NSSA issues related to radiation hardening of satellite constellations used for missile warning systems. A series of research publications by NSSA in October 2024 were released, detailing perceived budget shortfalls in the United States Space Force. In the releases, NSSA called for an almost doubling of Space Force's budget, based on concerns of the US falling further behind both Russia and China in terms of space-based activities in orbit, cislunar activities, and related support and logistical operations. The United States National Space Intelligence Center held a classified briefing in December 2024 hosted by the NSSA at Lockheed Martin in Virginia, related to orbital counterspace engagements for high-value US government satellite systems.

== NSSA leadership ==
=== Board of Advisors ===
As of March, 2024 the NSSAs Board of Advisors included:

- Charles E. Allen, Under Secretary for Intelligence and Analysis, United States Department of Homeland Security
- Marc J. Berkowitz, Lockheed Martin, former Assistant Deputy Under Secretary of Defense for Space Policy
- Kari Bingen, Center for Strategic and International Studies, former United States Deputy Under Secretary of Defense (I&S)
- Dennis C. Blair, United States Navy (Ret), former Director of National Intelligence
- Jim Bridenstine, former Administrator of NASA, former U.S. Representative (R-OK)
- Robert Cardillo, former director, National Geospatial-Intelligence Agency
- Brigadier General Timothy R. Coffin, USA (Ret), MITRE, former commander, White Sands Missile Range
- Thomas Conroy, former deputy director of national support, National Reconnaissance Office
- Jim Cooper, former U.S. Representative from Tennessee
- General Ronald Fogleman, USAF (Ret), former Chief of Staff of the United States Air Force, member of the Joint Chiefs of Staff
- Susan M. Gordon, former principal deputy director of National Intelligence (PDDNI), Former deputy director of the National Geospatial-Intelligence Agency
- Jeff Gossel, former director National Air and Space Intelligence Center, and former chairman, Defense Intelligence Space Threats and Operations Committee for the Defense Intelligence Agency
- Major General Donald G. Hard, United States Air Force (Ret), former director of Space and Strategic Defense Initiative Programs, Secretary of the Air Force for Acquisition
- Jeffrey K. Harris, former assistant secretary of the Air Force for space and director, National Reconnaissance Office
- Todd Harrison, Metrea Strategic Insights
- Richard Haver, Northrop Grumman, former assistant director of Defense for Intelligence
- Stephen Kitay, Azure Space, former deputy assistant secretary of defense for space policy
- Colonel Douglas L. Loverro, United States Air Force (Ret), former deputy assistant secretary of defense for space policy
- Lieutenant General J. Kevin McLaughlin, United States Air Force (Ret), former deputy commander, United States Cyber Command
- Kevin Meiners, Huddle Up Associates, former deputy director of National Intelligence Enterprise Capacity
- Dawn Meyerriecks, former deputy director for Science and Technology, Central Intelligence Agency
- Major General Richard O'Lear, United States Air Force (Ret), former assistant chief of staff, Intelligence, United States Air Force
- Dr. Scott Pace, Director of the George Washington University Space Policy Institute, and former executive secretary of the National Space Council
- John Paul Parker, Founder, Escape Velocity and Former Intelligence Community Space Executive at the Office of the Director of National Intelligence
- General Ellen M. Pawlikowski, United States Air Force (Ret), former commander, Air Force Materiel Command
- John Serafini, chief executive officer and board member, Hawkeye 360
- Mandy Vaughn, chair, NSSA Education and Workforce Development Center
- Christopher A. Williams, chair, Moorman Center for Space Studies

=== Board of Directors ===
As of March, 2024 the NSSAs board of directors included:

- Joseph K. Dodd, Linquest
- Brandon Anderson, Zoic Labs
- Frank Backes, Capella Space
- Major General Clint Crosier, USAF (Ret.), AWS Global Space Business
- Maria Demaree, Lockheed Martin
- Michael P. Dempsey, Northrop Grumman
- Alex Gross, Parsons Corporation
- Jerry Howe, Leidos
- Steve Jacques, Velos
- Stephen Kitay, Azure Space, Deputy Assistant Secretary of Defense for Space Policy
- David A. Logan, BAE Systems
- Brian Loggins, Reinventing Geospatial, Inc.
- Chris Long, General Dynamics
- General Lester L. Lyles, Air Force Vice Chief of Staff
- Eliahu H. Niewood, Sc.D., MITRE's National Security Sector, United States Air Force Scientific Advisory Board
- Dr. Michelle Parker, Boeing Defense, Space & Security
- Gregory Pejic, Leidos, Former Deputy Assistant Secretary of Defense for Space Policy
- Dan Piemont, ABL Space Systems
- Lee Rizzo, SAIC
- Kent Wilcher, KBR
