= Letitia Long =

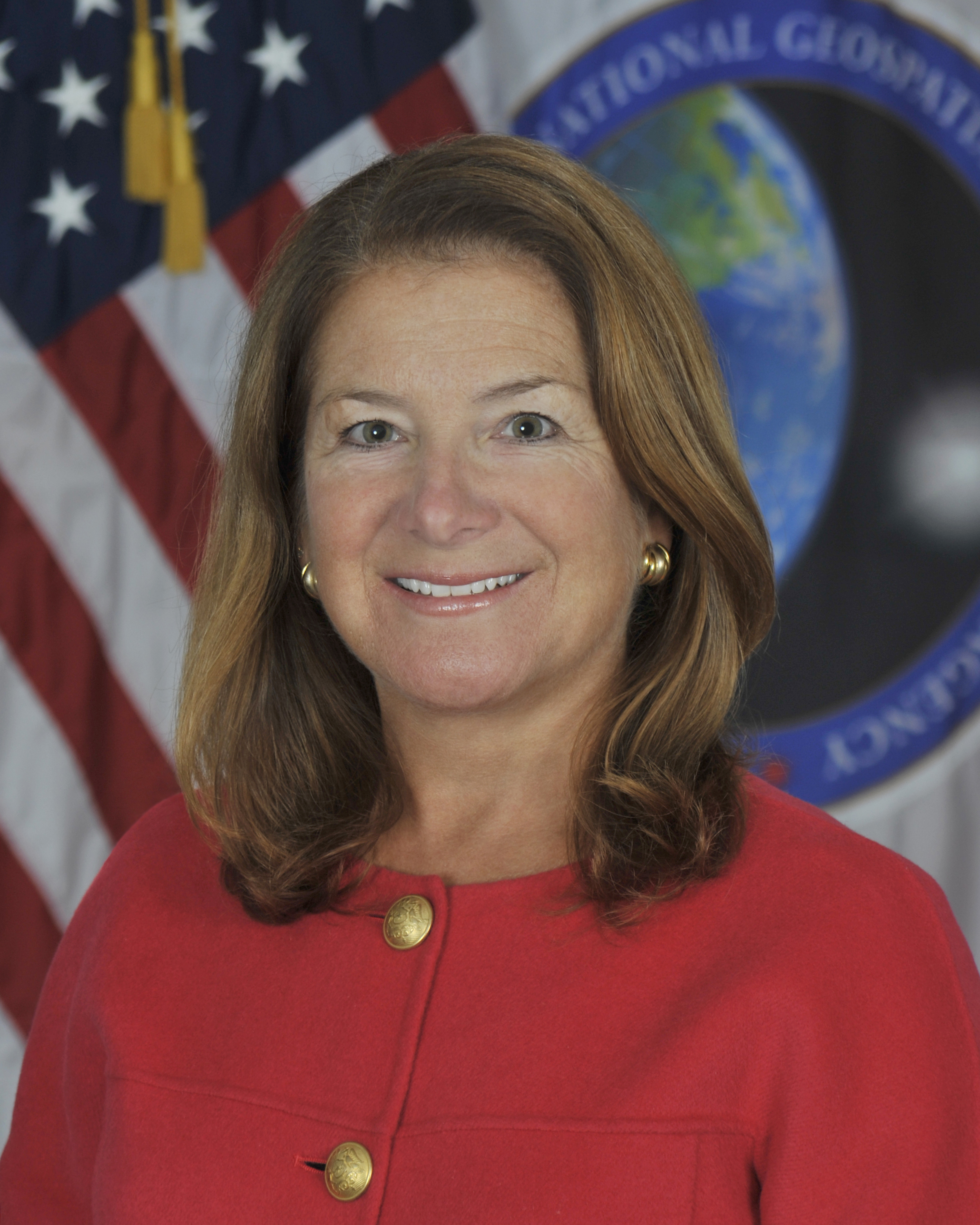

5th Director of the National Geospatial-Intelligence Agency
- In office August 2010 – October 2014
- Preceded by: Robert B. Murrett
- Succeeded by: Robert Cardillo

Deputy Director of the Defense Intelligence Agency
- In office May 2006 – July 2010

Personal details
- Born: 1958 or 1959 (age 67–68)
- Education: Virginia Tech (BS) Catholic University of America (MS)
- Nickname: Tish

Letitia A. Long served as a civilian in the U.S. Navy and the Intelligence Community between 1978 and 2014, retiring as the fifth Director the National Geospatial-Intelligence Agency, and the first woman to lead a major U.S. intelligence agency, in October 2014. She currently is the chairman of the board for the Intelligence and National Security Alliance (INSA).

== Career ==
She began her career in the U.S. Navy in 1978 as a civilian intern developing capabilities for the submarine force. She transitioned to Naval Intelligence program management in the mid-1990s. Detailed to the Defense Intelligence Agency (DIA)] in 1995, she managed defense-wide intelligence funding programs and was named the first Chief Information Officer for the agency. Joining the Director of Central Intelligence's Community Management Staff in January 1998 as the executive director for Intelligence Community Affairs, she was responsible for community-wide policy formulation, resource planning and program assessment and evaluation. The Community Management Staff was part of the initial effort to more effectively manage the Intelligence Community in the pre-9/11 period.

Returning to the Navy in July 2000, she became the first female deputy director of Naval Intelligence working for RADM Richard B. Porterfield, then Director of Naval Intelligence. Naval Intelligence lost eight members in the September 11, 2001 attack on the Pentagon.

She joined the newly established office of the Undersecretary of Defense for Intelligence in June 2003 as the Deputy Undersecretary of Defense for Intelligence (Policy, Requirements, and Resources) until May 2006. Prior to taking over as the NGA director on August 9, 2010, Long served as the deputy director of the Defense Intelligence Agency from May 2006 until July 2010.

During her tenure at NGA, she led efforts to establish the agency's first ‘Map of the World’, for intelligence users. NGA became the first U.S. agency to adopt open-source software development to deliver its software to first responders for collaboration, during and after natural disasters. She also led the agency as it provided critical support to the SEAL Team Six operation that led to the death of Osama bin Laden in May 2011.

Long currently sits on the boards of Raytheon Company, Urthecast Corporation and Noblis, Inc. She is also on the board of the Virginia Tech School of Public and International Affairs and previously served on the board of the United States Geospatial Intelligence Foundation (USGIF). In 2021, Long was elected onto T-Mobile's board of directors as a director focusing on national security and the company's post-merger commitments to Sprint. In 2021, Long joined the National Security Advisory Board of venture capital firm, Shield Capital, as Senior Advisor.

== Education ==
Long earned a Bachelor of Science in Electrical Engineering from Virginia Tech in 1982 and a Master of Science in Mechanical Engineering from the Catholic University of America in 1988.

== Awards ==
Among other professional achievements, Long has been the recipient of the Department of Defense Medal for Distinguished Civilian Service, the Presidential Rank Award of Distinguished Executive, the Navy Distinguished Civilian Service Award, the Presidential Rank Award of Meritorious Executive (two awards) and the National Intelligence Distinguished Service Medal (three awards). In 2011, she received the Charlie Allen Award for Distinguished Intelligence Service from the Armed Forces Communications and Electronics Association, was decorated with the Medal of Merit by the King of Norway, was appointed to the rank of Chevalier in the National Order of the Legion of Honor of France and awarded the Commander's Cross of the Order of Merit of the Republic of Poland. In 2015, she received the Engineering Distinguished Alumni Award from the Catholic University School of Engineering.

Government offices
Preceded by Robert B. Murrett	Director of the National Geospatial-Intelligence Agency; 2010–2014	Succeeded by Robert Cardillo
