= Russia and anti-satellite weapons allegations =

The United States has alleged that Russia is developing nuclear anti-satellite weapons.

== History ==
=== Anti-satellite missile tests (2020–2022) ===
On 15 November 2021, the Ministry of Defence conducted an anti-satellite missile test with the PL-19 Nudol, destroying Kosmos 1408, an inactive Russian apparatus. According to NASA administrator Bill Nelson, Roscosmos was unaware of the test. Five astronauts aboard the International Space Station were forced to take shelter and three astronauts aboard the Tiangong space station were endangered by the resulting debris cloud. The Federal Air Transport Agency filed an airspace notice over Plesetsk Cosmodrome that morning; Federal Assembly committee on defense chair Yury Shvytkin denied a test taking place. The test was criticized by United States secretary of state Antony Blinken as "recklessly conducted". The United States Space Command stated that debris would remain in space for years.

=== United States allegations (2024–present) ===
On 14 February 2024, United States House Permanent Select Committee on Intelligence chairman Mike Turner issued concerns over a "national security threat", requesting president Joe Biden declassify information relating to the threat; a bipartisan statement by the Senate Select Committee on Intelligence stated that the declassification process would be tedious. ABC News later reported that the threat concerned attempts by Russia to launch a nuclear anti-satellite weapon. The deployment of an orbital nuclear weapon would violate the Outer Space Treaty. According to officials, the United States does not have countermeasures against anti-satellite weapons.

On 20 February, Bloomberg News reported that the United States had informed its allies that Russia may attempt to launch a nuclear anti-satellite weapon by the end of the year. Russian president Vladimir Putin denied the claims.

== Response ==
=== International response ===
In The New York Times, Aerospace Security Project director Kari Bingen and Project on Nuclear Issues director Heather Williams compared Russian anti-satellite capabilities to Sputnik 1 and the Sputnik crisis, a claim made by Bloomberg News's Katrina Manson.
