= James Clapper =

American government official (born 1941)

Jim Clapper
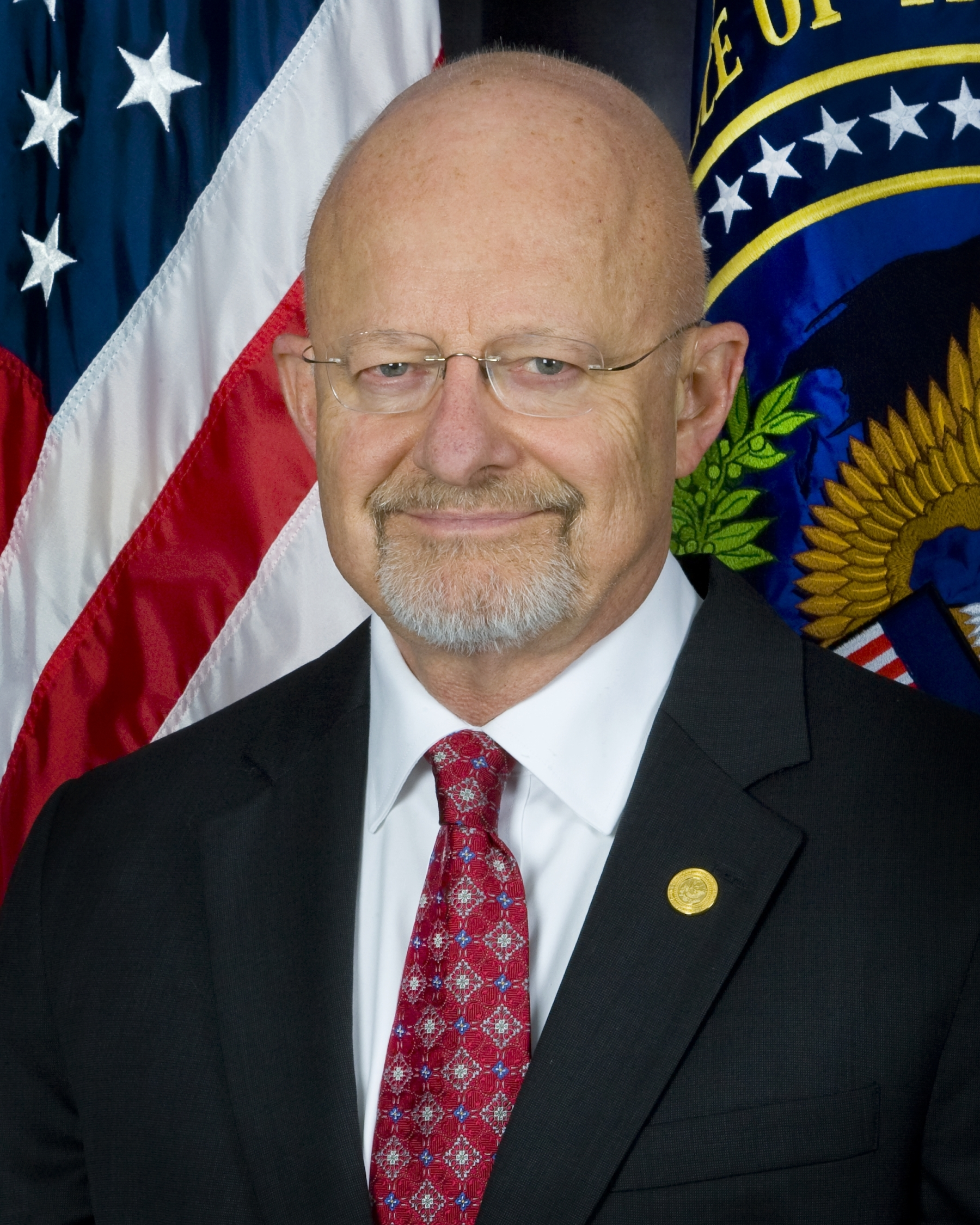

4th Director of National Intelligence
- In office August 9, 2010 – January 20, 2017
- President: Barack Obama
- Deputy: Stephanie O'Sullivan
- Preceded by: David Gompert (acting)
- Succeeded by: Stephanie O'Sullivan (acting)

Under Secretary of Defense for Intelligence
- In office April 15, 2007 – June 5, 2010
- President: George W. Bush; Barack Obama
- Preceded by: Stephen Cambone
- Succeeded by: Michael Vickers

Director of the National Geospatial-Intelligence Agency
- In office September 2001 – June 2006
- President: George W. Bush
- Preceded by: James C. King
- Succeeded by: Robert B. Murrett

Director of the Defense Intelligence Agency
- In office November 1991 – August 1995
- President: George H. W. Bush; Bill Clinton
- Preceded by: Dennis M. Nagy (acting)
- Succeeded by: Kenneth Minihan

Personal details
- Born: James Robert Clapper Jr. March 14, 1941 (age 85) Fort Wayne, Indiana, U.S.
- Spouse: Susan Terry
- Children: 2
- Education: University of Maryland, College Park (BS); St. Mary's University, Texas (MA)

Military service
- Allegiance: United States
- Branch/service: United States Air Force
- Years of service: 1963–1995
- Rank: Lieutenant General
- Battles/wars: Vietnam War
- Awards: Legion of Merit (3); Bronze Star (2); Air Medal (2)
- Clapper's voice Clapper testifying on the structural evolution of al-Qaeda and changes to Section 702 of FISA and Section 215 of the Patriot Act. Recorded January 29, 2014

James Robert Clapper Jr. (born March 14, 1941) is a retired lieutenant general in the United States Air Force and former Director of National Intelligence. Clapper has held several key positions within the United States Intelligence Community. He served as director of the Defense Intelligence Agency (DIA) from 1992 until 1995. He was the first director of defense intelligence within the Office of the Director of National Intelligence and simultaneously the Under Secretary of Defense for Intelligence. He served as the director of the National Geospatial-Intelligence Agency (NGA) from September 2001 until June 2006.

On June 5, 2010, President Barack Obama nominated Clapper to replace Dennis C. Blair as United States Director of National Intelligence. Clapper was unanimously confirmed by the Senate for the position on August 5, 2010.

Following the June 2013 leak of documents detailing the NSA practice of collecting telephone metadata on millions of Americans' telephone calls, Clapper was accused of perjury for telling a congressional committee hearing that the NSA does not collect any type of data on millions of Americans earlier that year. One senator asked for his resignation, and a group of 26 senators complained about Clapper's responses under questioning. In November 2016, Clapper resigned as director of national intelligence, effective at the end of President Obama's term. In May 2017, he joined the Washington, D.C.-based think tank the Center for a New American Security (CNAS) as a Distinguished Senior Fellow for Intelligence and National Security. In August 2017, CNN hired Clapper as a national security analyst.

== Early life and education ==
James Robert Clapper Jr. was born on March 14, 1941, in Fort Wayne, Indiana, the son of Anne Elizabeth (née Wheatley) and First Lieutenant James Robert Clapper. His father worked in US Army signals intelligence during World War II, retiring as a colonel in 1972 then worked in security at George Mason University in the late 1970s and early 1980s. His maternal grandfather, James McNeal Wheatley, was an Episcopal minister.

Clapper graduated from Nurnberg American High School in West Germany in 1959 where his father was stationed at the time.

Clapper earned a Bachelor of Science degree in political science from the University of Maryland in 1963 and a Master of Science degree in political science from St. Mary's University, Texas, in 1970.

== Military career ==
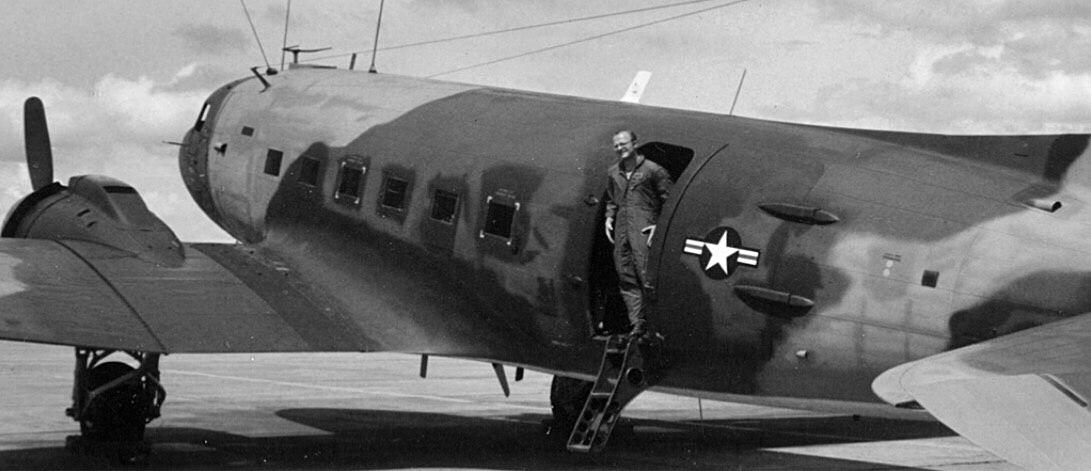
Captain James Clapper during his flying mission on a Douglas EC-47 Skytrain during the Vietnam War, June 1971

After a brief enlistment in the United States Marine Corps Reserve, where Clapper served as a rifleman and attended the junior course of Platoon Leader Course he transferred to the U.S. Air Force Reserve Officer Training Corps program. In 1963, he graduated as a distinguished military graduate from the University of Maryland and was commissioned as an Air Force second lieutenant. He served two tours of duty in Southeast Asia where he commanded a signals intelligence detachment based at a listening post in Thailand's Udon Thani Province, and flew 73 combat support missions in EC-47s, including some over Laos and Cambodia. Later, he commanded a signals intelligence (SIGINT) wing at Fort George G. Meade, Maryland, and the Air Force Technical Applications Center, Patrick Air Force Base, Florida. During the Persian Gulf War, Clapper served as Chief of Air Force Intelligence.

Clapper became Director of the Defense Intelligence Agency in November 1991 under George H. W. Bush. While serving as DIA director, he oversaw the transformation of the National Military Intelligence Center into the National Military Joint Intelligence Center. He also launched an initiative to reorganize intelligence analysis by specialists in enemy weapons rather than specialists in countries and regions. The initiative failed because it created functional stovepipes which "reduced the coherence of the analytic effort", whereupon Clapper decided to restore the original organizational structure using strong regional elements. Clapper retired from active duty as a lieutenant general after thirty-two years of service in September 1995. In 1996, alongside General Wayne Downing, he was a member of the investigatory inquiry into the Khobar Towers bombing, which killed 20 people, including 19 American servicemen.

He then spent six years in private industry, including two years as president of the Security Affairs Support Association, an organization of intelligence contractors. In August 2001, he was named as the director of the National Imagery and Mapping Agency (later renamed National Geospatial-Intelligence Agency) where he served until June 2006.

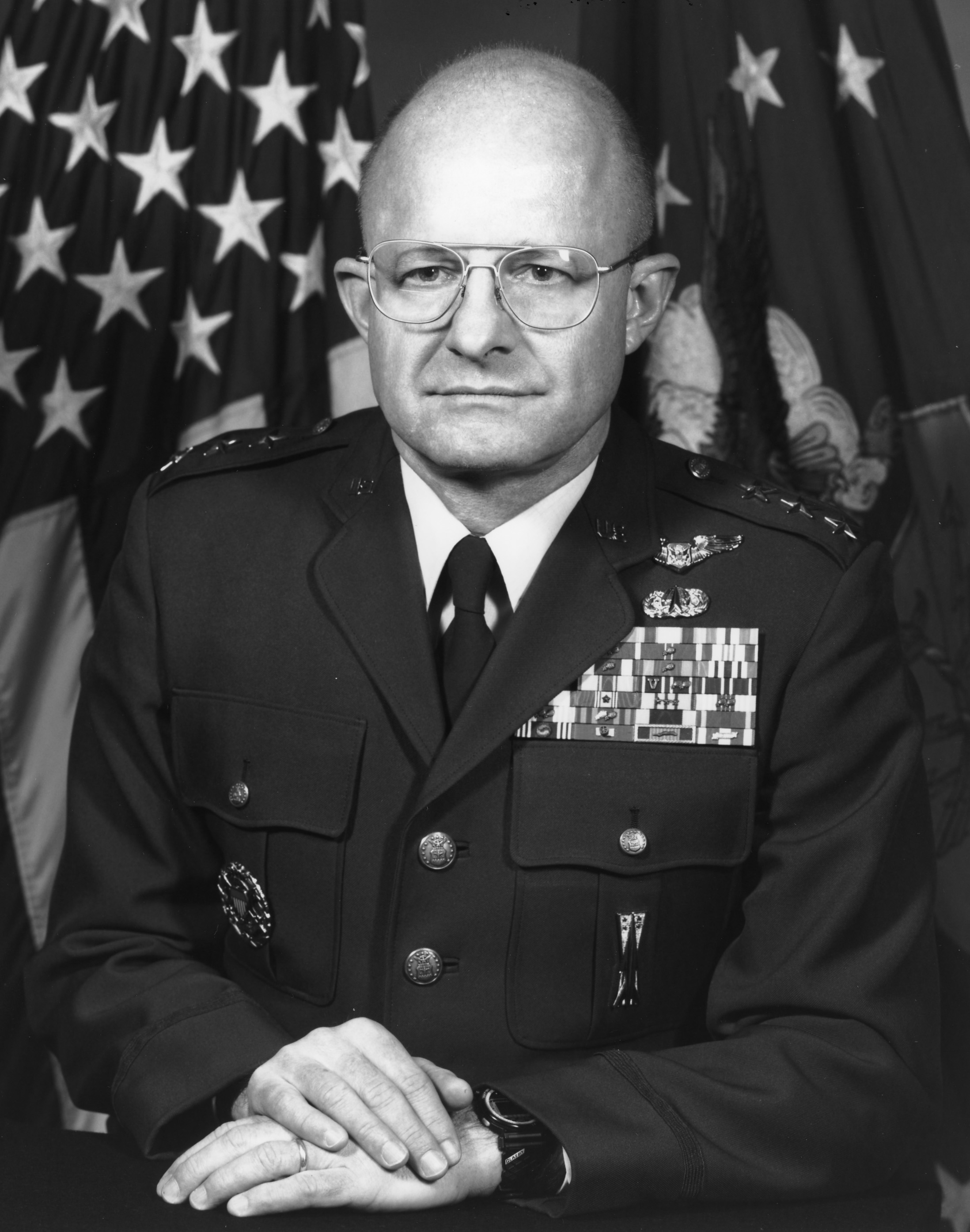
Clapper as a USAF lieutenant general in the mid-1990s

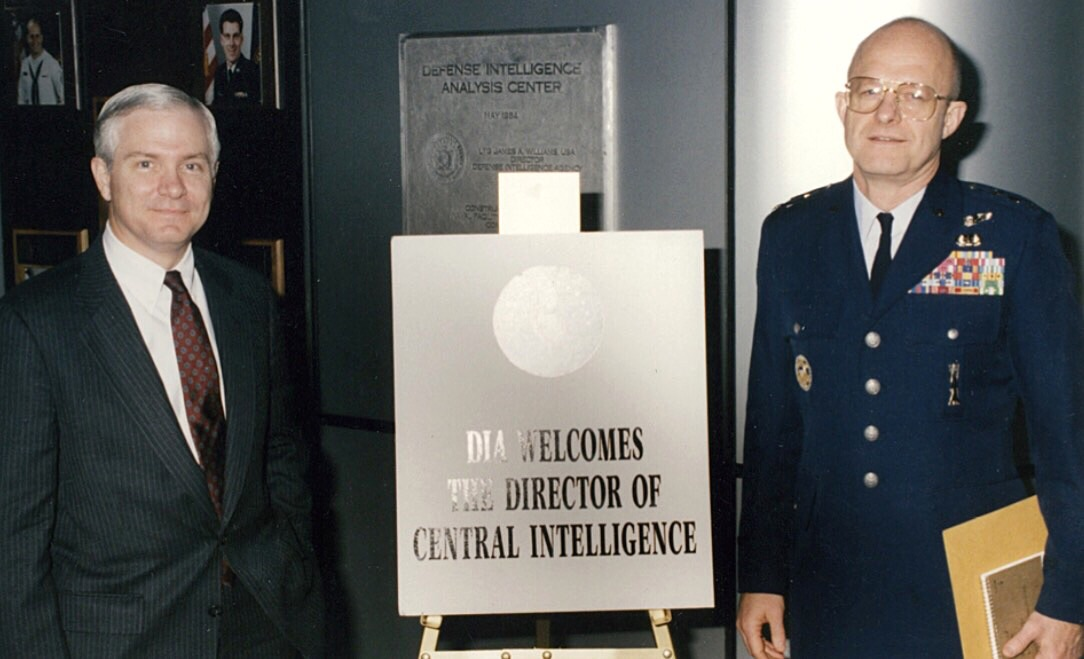
Lieutenant General James Clapper during his tenure as Director of Defense Intelligence Agency with Director of Central Intelligence Agency Robert Gates at Defense Intelligence Agency Headquarters in Bolling Air Force Base, Washington, DC, January 17, 1992

== Private sector career ==
From 2006 to 2007, Clapper worked for GeoEye (satellite company) and was an executive on the boards of three government contractors, two of which were doing business with the NGA while he served as director. In October 2006, he began working as a chief operating officer for the British military intelligence company Detica, now DFI and U.S.–based subsidiary of BAE Systems. He also worked for SRA International and Booz Allen Hamilton.

Clapper defended the private sector's role in intelligence-gathering in his 2010 confirmation hearings telling the committee, "I worked as a contractor for six years myself, so I think I have a good understanding of the contribution that they have made and will continue to make."

== Under Secretary of Defense for Intelligence, 2007–2010 ==
For the 2006–2007 academic year, Clapper held the position of Georgetown University's Intelligence and National Security Alliance Distinguished Professor in the Practice of Intelligence.

While teaching at Georgetown, he was officially nominated by President George W. Bush to be Under Secretary of Defense for Intelligence (USD(I)) on January 29, 2007, and confirmed by the United States Senate on April 11, 2007. He was the second person ever to hold this position, which oversees the Defense Intelligence Agency, the National Geospatial-Intelligence Agency, the National Security Agency (NSA), and the National Reconnaissance Office. He also worked closely with DNI John Michael McConnell.

== Director of National Intelligence, 2010–2017 ==
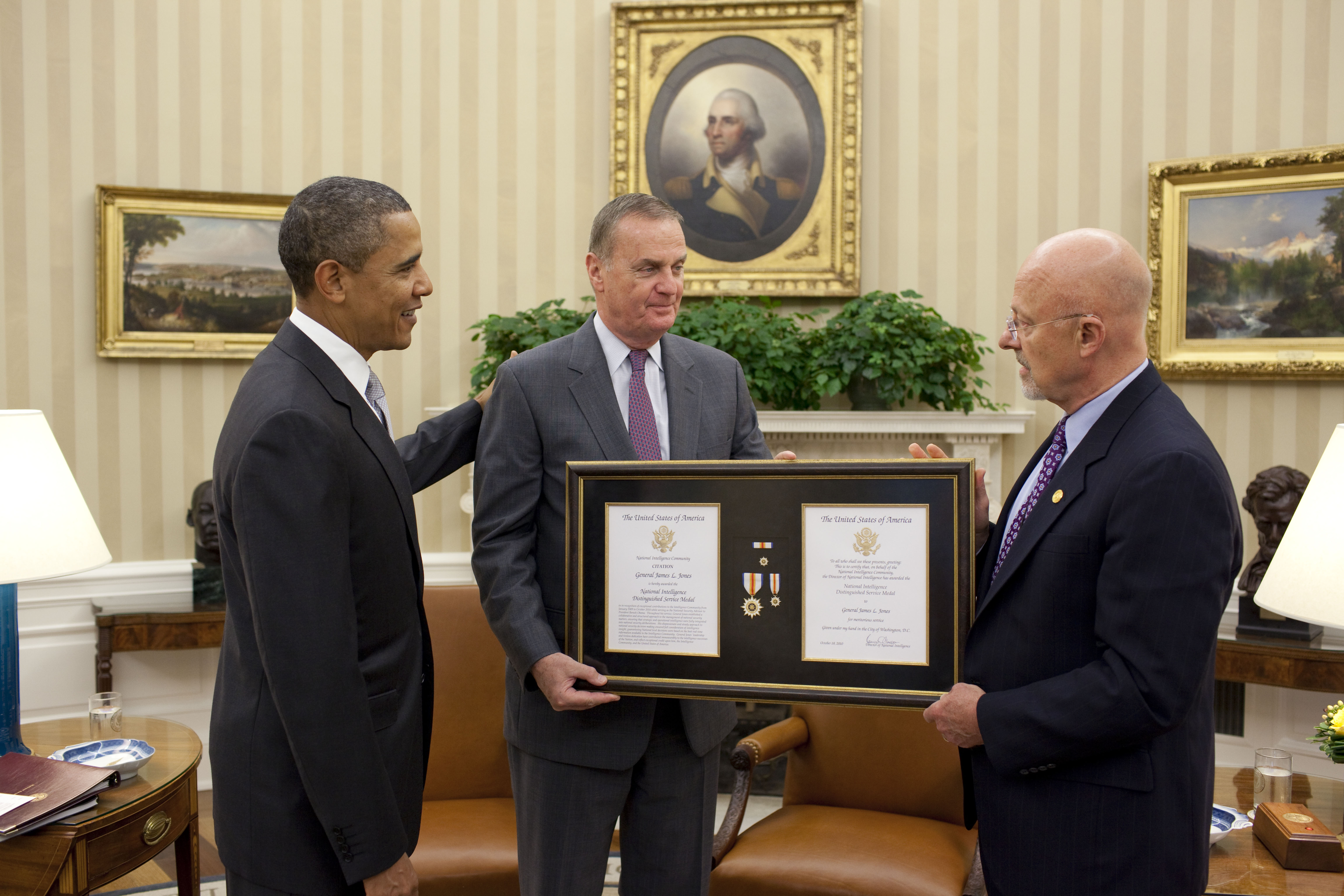
Clapper and Barack Obama presented the NIDSM to James L. Jones, October 20, 2010.

=== Nomination, 2010 ===
Defense Secretary Robert Gates suggested to President Obama that he nominate Clapper to replace Dennis C. Blair as Director of National Intelligence, but both Chairman Dianne Feinstein and Vice-chairman Kit Bond of the U.S. Senate Intelligence Committee offered reservations regarding his appointment due to his military background and emphasis on defense-related issues. In an official statement in the White House Rose Garden on June 5, 2010, Obama announced his nomination of Clapper, saying he "possesses a quality that I value in all my advisers: a willingness to tell leaders what we need to know even if it's not what we want to hear."

Lawmakers approved his nomination on August 5, 2010, in a unanimous vote after the Senate Intelligence Committee backed him with a 15–0 vote. During his testimony for the position, Clapper pledged to advance the DNI's authorities, exert tighter control over programming and budgeting, and provide oversight over the CIA's use of drones in Pakistan.

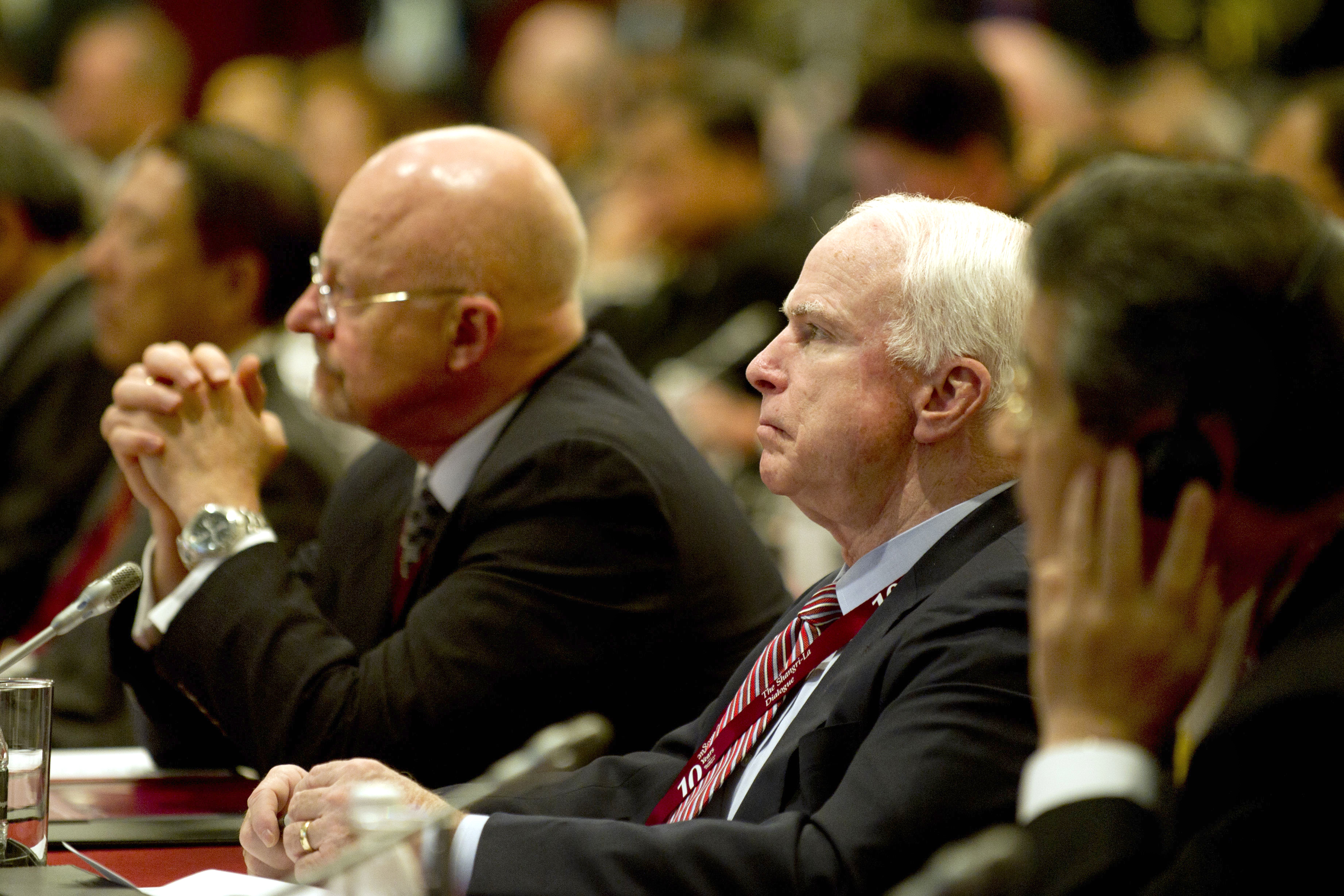
Clapper and Senator John McCain listen as Defense Secretary Gates addresses the audience, June 4, 2011.

==== Creating deputy director for intelligence integration position ====
In August 2010, Clapper announced a new position at the DNI called the deputy director of national intelligence for intelligence integration, to integrate the former posts of deputy director for analysis and deputy director for collections into one position. Robert Cardillo, the deputy director of the Defense Intelligence Agency, was tapped to fill the new post.

==== Budget authority over U.S. Intelligence Community ====
After an agreement between Clapper and Defense Secretary Robert Gates, his office assumed administrative control over the National Intelligence Program. Previously the NIP was itemized within the Defense Department budget to keep the line item and dollar amount from public view. In late October 2011, Clapper's office disclosed the top line budget as $53.1 billion, which was below the $75 billion figure circulated in 2010, in the belief the budget change would strengthen the DNI's authority.

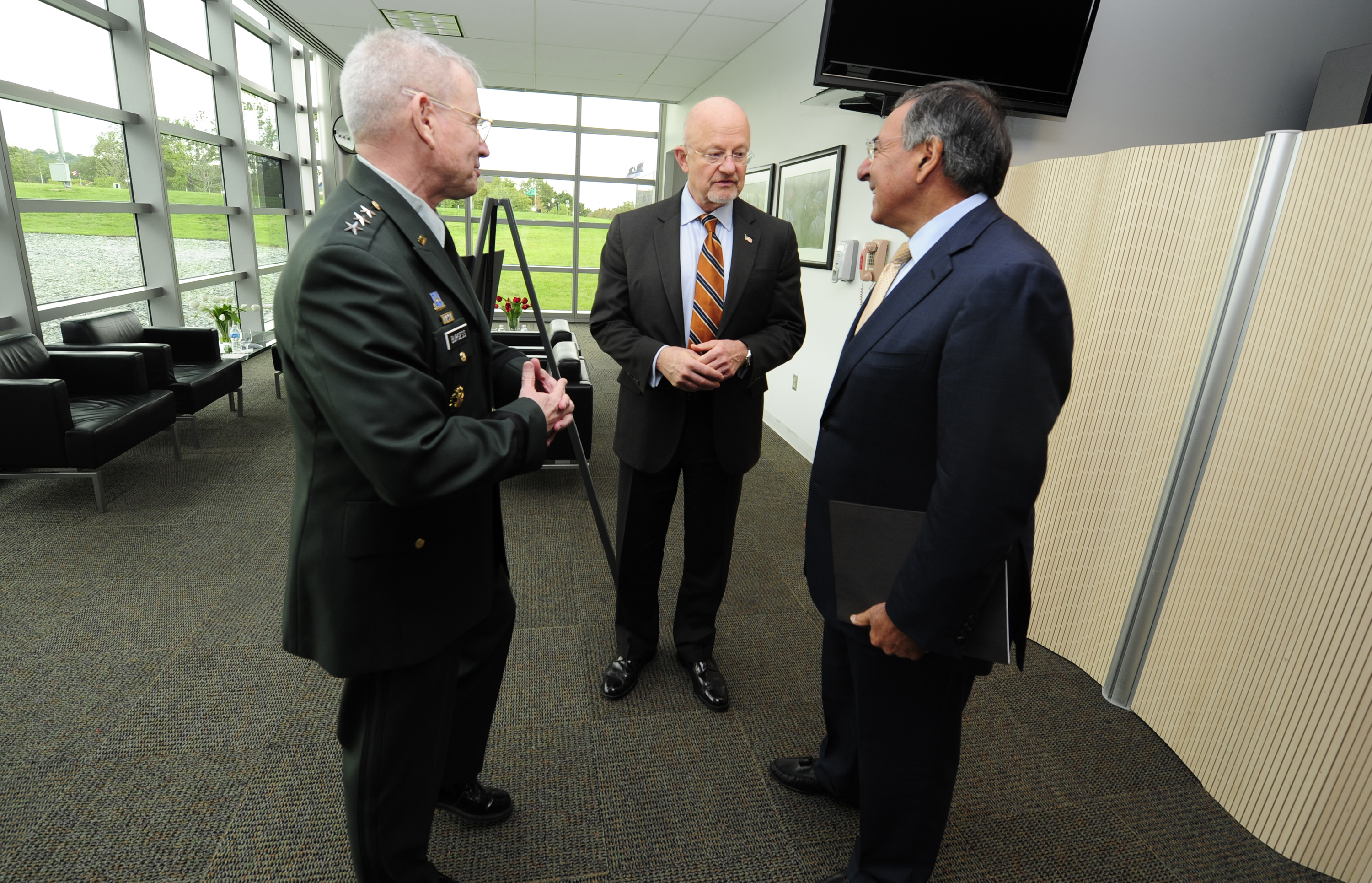
Clapper meets with Defense Secretary Leon Panetta and DIA chief Ronald Burgess, September 29, 2011.

=== Iran and Saudi Arabia, 2012 ===
In January 2012, Clapper said that "some Iranian officials, probably including supreme leader Ali Khamenei, have changed their calculus and are now more willing to conduct an attack in the United States in response to real or perceived US actions that threaten the regime." Clapper added that Iran was "keeping open the option to develop nuclear weapons." In February 2012, Clapper told the Senate that if Iran is attacked over its alleged nuclear weapons program, it could respond by closing the Strait of Hormuz to ships and launch missiles at regional U.S. forces and allies.

Former Defense Intelligence Agency chief Lt. Gen. Ronald Burgess told senators that Iran is unlikely to initiate or intentionally provoke a conflict. Clapper said it's "technically feasible" that Tehran could produce a nuclear weapon in one or two years if its leaders decide to build one, "but practically not likely." Both men said they did not believe Israel had decided to strike Iran back then.

In December 2012, Clapper authorized the NSA to expand its "third party" relationship with Saudi Arabia. The goal was "to facilitate the Saudi government's ability to utilize SIGINT to locate and track individuals of mutual interest within Saudi Arabia."

=== Common information technology enterprise and desktop, 2012 ===
Clapper made "intelligence integration" across the Intelligence Community the primary mission of the ODNI. In 2012 the office announced an initiative to create a common information technology desktop for the entire Intelligence Community, moving away from unconnected agency networks to a common enterprise model. In late fiscal 2013, the shared IT infrastructure reached operating capability with plans to bring on all intelligence agencies over the next few years.

=== Testimony to Congress on NSA surveillance, 2013 ===
Excerpt of James Clapper's testimony before the Senate Select Committee on Intelligence

On March 12, 2013, during a United States Senate Select Committee on Intelligence hearing, Senator Ron Wyden quoted NSA director Keith B. Alexander's keynote speech at the 2012 DEF CON. Alexander had stated that "Our job is foreign intelligence" and that "those who would want to weave the story that we have millions or hundreds of millions of dossiers on people, is absolutely false.... From my perspective, this is absolute nonsense." Wyden then asked Clapper, "Does the NSA collect any type of data at all on millions or hundreds of millions of Americans?" He responded, "No, sir." Wyden asked, "It does not?" and Clapper said, "Not wittingly. There are cases where they could inadvertently, perhaps, collect, but not wittingly."

When Edward Snowden was asked during a January 26, 2014, television interview in Moscow on what the decisive moment was or what caused him to whistle-blow, he replied: "Sort of the breaking point was seeing the director of national intelligence, James Clapper, directly lie under oath to Congress. ... Seeing that really meant for me there was no going back."

==== Responses ====
On June 5, 2013, The Guardian published the first of the global surveillance documents leaked by Edward Snowden, including a top secret court order showing that the NSA had collected phone records from over 120 million Verizon subscribers.

The following day, Clapper acknowledged that the NSA collects telephony metadata on millions of Americans' telephone calls. This metadata information included originating and terminating telephone number, telephone calling card number, International Mobile Station Equipment Identity (IMEI) number, time, and duration of phone calls, but did not include the name, address, or financial information of any subscriber. The rationale for this data collection, which was said to be permitted under Section 216 of the Patriot Act, was that if the NSA discovered a terrorist was called into the U.S. and knew the number the terrorist was calling from, the NSA could look at the phone records to see what U.S. number he was calling to. If that indicated something worth investigating, obtaining caller identities and actually listening to the content of the calls would require a warrant from a U.S. court.

On June 7, Clapper was interviewed by Andrea Mitchell on NBC. Clapper said that "I responded in what I thought was the most truthful, or least untruthful manner by saying no" when he testified.

In Clapper's 2018 memoir, he provides a fuller explanation of the incident:

... because the NSA program under Section 215 was highly classified, Senator Wyden wouldn't or shouldn't have been asking questions that required classified answers on camera. ... my error had been forgetting about Section 215, but even if I had remembered it, there still would have been no acceptable, unclassified way for me to answer the question in an open hearing. Even my saying, "We'll have to wait for the closed, classified session to discuss this", would have given something away. ... I ought to have sent a classified letter to Senator Wyden explaining my thoughts when I'd answered and that I misunderstood what he was actually asking me about. Yes, I made a mistake – a big one – when I responded, but I did not lie. I answered with truth in what I understood the context of the question to be.

On June 11, U.S. Senator Ron Wyden (D-OR) accused Clapper of not giving a "straight answer", noting that Clapper's office had been provided with the question a day in advance of the hearing and was given the opportunity following Clapper's testimony to amend his response.

On June 12, 2013, Representative Justin Amash became the first congressman to openly accuse Director Clapper of criminal perjury, calling for his resignation. In a series of tweets he stated: "It now appears clear that the director of national intelligence, James Clapper, lied under oath to Congress and the American people", and "Perjury is a serious crime ... [and] Clapper should resign immediately". U.S. Senator Rand Paul (R-KY) said "The director of national intelligence, in March, did directly lie to Congress, which is against the law." Paul later suggested that Clapper might deserve prison time for his testimony.

On June 27, 2013, a group of 26 senators sent him a complaint letter opposing the use of a "body of secret law".

==== Admission of forgetfulness ====
On July 1, 2013, Clapper apologized, telling Senate Intelligence Committee that "my response was clearly erroneous—for which I apologize." On July 2, Clapper said that he had forgotten about the Patriot Act, which was later clarified that he forgot Section 215 of the act specifically, and therefore had given an "erroneous" answer.

On July 2, 2013, journalist Glenn Greenwald accused the U.S. media of focusing on Edward Snowden instead of focusing on wrongdoing by Clapper and other U.S. officials. Jody Westby of Forbes argued that due to the revelations, the American public should ask Clapper to resign from office, arguing that "not only did Mr. Clapper give false testimony to Congress, even his June 6 statement was false. We now know—since the companies identified by the Washington Post have started fessing up—that lots more than telephony metadata has been collected and searched." Fred Kaplan of Slate also advocated having Clapper fired, arguing "if President Obama really welcomes an open debate on this subject, James Clapper has disqualified himself from participation in it. He has to go." Andy Greenberg of Forbes said that NSA officials, along with Clapper, in the years 2012 and 2013 "publicly denied—often with carefully hedged words—participating in the kind of snooping on Americans that has since become nearly undeniable." John Dean, former White House Counsel for President Nixon, has claimed that it is unlikely Clapper would be charged with the three principal criminal statutes that address false statements to Congress: perjury, obstruction of Congress, and making false statements. David Sirota of Salon said that if the U.S. government fails to treat Clapper and Alexander in the same way as it did Roger Clemens, "the message from the government would be that lying to Congress about baseball is more of a felony than lying to Congress about Americans' Fourth Amendment rights" and that the "message would declare that when it comes to brazen law-breaking, as long as you are personally connected to the president, you get protection rather than the prosecution you deserve."

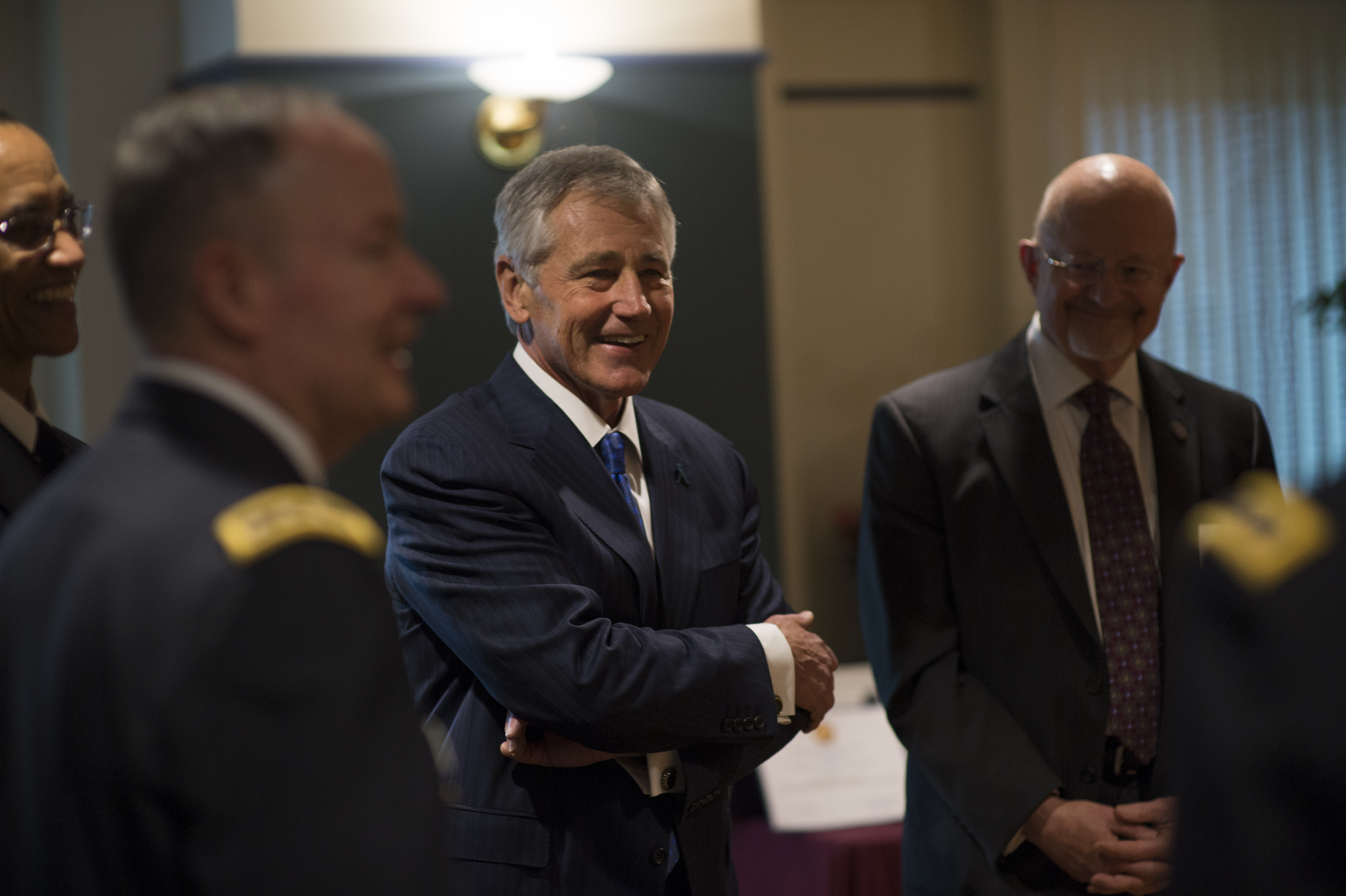
Clapper and NSA director Keith B. Alexander (left) were both accused of lying under oath to Congress.

On December 19, 2013, seven Republican members of the House Judiciary Committee called on Attorney General Eric Holder to investigate Clapper, stating "witnesses cannot be allowed to lie to Congress".

In January 2014, Robert S. Litt, general counsel to the Office of the DNI, stated that Clapper did not lie to Congress, citing the context of the question and the fact that Clapper's staff had answered the question in writing the day before. In May 2015, Litt clarified that Clapper "had absolutely forgotten the existence of" Section 215 of the Patriot Act, and claimed he had been thinking of Section 702 of the Foreign Intelligence Surveillance Act when he gave the answer.

In January 2014, six members of the House of Representatives wrote to President Obama urging him to dismiss Clapper for lying to Congress, stating his statement was "incompatible with the goal of restoring trust" in the intelligence community, but were rebuffed by the White House.

Caitlin Hayden, the White House National Security Council spokesperson, said in an e-mailed statement that Obama has "full faith in Director Clapper's leadership of the intelligence community. The Director has provided an explanation for his answers to Senator Wyden and made clear that he did not intend to mislead the Congress."

=== Ban on employee contacts with the media, 2014 ===
In March 2014, Clapper signed a directive that barred employees of the intelligence community from providing "intelligence-related information" to reporters without prior authorization, even to provide unclassified information, making a violation of the directive a "security violation". The order, which purportedly came as a result of congressional urging to crack down on leaks, drew criticism from public watchdogs who claimed that the move would stifle inter-agency criticism and threaten whistleblowers. The following month he implemented a new pre-publication review policy for the ODNI's current and former employees that prohibits them from citing news reports based on leaks in their unofficial writings.

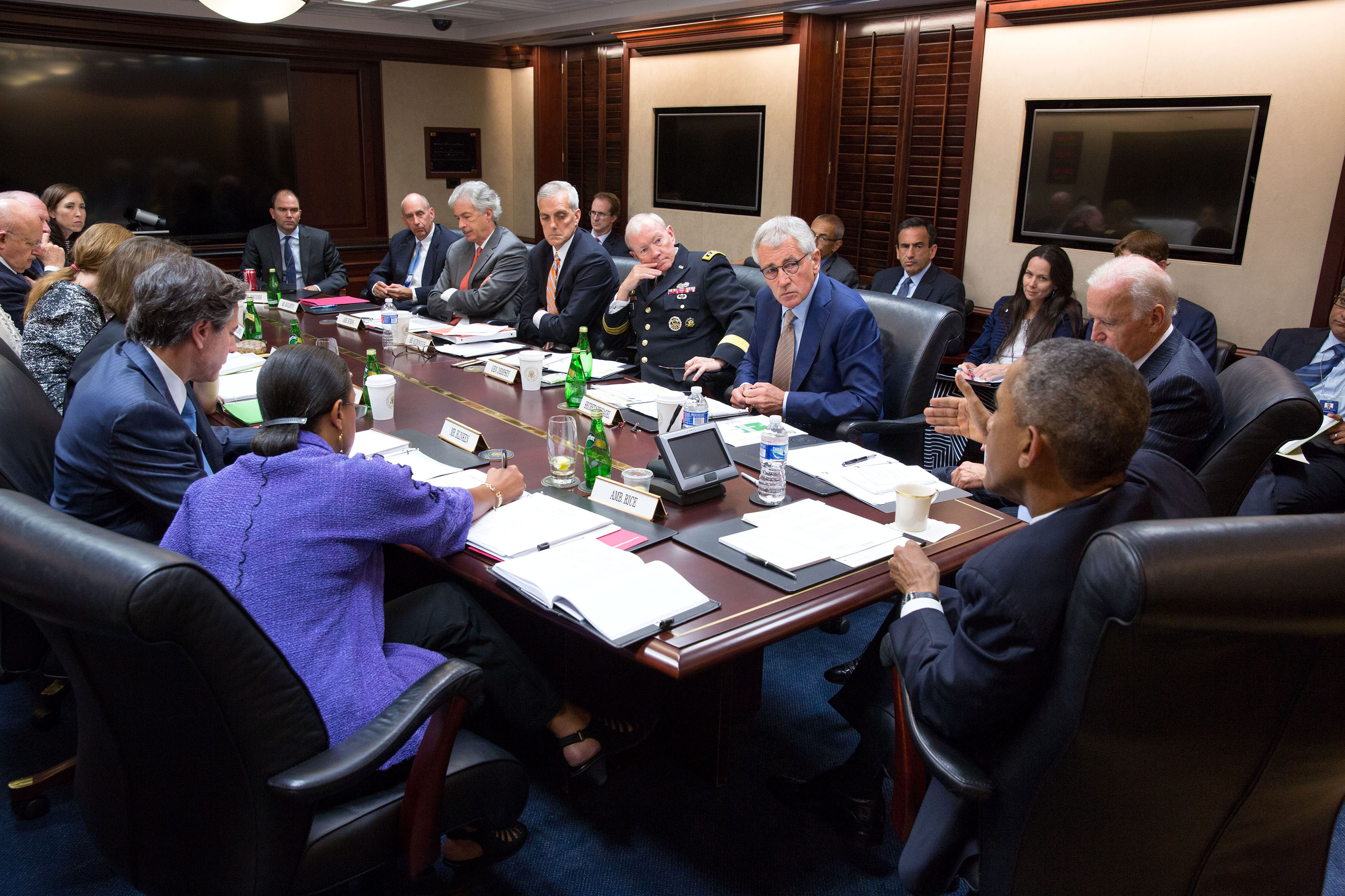
President Obama and Joe Biden meet Clapper, Rice, Brennan and other members of the National Security Council, September 10, 2014.

=== ACLU v. Clapper ===
In June 2013, the American Civil Liberties Union and the New York Civil Liberties Union filed a lawsuit against several defendants including Clapper challenging the intelligence community's bulk collection of metadata. The United States District Court for the Southern District of New York found in December 2013 that the collection did not violate the Fourth Amendment and dismissed the lawsuit. On May 7, 2015, the United States Court of Appeals for the Second Circuit ruled that Section 215 of the Patriot Act did not authorize the bulk collection of metadata, which judge Gerard E. Lynch called a "staggering" amount of information.

=== OPM hack, 2015 ===
In June 2015, the United States Office of Personnel Management (OPM) announced that it had been the target of a data breach targeting the records of as many as 18 million people. The Washington Post has reported that the attack originated in China, citing unnamed government officials.

Speaking at a forum in Washington, D.C., Clapper warned of the danger posed by a capable adversary such as the Chinese government and said, "You have to kind of salute the Chinese for what they did."

=== CENTCOM analyst allegations, 2015 ===
In August 2015, fifty intelligence analysts working for United States Central Command (CENTCOM) complained to the Pentagon's Inspector General and the media, alleging that CENTCOM's senior leadership was altering or distorting intelligence reports on the Islamic State of Iraq and the Levant (ISIL) to paint a more optimistic picture of the ongoing war against ISIL forces in Iraq and Syria. They were subsequently joined by civilian and Defense Intelligence Agency analysts working for CENTCOM. Members of the groups began anonymously leaking details of the case to the press in late August. In September 2015, The Guardian reported that according to an unknown former intelligence official, Clapper was in frequent contact with Brigadier General Steven Grove, who was said to be one of the subjects of the Inspector General's review. In February 2017, the Inspector General of the United States Department of Defense completed its investigation and cleared the senior leadership of CENTCOM, concluding that "allegations of intelligence being intentionally altered, delayed or suppressed by top CENTCOM officials from mid-2014 to mid-2015 were largely unsubstantiated."

=== Resignation, 2016 ===
In November 2016, Clapper resigned, effective at the end of President Obama's term in January 2017.

== Post-government life ==
=== Appointment to Australian National University, 2017 ===
In June 2017 Clapper commenced an initial four-week term at the Australian National University (ANU) National Security College in Canberra that includes public lectures on key global and national security issues. Clapper was also expected to take part in the ANU Crawford Australian Leadership Forum, the nation's pre-eminent dialogue of academics, parliamentarians and business leaders.

=== CNN national security analyst, 2017–present ===
In August 2017, CNN hired Clapper as a national security analyst. In May 2018, Clapper expressed his support for CIA Director-designate Gina Haspel.

=== Views on President Trump ===
In a March 2017 interview with Chuck Todd, Clapper, who had been the Director of National Intelligence under President Obama until January 20, 2017, revealed the state of his knowledge at that time:

CHUCK TODD: Were there improper contacts between the Trump campaign and Russian officials?

JAMES CLAPPER: We did not include any evidence in our report, and I say, "our", that's N.S.A., F.B.I. and C.I.A., with my office, the Director of National Intelligence, that had anything, that had any reflection of collusion between members of the Trump campaign and the Russians. There was no evidence of that...

CHUCK TODD: I understand that. But does it exist?

JAMES CLAPPER: Not to my knowledge.

Todd pressed him to elaborate.

CHUCK TODD: If [evidence of collusion] existed, it would have been in this report?

JAMES CLAPPER: This could have unfolded or become available in the time since I left the government.

Clapper had stopped receiving briefings on January 20 and was "not aware of the counterintelligence investigation Director Comey first referred to during his testimony before the House Permanent Select Committee for Intelligence on the 20th of March". CNN stated that Clapper had "taken a major defense away from the White House".

In a speech at Australia's National Press Club in June Clapper accused Trump of "ignorance or disrespect", called the firing of FBI director James Comey "inexcusable", and warned of an "internal assault on our institutions".

In June 2017, Clapper opined that Trump–Russia scandal is more serious than the Watergate scandal of the 1970s. In December 2017, Clapper said that Russian President Vladimir Putin "knows how to handle an asset, and that's what he's doing with" President Trump. In his 2018 memoir Facts and Fears: Hard Truths from a Life in Intelligence, Clapper further addressed the issue.

In an August 2017 interview, Clapper stated that U.S. President Donald Trump having access to the nuclear codes is "pretty damn scary" and he questioned his fitness to be in office.

In October 2018, Clapper, alongside several Democratic officials and other critics of Trump, was targeted by a mailed pipe bomb.

In February 2019, Clapper said he agreed with former acting FBI Director Andrew McCabe's opinion that President Donald Trump could be a "Russian asset".

In October 2020, Clapper was part of a group of 51 former intelligence officials that signed a letter that stated the Biden laptop story “has the classic earmarks of a Russian information operation". Portions of the laptop's contents have since been verified as authentic, and no such Russian linkage was found.

=== Views on Russia and the Russians ===
In May 2017, Clapper said that Russia is the primary adversary of the United States. He explained why he believes the Russians are so dangerous:

If you put that in context with everything else we knew the Russians were doing to interfere with the election, and just the historical practices of the Russians, who typically, almost genetically driven to co-opt, penetrate, gain favor, whatever, which is a typical Russian technique. So we were concerned.

In June 2017, Clapper said that "[t]he Russians are not our friends", because it is in their "genes to be opposed, diametrically opposed, to the United States and western democracies."

Clapper serves on the Advisory Board of the Committee to Investigate Russia, a nonpartisan, non-profit group formed with the intention of helping "Americans understand and recognize the scope and scale of Russia's continuing attacks on our democracy."

== In the media ==
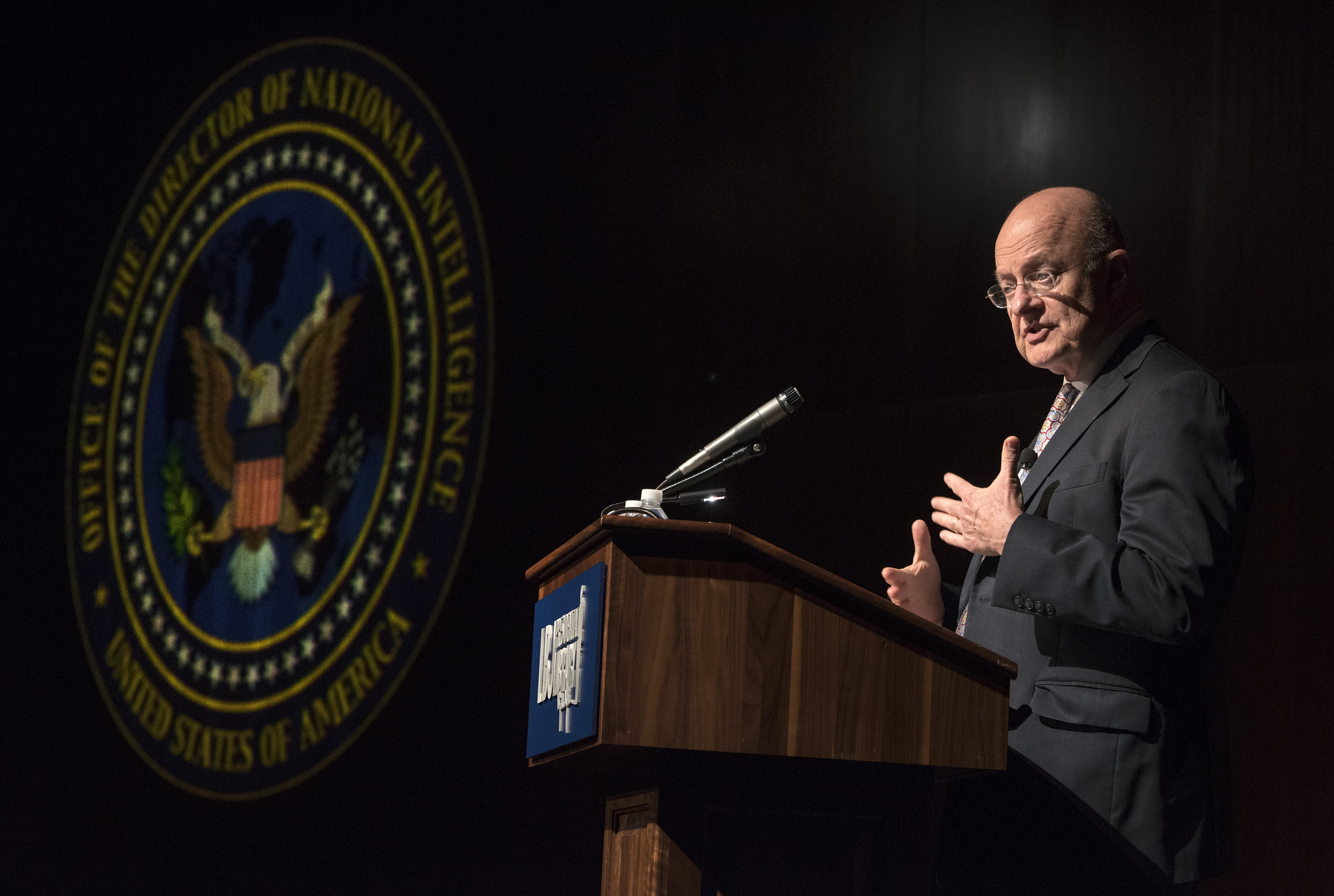
Clapper at the LBJ Presidential Library in 2016

In 2003, Clapper, then head of the National Geospatial-Intelligence Agency, attempted to explain the absence of weapons of mass destruction in Iraq by asserting that the weapons materials were "unquestionably" shipped out of Iraq to Syria and other countries just before the American invasion, a "personal assessment" that Clapper's own agency head at the time, David Burpee, "could not provide further evidence to support."

In an interview on December 20, 2010, with Diane Sawyer of ABC News, Clapper indicated he was completely unaware that 12 alleged terrorists had been arrested in Great Britain earlier that day.

In February 2011, when mass demonstrations were on the verge of toppling Hosni Mubarak's presidency in Egypt, Clapper told the House Intelligence Committee during a hearing that:

The term 'Muslim Brotherhood' ... is an umbrella term for a variety of movements, in the case of Egypt, a very heterogeneous group, largely secular, which has eschewed violence and has decried Al Qaeda as a perversion of Islam.... They have pursued social ends, a betterment of the political order in Egypt, et cetera. ... In other countries, there are also chapters or franchises of the Muslim Brotherhood, but there is no overarching agenda, particularly in pursuit of violence, at least internationally.

The Obama administration took the rare step later that day of correcting its own intelligence chief after the statement drew scrutiny among members of Congress.

In March 2011, Clapper was heard at the United States Senate Committee on Armed Services commenting on the 2011 Libyan civil war that "over the longer term" Gaddafi "will prevail". This position was loudly questioned by the White House, when National Security Adviser Thomas E. Donilon qualified his statement as a "static and one-dimensional assessment" and argued that "the lost legitimacy [of Gaddafi] matters." During the same hearing he was also questioned when he neglected to list Iran and North Korea among the nuclear powers that might pose a threat to the United States.

In February 2016, Clapper cited the activities of Russia, China, Iran, North Korea, Islamic State and "homegrown extremists" as major threats to the United States.

In March 2017, Clapper said on NBC's Meet the Press that the Office of the Director of National Intelligence had not obtained a FISA court order allowing the FBI to tap Trump Tower, rebutting Donald Trump's unsubstantiated claims that President Barack Obama personally ordered wiretapping of Trump Tower before the November election. Clapper stated "I will say that for the part of the national security apparatus that I oversaw as DNI, was there no such wiretap activity mounted against the president-elect at the time or as a candidate or against his campaign," but added that "I can't speak for other Title III authorized entities in the government or a state or local entity."

Clapper also said that he saw no evidence of collusion between the Trump campaign and Russia. He stopped receiving briefings on January 20 and was "not aware of the counterintelligence investigation Director Comey first referred to during his testimony before the House Permanent Select Committee for Intelligence on the 20th of March". CNN stated that Clapper had "taken a major defense away from the White House."

In May 2017, Clapper was criticized by some media outlets for a xenophobic remark in an interview with Chuck Todd from Meet the Press. He told NBC's Meet the Press that Russians are "almost genetically driven" to act deviously.

On October 26, 2018, the New York Times reported that an explosive device addressed to James Clapper was delivered to CNN offices in Manhattan. Federal authorities are investigating.

Clapper was portrayed by Jonathan Banks in the two part series The Comey Rule.

== Personal life ==
In 1965, Clapper married Susan Ellen Terry, a former National Security Agency employee. They have a daughter, Jennifer, who is a principal of an elementary school in Fairfax County, Virginia. They also have a son, Andrew, who is an Instructional Technology resource teacher for Hidden Valley High School in Roanoke, Virginia.

Clapper has a brother, Mike Clapper of Illinois, and a sister, Chris. He introduced them at his Senate confirmation hearings on July 20, 2010.

In the 2024 United States presidential election, Clapper endorsed Kamala Harris.

== Education ==
- 1963 Bachelor of Science degree in political science, University of Maryland
- 1970 Master of Arts degree in political science, St. Mary's University, Texas
- 1973 Air Command and Staff College, Maxwell Air Force Base, Montgomery, Alabama
- 1975 Distinguished graduate, Armed Forces Staff College, Norfolk, Virginia
- 1976 Air War College, Maxwell Air Force Base, Montgomery, Alabama
- 1979 National War College, Fort Lesley J. McNair, Washington, D.C.
- 1990 Program for Senior Executives in National and International Security, Harvard University, Cambridge, Massachusetts
- 1990 Harvard Defense Policy Seminar, Harvard University, Cambridge, Massachusetts

Clapper also holds an honorary doctorate in strategic intelligence from the Joint Military Intelligence College, Washington, D.C., where he taught as an adjunct professor.

== Awards and decorations ==
=== Military awards ===
Air Force Basic Officer Aircrew Badge
Basic Space and Missile Badge
Basic Missile Maintenance Badge
Office of the Joint Chiefs of Staff Identification Badge

Defense Distinguished Service Medal
Air Force Distinguished Service Medal
Defense Superior Service Medal
Legion of Merit with two bronze oak leaf clusters
Bronze Star with oak leaf cluster
Defense Meritorious Service Medal
Meritorious Service Medal with oak leaf cluster
Air Medal with oak leaf cluster
Joint Service Commendation Medal
Air Force Commendation Medal
Air Force Outstanding Unit Award with Valor device and two oak leaf clusters
Air Force Organizational Excellence Award
National Intelligence Distinguished Service Medal
Department of Defense Distinguished Civilian Service Award
National Defense Service Medal with one bronze service star
Vietnam Service Medal with three service stars
Air Force Overseas Short Tour Service Ribbon with two oak leaf clusters
Air Force Overseas Long Tour Service Ribbon with two oak leaf clusters
Air Force Longevity Service Award with one silver and two bronze oak leaf clusters
Small Arms Expert Marksmanship Ribbon
Air Force Training Ribbon
Republic of Korea Order of National Security Merit, Cheon-su Medal
French National Order of Merit (Commander)
Officer of the Order of Australia (Honorary – Military Division) – October 5, 2012
Royal Norwegian Order of Merit (Commander with Star)
Grand Cordon of the Order of the Rising Sun
Vietnam Gallantry Cross Unit Citation
Vietnam Campaign Medal

=== Other awards ===
- William Oliver Baker Award of the Intelligence and National Security Alliance, 2006
- Rosemary Award from the National Security Archive at George Washington University for the "worst open government performance of 2013."

== Dates of promotion ==
Insignia	Rank	Date
	Lieutenant General	November 15, 1991
	Major General	September 1, 1988
	Brigadier General	October 1, 1985
	Colonel	February 11, 1980
	Lieutenant Colonel	April 1, 1976
	Major	November 1, 1973
	Captain	March 16, 1967
	First Lieutenant	January 8, 1965
	Second Lieutenant	June 8, 1963

== Military assignments ==
- May 1963 – March 1964, student, Signal Intelligence Officers Course, Goodfellow Air Force Base, Texas
- March 1964 – December 1965, analytic branch chief of Air Force Special Communications Center, Kelly Air Force Base, Texas
- December 1965 – December 1966, watch officer and air defense analyst, 2nd Air Division (later, 7th Air Force), Tan Son Nhut Air Base, South Vietnam
- December 1966 – June 1970, aide to the commander and command briefer, Air Force Security Service, Kelly Air Force Base, Texas
- June 1970 – June 1971, commander of Detachment 3, 6994th Security Squadron, Nakhon Phanom Royal Thai Air Force Base, Thailand
- June 1971 – August 1973, military assistant to the director of the National Security Agency, Fort George G. Meade, Maryland
- August 1973 – August 1974, aide to the commander and intelligence staff officer, Headquarters Air Force Systems Command, Andrews Air Force Base, Maryland
- August 1974 – September 1975, distinguished graduate, Armed Forces Staff College, Norfolk, Virginia
- September 1975 – June 1976, chief, signal intelligence branch, Headquarters U.S. Pacific Command, Camp H.M. Smith, Hawaii
- June 1976 – August 1978, chief, signal intelligence branch, J-23, Headquarters U.S. Pacific Command, Camp H.M. Smith, Hawaii
- August 1978 – June 1979, student, National War College, National Defense University, Fort Lesley J. McNair, Washington, D.C.
- June 1979 – January 1980, Washington area representative for electronic security command, deputy commander of Fort George G. Meade, Maryland
- February 1980 – April 1981, commander of 6940th Electronic Security Wing, Fort George G. Meade, Maryland
- April 1981 – June 1984, director for intelligence plans and systems, Office of the Assistant Chief of Staff for Intelligence, Headquarters U.S. Air Force, Washington, D.C.
- June 1984 – May 1985, commander of Air Force Technical Applications Center, Patrick Air Force Base, Florida
- June 1985 – June 1987, assistant chief of staff for intelligence, U.S. Forces Korea, and deputy assistant chief of staff for intelligence, Republic of Korea and U.S. Combined Forces Command
- July 1987 – July 1989, director for intelligence, Headquarters U.S. Pacific Command, Camp H.M. Smith, Hawaii
- July 1989 – March 1990, deputy chief of staff for intelligence, Headquarters Strategic Air Command, Offutt Air Force Base, Neb.
- April 1990 – November 1991, assistant chief of staff for intelligence, Headquarters U.S. Air Force, Washington, D.C.
- November 1991 – 1995, director of the Defense Intelligence Agency and General Defense Intelligence Program, Washington, D.C.

== Books ==
External videos
- After Words interview with Clapper on Facts and Fears, May 26, 2018, C-SPAN

- James R. Clapper with Trey Brown (2018). Facts and Fears: Hard Truths from a Life in Intelligence. New York: Viking. ISBN 978-0525558644. OCLC 1006804896.

== See also ==
- Michael Hayden, retired Air Force general and former director of the NSA (1999–2005) and CIA (2006–2009)

Government offices
Preceded by Dennis Nagy; Acting	Director of the Defense Intelligence Agency; 1991–1995	Succeeded by Kenneth Minihan
Preceded by James C. King	Director of the National Geospatial-Intelligence Agency; 2001–2006	Succeeded by Robert Murrett
Preceded by David Gompert; Acting	Director of National Intelligence; 2010–2017	Succeeded by Stephanie O'Sullivan; Acting
Political offices
Preceded by Stephen Cambone	Under Secretary of Defense for Intelligence; 2007–2010	Succeeded by Michael Vickers
