= Stephanie O'Sullivan =

American intelligence officer

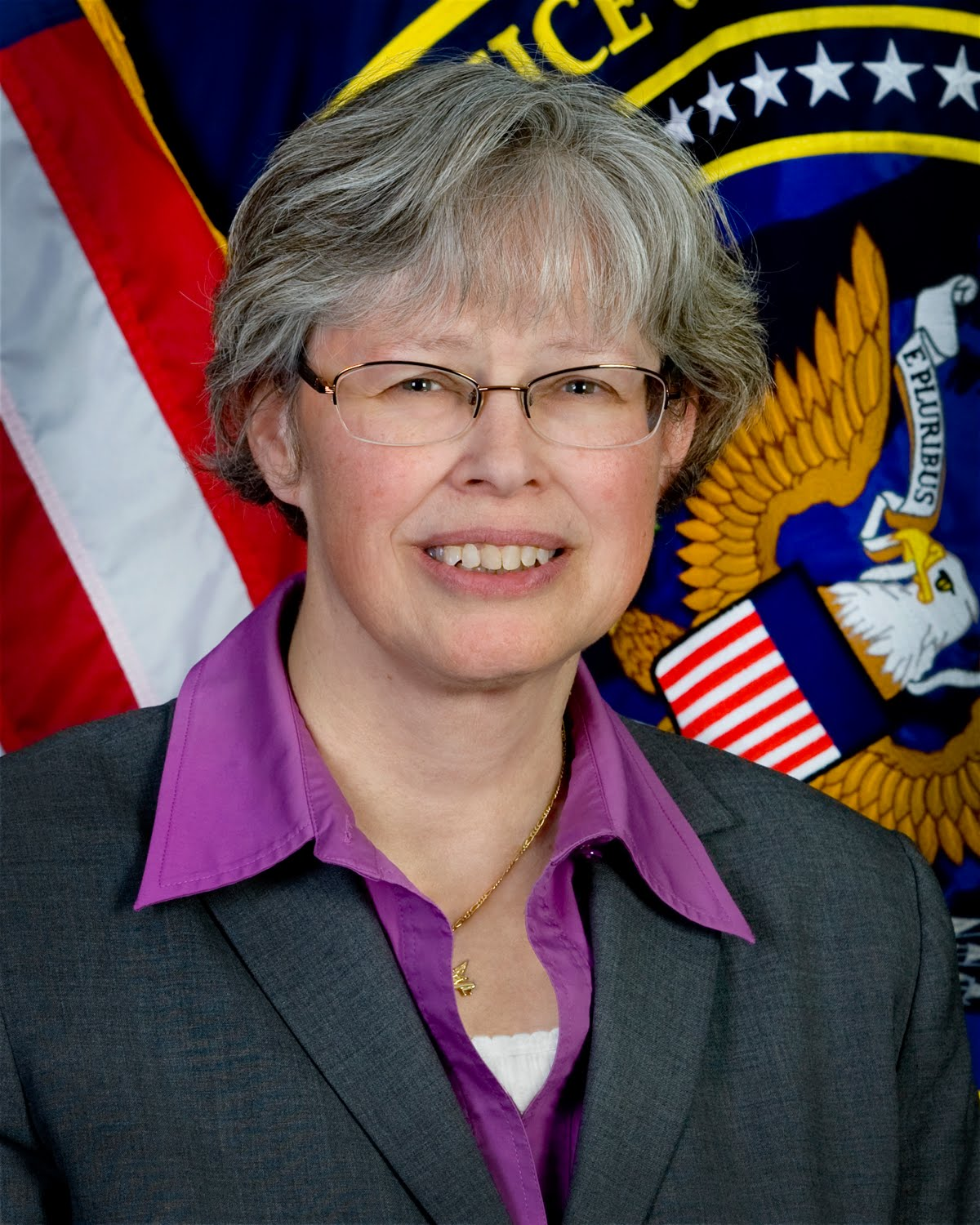

Acting Director of National Intelligence
- In office January 20, 2017
- President: Donald Trump
- Preceded by: James R. Clapper
- Succeeded by: Mike Dempsey (acting)

4th Principal Deputy Director of National Intelligence
- In office February 18, 2011 – January 20, 2017
- President: Barack Obama
- Director: James R. Clapper
- Preceded by: David Gompert
- Succeeded by: Susan M. Gordon

Personal details
- Born: October 3, 1959 (age 66) Cape Girardeau, Missouri, U.S.
- Education: Missouri University of Science and Technology (BS)

Stephanie O'Sullivan (born October 3, 1959) is a former Principal Deputy Director of National Intelligence (PDDNI) who was appointed to that position on February 18, 2011. She worked to assist the Director of National Intelligence (DNI) in managing the day-to-day operations of the intelligence community. Prior to serving as PDDNI, she served as a senior leader at the Central Intelligence Agency (CIA), rising to the Associate Deputy Director of the CIA before being confirmed as the PDDNI.

== Prior career ==
She served as the Associate Deputy Director of the CIA from December 2009 to February 2011. Before that position, Ms. O'Sullivan headed CIA's Directorate of Science and Technology for 4 years. In that role, she managed the CIA's technological innovation and support to case officer operations. In all, Ms. O'Sullivan spent over 14 years, combined in the Directorate of Science and Technology. Before the CIA, she worked in the Office of Naval Intelligence and at TRW, which is now part of Northrop Grumman.

== Principal Deputy Director of National Intelligence ==
=== Nomination ===
She was nominated by President Barack Obama on January 5, 2011, at the recommendation of Director James R. Clapper. On February 15, 2011, the Senate Intelligence Committee voted unanimously to recommend O'Sullivan's confirmation to the Senate, which later unanimously confirmed her.

== Career after public service ==
In November 2020, O'Sullivan was named a volunteer member of the Joe Biden presidential transition Agency Review Team to support transition efforts related to the United States Intelligence Community.

== Education ==
- Missouri University of Science and Technology
  - Bachelor of Science in Civil engineering

Government offices
Preceded by James R. Clapper	Director of National Intelligence; Acting; 2017	Succeeded by Mike Dempsey; Acting
