= Robert B. Murrett =

American academic (born 1952)

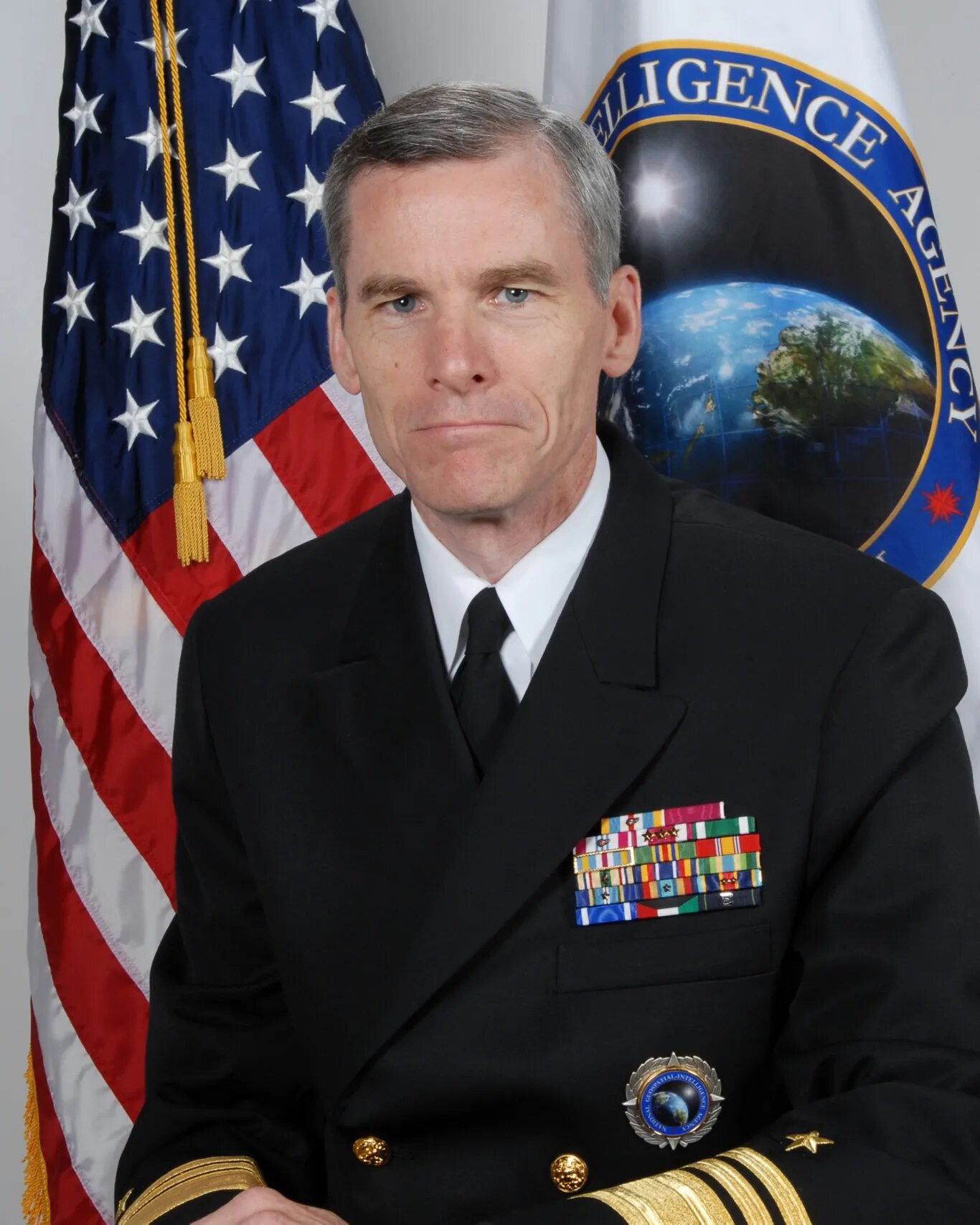

4th Director of the National Geospatial-Intelligence Agency
- In office July 2006 – July 2010
- President: George W. Bush; Barack Obama
- Preceded by: James R. Clapper
- Succeeded by: Letitia Long

Director of the Office of Naval Intelligence
- In office 2005–2006
- President: George W. Bush
- Preceded by: Richard B. Porterfield
- Succeeded by: Tony L. Cothron

Personal details
- Born: October 8, 1952 (age 73)
- Education: University at Buffalo (BA); Georgetown University (MA); National Intelligence University (MSSI)

Military service
- Branch/service: United States Navy
- Years of service: 1976-2010
- Rank: Vice Admiral

Robert Brendan Murrett (born October 8, 1952) is an American academic, intelligence officer, and retired Vice Admiral in the United States Navy. He was the fourth Director of the National Geospatial-Intelligence Agency, serving from July 2006 through July 2010. In 2011, Murrett joined the Institute for Security Policy and Law at Syracuse University where he now serves as deputy director. He is also a faculty member at the Maxwell School of Citizenship and Public Affairs, and serves on the Institute for Veterans and Military Families (IVMF) advisory board at Syracuse University.

== Military career ==
Following his commissioning into the United States Navy, Murrett was assigned as an afloat intelligence officer, including Mediterranean, North Atlantic, and western Pacific deployments aboard Kitty Hawk, America, and Independence

Following assignment to the Defense Intelligence College in 1980, Murrett was detailed to the Chief of Naval Operations Intelligence Plot (OP-009U) as a watch stander and briefing officer for Navy civilian and military leaders. From 1983 to 1985, he served as Assistant Intelligence Officer for Commander, Second Fleet. He participated in deployments to the North Atlantic, the European theater, and Caribbean aboard Mount Whitney and Nassau. Between 1986 and 1989, Murrett was assigned as Assistant Naval Attaché to the U.S. Embassy in Oslo, Norway.

In 1989, Murrett reported to Commander in Chief, U.S. Pacific Fleet, where he was assigned as Operational Intelligence Officer. From 1992 to 1995, he served as Assistant Chief of Staff, Intelligence for Commander, Carrier Group Eight, and deployed to the European and Central Command theaters aboard Theodore Roosevelt. Murrett was also assigned as J2 CJTF 120 aboard Wasp for operations in the Caribbean.

Between 1995 and 1997, Murrett was Assistant Chief of Staff, Intelligence for Commander, Second Fleet and served concurrently as N2 for NATO's Striking Fleet Atlantic and as J2 for U.S. Atlantic Command's CJTF 120. From June 1997 until September 1998, he was assigned to the Chief of Naval Operations Staff as Executive Assistant to the Director of Naval Intelligence. Murrett was then assigned as Director, Intelligence Directorate, Office of Naval Intelligence in September 1998. Murrett assumed the duties of Commander, Atlantic Intelligence Command (AIC) on 12 August 1999. He was responsible for the transition of AIC to Joint Forces Intelligence Command in October 1999. Murrett served as the Director for Intelligence, U.S. Joint Forces Command, from 10 August 2000 through 25 January 2002. From 31 January 2002 through March 2005, Murrett was assigned as the Vice Director for Intelligence, J2, on the Joint Staff. He served as the Director of Naval Intelligence from 1 April 2005 to 7 July 2006, when he became the director for the National Geospatial-Intelligence Agency.

== Education and training ==
Murrett received his bachelor's degree in history from the University at Buffalo in 1975, and master's degrees in government and strategic intelligence from Georgetown University and the Defense Intelligence College, respectively.

== Personal ==
In the 2024 United States presidential election, Murrett endorsed Kamala Harris.

Military offices
Preceded by James R. Clapper	Director of the National Geospatial-Intelligence Agency; 2006–2010	Succeeded by Letitia Long
Preceded by Richard B. Porterfield	Director of the Office of Naval Intelligence; 2005–2006	Succeeded by Tony L. Cothron
