= Robert Cardillo =

American intelligence official

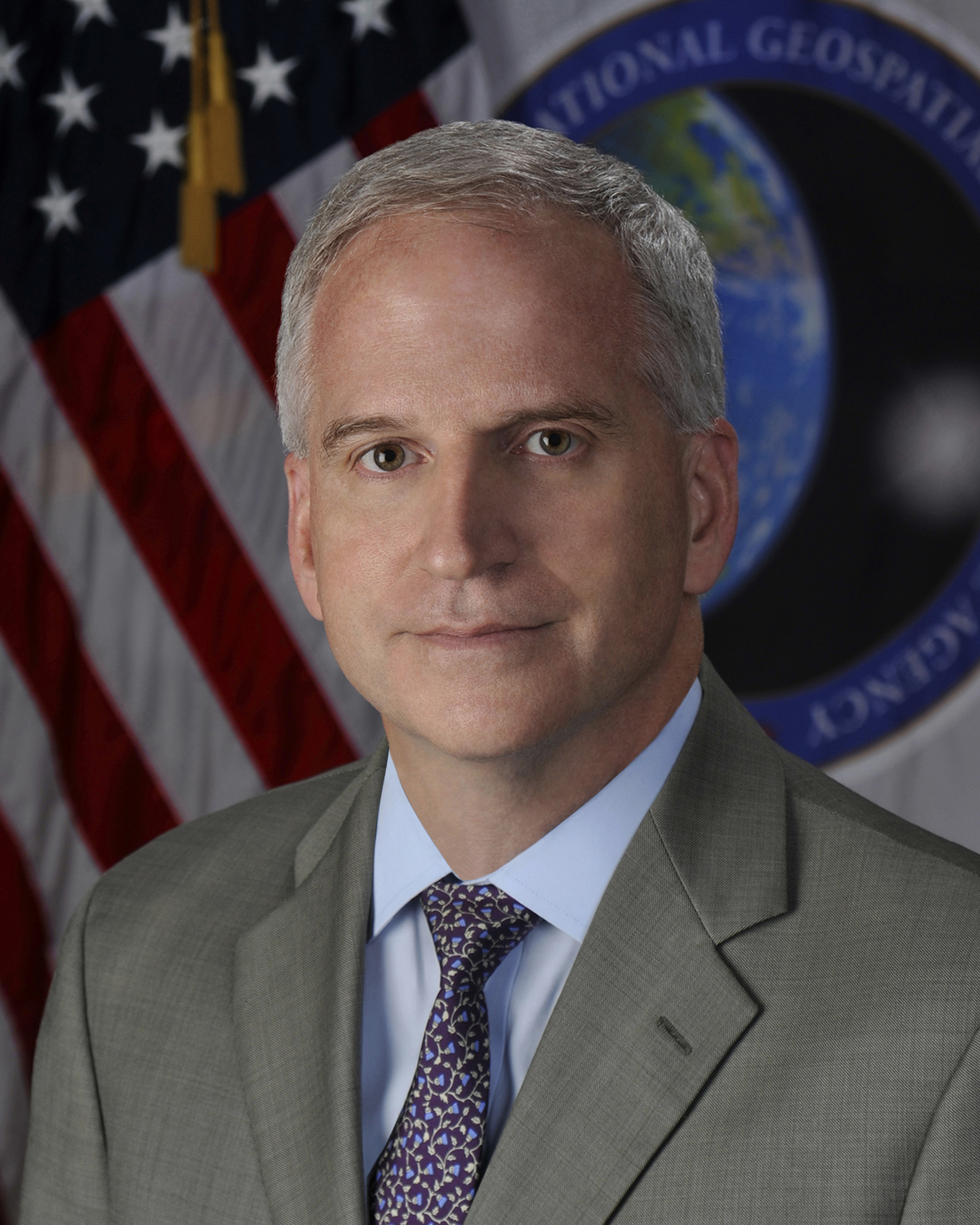

6th Director of the National Geospatial-Intelligence Agency
- In office October 3, 2014 – February 7, 2019
- President: Barack Obama; Donald Trump
- Deputy: Justin Poole
- Preceded by: Letitia Long
- Succeeded by: Robert D. Sharp

Deputy Director of the Defense Intelligence Agency
- In office April 19, 2010 – August 31, 2010
- President: Barack Obama
- Preceded by: Letitia Long
- Succeeded by: David Shedd

Personal details
- Education: Smoky Hill High School; Cornell University (BA); Georgetown University (MA)

Robert Cardillo is a Distinguished Fellow at Georgetown University’s Center for Security and Emerging Technology. Prior to this appointment, he was the sixth Director of the National Geospatial-Intelligence Agency and was sworn in October 3, 2014. He was previously selected by Director of National Intelligence James Clapper to serve as the first Deputy Director of National Intelligence for Intelligence Integration in September 2010. Clapper said in a statement that the position would "elevate information sharing and collaboration" between those who collect intelligence and those who analyze it. Cardillo previously served as deputy director of the Defense Intelligence Agency (DIA). Prior to that, he served as the deputy director for Analysis, DIA, and Director, Analysis and Production, National Geospatial-Intelligence Agency (NGA).

== Early life and education ==
Cardillo earned a Bachelor of Arts in Government from Cornell University in 1983 and a Master of Arts in National Security Studies from Georgetown University in 1988. He is an alumnus of the Council for Excellence in Government, the Joint Chiefs of Staff Capstone Course, and Harvard University's Program for Senior Managers in Government. Cardillo is the recipient of the Presidential Rank of Distinguished Executive, Presidential Rank of Meritorious Executive, Vice President's Hammer Award, the Chairman of the Joint Chiefs of Staff Joint Meritorious Civilian Service Award, DIA's Analyst of the Year, Director DIA's Intelligence Award, and the NGA's Distinguished Civilian Service Award.

== Intelligence career ==
Cardillo began his career with the DIA in 1983 as an imagery analyst. In May 2000 he was selected to join the Defense Intelligence Senior Executive Service. Throughout his career, he has served in a variety of leadership positions within the Intelligence Community. He led NGA's Analysis and Production Directorate and Source Operations and Management Directorate from 2002 to 2006 and also led NGA's Congressional Affairs, Public Affairs, and Corporate Relations sections. From 2006 to 2010, Cardillo served as deputy director of the Defense Intelligence Agency as a whole and deputy director for analysis, leading DIA's Directorate for Analysis. In summer 2009, he served as the Acting J2, a first for a civilian, in support of the Chairman of the Joint Chiefs of Staff. From 2010 to 2014, Cardillo served as the inaugural Deputy Director of National Intelligence for Intelligence Integration

=== Director of the National Geospatial-Intelligence Agency ===
Cardillo became the sixth NGA director in October 2014 and served until his retirement in February 2019.

==== Controversy ====
In 2015, Cardillo invited American men's college basketball coach Bobby Knight, a friend of his from their time at the United States Military Academy at West Point, New York, to deliver an address to the NGA workforce on leadership. Knight visited the agency, and was then accused by four female NGA employees of inappropriate behavior and physical contact. The result was a Federal Bureau of Investigation (FBI) and (CID) United States Army Criminal Investigation Division (CID) investigation into the matter. The FBI and CID did not bring charges and Federal authorities closed the cases. The incident was a concern that affected agency employee engagement and morale.

== After NGA ==
In May 2019, Cardillo was named a Distinguished Geospatial Fellow at Saint Louis University in which he will advise on strategy for geospatial growth in St. Louis. His role includes advising the growth of GeoSLU, Saint Louis University's geospatial research, training, and innovation initiative, and advising the Cortex Innovation Community on geospatial strategy, innovation, and commercialization.

In March 2021, Cardillo was elected as chairman of the Board of the United States Geospatial Intelligence Foundation USGIF.

In April 2021, Cardillo joined Planet Federal as chairman of the board and Chief Strategist. Planet Federal is a division of Earth imaging company Planet Labs dealing with federal contracts; it has ties to the Intelligence Community and is a satellite imagery vendor to the community through NGA and NRO. He joined the board of directors of Synthetaic in May 2023.

As of 2024, Cardillo serves on the advisory board of the National Security Space Association.

In September 2025, IonQ appointed Cardillo executive chairman of IonQ Federal, an organization created to combine the company's government-facing quantum computing and networking work.

== Personal life ==
A runner who has completed five Marine Corps Marathons, Cardillo resides in Alexandria, Virginia. As of 2014, he had a wife, three children, and two grandchildren.
