= Tony L. Cothron =

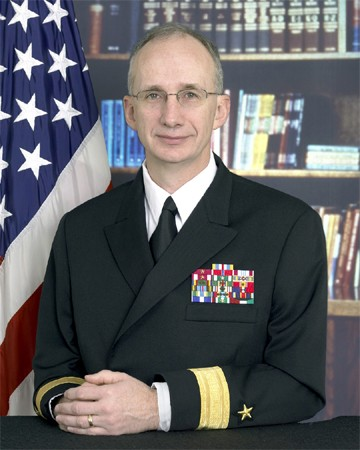
- Born: May 15, 1955 (age 71); Carthage, Tennessee, U.S.
- Military career
- Allegiance: United States of America
- Branch: United States Navy
- Service years: 1978-2008
- Rank: Rear Admiral
- Conflicts: Operation Desert Storm
- Awards: Defense Superior Service Medal; Legion of Merit (3); Bronze Star

Rear Admiral Tony Lee Cothron was the Director of Intelligence for the Chief of Naval Operations and the 62nd Director of Naval Intelligence. He is currently a professor at Liberty University.

== Biography ==
=== Early years ===
A native of Greenbrier, Tennessee, Cothron graduated from Middle Tennessee State University in 1977 and was commissioned through Aviation Officer Candidate School in 1978.

=== Tours ===
His operational tours include positions of increasing responsibility in intelligence aboard the USS America, Patron Squadron Special Projects Unit One (VPU-1), Carrier Airwing Eight (CVW-8) aboard the USS Theodore Roosevelt for combat operations during Operation Desert Storm and Kurdish relief operations in northern Iraq during Operation Provide Comfort, Command Cruiser Destroyer Group Two aboard the USS George Washington, and as Assistant Chief of Staff of Intelligence for Commander, Sixth Fleet in Gaeta, Italy where he participated in Operation Allied Force combat operations against the Federal Republic of Yugoslavia.

His tours ashore have included duty as a submarine analyst and watch stander at Fleet Ocean Surveillance Intelligence Center Detachment (FOSIC Det), Atlantic Fleet; as an instructor at the Fleet Intelligence Training Center Atlantic and member of the Soviet Seapower Education Program; as Senior Watch Analyst, Pacific and Strategic Forces Division Head at the Navy Operational Intelligence Command (NAVOPINTCEN), Chief of the Atlantic Intelligence Command's Current Intelligence Division and Functional Manager for Imagery and ELINT during Operation Uphold Democracy, the US intervention in Haiti; as the Targeting Requirements Branch Head on the Navy staff for CNO N2; and as the Director, Fleet Intelligence for Commander, Fleet Forces Command.

=== 2001 - 2003 ===
Cothron commanded the U.S. European Command's Joint Analysis Center at RAF Molesworth, UK from August 2001 to July 2003, transforming the command in response to the Global War on Terrorism and supporting combat operations against Iraq during Operation Iraqi Freedom. He also commanded the Navy's national level, operational intelligence and scientific and intelligence analysis center, the Office of Naval Intelligence from September 2004 to January 2006. Upon his promotion to flag rank, Rear Admiral Cothron was assigned to the National Security Agency as the Deputy Director of Signals Intelligence for Customer Relationships.

=== Professional Military Education and Qualifications ===
Rear Admiral Cothron has completed Armed Forces Air Intelligence Training, is a graduate of the Naval War College in Newport, Rhode Island, with a Master of Arts Degree in National Security and Strategic Studies and he is a graduate of the Armed Forces Staff College. He has also earned the designation of Joint Specialty Officer.

=== Awards ===
Rear Admiral Cothron's awards include the Defense Superior Service Medal, Legion of Merit (3 awards), Bronze Star, Defense Meritorious Service Medal, Meritorious Service Medal (2 awards) and the Navy Commendation Medal (six awards).

- Defense Superior Service Medal
- Legion of Merit with two gold stars
- Bronze Star
- Defense Meritorious Service Medal
- Meritorious Service Medal with one gold star
- Navy and Marine Corps Commendation Medal with one silver star

Military offices
| Preceded by Robert B. Murrett | Director of the Office of Naval Intelligence; 2006–2008 | Succeeded by David J. Dorsett |
