= Mike Dempsey (intelligence) =

American Director of National Intelligence

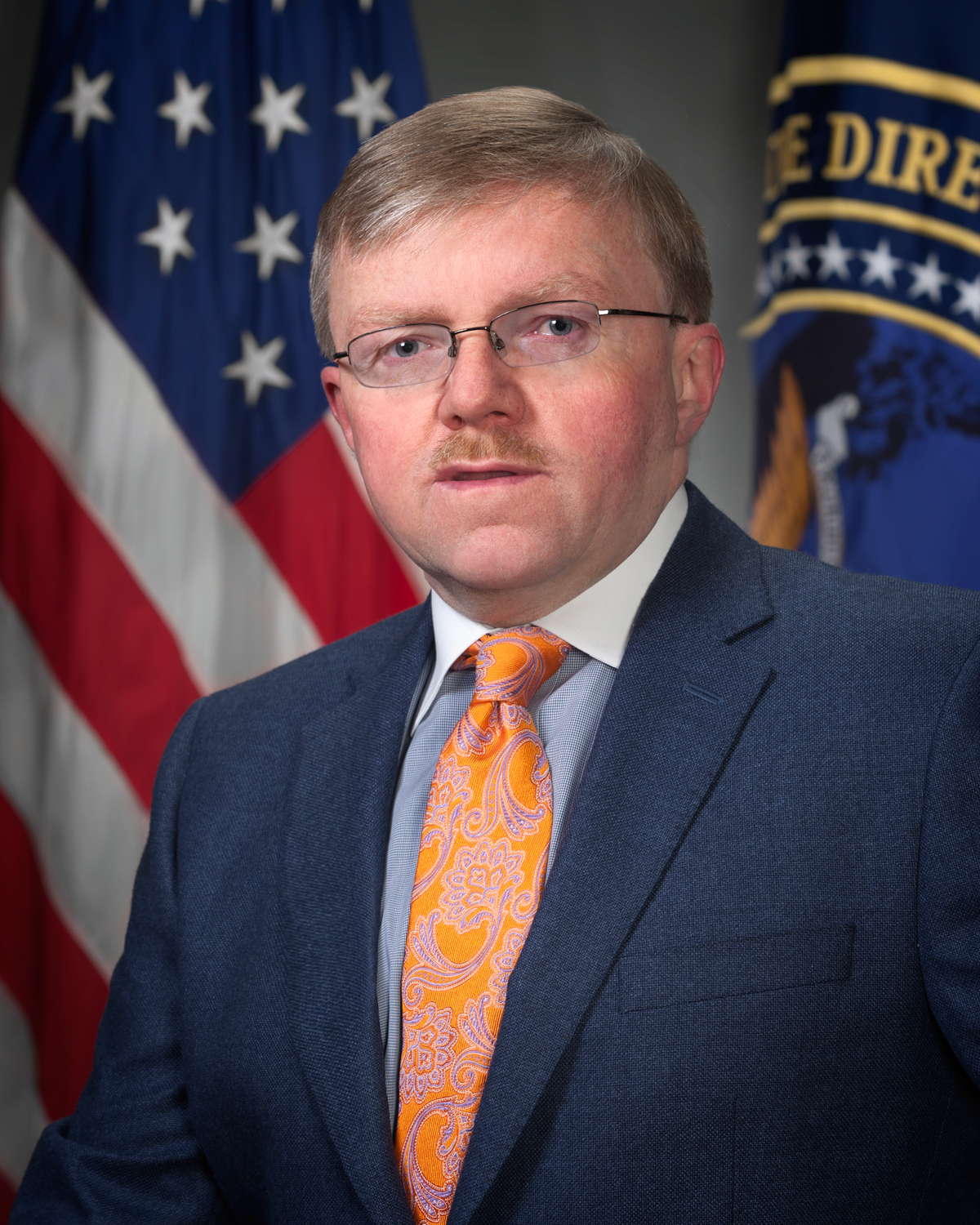

Director of National Intelligence
- Acting
- In office January 20, 2017 – March 16, 2017
- President: Donald Trump
- Preceded by: Stephanie O'Sullivan (acting)
- Succeeded by: Dan Coats

Deputy Director of National Intelligence for Intelligence Integration
- In office August 1, 2014 – March 16, 2017
- President: Barack Obama; Donald Trump

Personal details
- Education: Siena College (BA); State University of New York, Albany (MA); Johns Hopkins University (MPA)

Military service
- Allegiance: United States
- Branch/service: United States Army
- Years of service: 1986-1990
- Unit: 101st Airborne Division

Michael P. Dempsey is a former acting Director of National Intelligence, serving from January 20, 2017 to March 16, 2017.

== Biography ==
Previously, Dempsey served as the deputy director of national intelligence and President Obama's primary intelligence briefer from 2014 to 2017. In this role, he led the integration of the US intelligence community's 16 agencies. Dempsey also regularly participated in National Security Council, Principal, and Deputy Committee meetings and presented congressional testimony.

Dempsey is a member of the Council on Foreign Relations (CFR). Formerly CFR's National Intelligence Fellow, Dempsey published 45 articles in more than a dozen publications, including Foreign Affairs, Foreign Policy, Bloomberg, CNN, WIRED, Harvard Business Review, Washington Post, Wall Street Journal, and the New York Times.

Dempsey is currently vice president of government affairs for space, cyber, and intelligence at Northrop Grumman. He is also a non-resident research scholar at Columbia University.

== Selected publications ==
- "No Longer A Haven for International Terrorists", New York Times
- Dempsey, Michael (September 13, 2017). "How the US Can Counter Threats from DIY Weapons and Automation". Wired.
- "The News from Yemen is Terrible - Let's Focus on What Can be Achieved", Washington Post
- "Remaining Objective is Hard, But the Best Leaders Figure Out How to Do it", Harvard Business Review
- "A Better Guide to National Security Decision-Making", War on the Rocks
- "The Making of a Career Intelligence Official", War on the Rocks
- "The Black Swans of 2018", Politico
- "Winning the National Security Long Game Takes Technology Innovation", The Hill

Government offices
Preceded by Stephanie O'Sullivan; Acting	Director of National Intelligence; Acting; 2017	Succeeded by Dan Coats
