= Dennis M. Nagy =

American air force lieutenant (1943–2023)

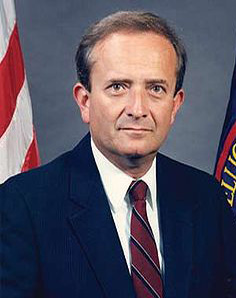
- Born: May 22, 1943; Indiana, Pennsylvania, U.S.
- Died: August 5, 2023 (aged 80)
- Military career
- Allegiance: United States
- Branch: USAF 1965–1966, DIA 1969–1991
- Service years: USAF 1965–1966, DIA 1969–1991
- Rank: 2nd Lieutenant
- Commands: Acting Director, Defense Intelligence Agency

Dennis Mark Nagy (May 22, 1943 – August 5, 2023) was an American intelligence analyst who was acting Director of the Defense Intelligence Agency from September 1991 to November 1991.

== Background ==
Nagy, who was of Hungarian ancestry, attended the United States Air Force Academy and graduated in 1965 with a bachelor of science degree in international relations and a commission in the U.S. Air Force as 2nd Lt. He served as a pilot in the Air Force from 1965 to 1966, then attended graduate school at Georgetown University in International Relations. He began at the Defense Intelligence Agency in July 1969 as an intelligence analyst.

== First assignment ==
His first permanent assignment was in 1970 with the newly formed Directorate of Estimates (DE). During a succession of progressively responsible assignments in DE, Nagy focused on Soviet strategic nuclear and space forces and on policy and doctrinal issues; he was the principal drafter of numerous departmental and national estimates. His service with DE culminated in being selected twice by the Director of Central Intelligence’s National Intelligence Officer for Strategic Programs as manager of the annual National Intelligence Estimate for Soviet Strategic Nuclear Forces. In late 1980, Nagy became a DIA executive and was selected to be the first deputy vice director for overall management of program development for estimative, basic, and scientific and technical intelligence production. During several extended periods, Nagy served as the acting vice director.

== Soviet Military Power ==
In 1981, Nagy personally directed the development of the first issue of Soviet Military Power, DoD’s annual publication on Soviet military policies and forces. In September 1982, Nagy became a charter member of the Defense Intelligence Senior Executive Service. In 1985, Nagy was appointed to the position of Assistant Deputy Director for Research. In this capacity, he held the position of chief of the Directorate for Research (DB), DIA’s largest single military intelligence production organization. He also served as the General Defense Intelligence Program (GDIP) functional manager for general military intelligence and as the chairman of the Council of Defense Intelligence Producers and the Military Targeting Committee. From there, Nagy was appointed to the position of executive director, DIA, elevating him to the Agency’s command element and ranking him as the Agency’s senior civilian. Nagy was appointed deputy director and became acting director in September 1991.

== Director ==
Nagy was appointed acting director for the interim period from September through November 1991, the first civilian ever placed in that position. As acting director, he provided continuity during a critical time when decrements against Agency resources caused reconsideration of many managerial issues and review of traditional threat priorities throughout the Defense Intelligence Community. He served until Lieutenant General James R. Clapper, Jr., USAF, assumed the directorship.

== Death ==
Dennis M. Nagy died on August 5, 2023, at the age of 80.
