= Kari Bingen =

American policy analyst

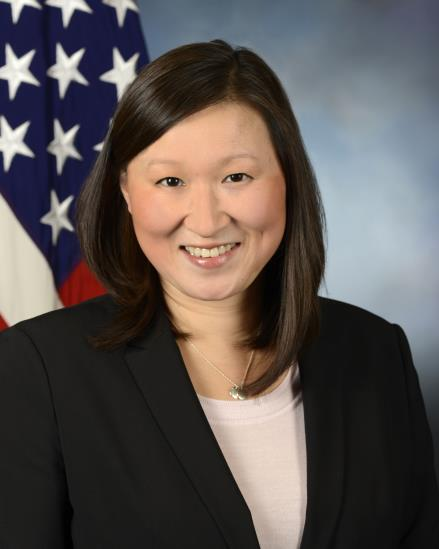

Principal Deputy Under Secretary of Defense for Intelligence and Security
- In office June 5, 2017 – January 10, 2020
- President: Donald Trump
- Preceded by: Marcel Lettre
- Succeeded by: Milancy Harris (2023)

Under Secretary of Defense for Intelligence Acting
- In office June 5, 2017 – December 1, 2017
- Preceded by: Todd Lowery
- Succeeded by: Joseph D. Kernan

Personal details
- Party: Republican
- Education: Massachusetts Institute of Technology (BS)

Kari Bingen is an American policy analyst and former government official who served as Principal Deputy Under Secretary of Defense for Intelligence during the Trump Administration.

== Education ==
Bingen earned bachelor's degree in aeronautics and astronautics from the Massachusetts Institute of Technology in 1999.

== Career ==
Bingen began her career as a space policy analyst at The Aerospace Corporation and an engineer at SRA International. Then, Bingen served as a staff member of the United States House Committee on Armed Services (HASC), where she later served on the strategic forces subcommittee and as the HASC's policy director.

She was confirmed unanimously by the U.S. Senate on May 25, 2017, and sworn in on June 5, 2017. According to a Pentagon spokesman, Bingen resigned on December 5, 2019, and left the Pentagon on January 10, 2020.

After leaving the Trump Administration Bingen joined HawkEye 360 as the chief strategy officer in February 2021. In August 2022, she joined the Center for Strategic and International Studies as the director of the Aerospace Security Project and a senior fellow in the International Security Program.

As of 2024, Bingen serves on the advisory board of the National Security Space Association.
