= United States Geospatial Intelligence Foundation =

Educational foundation in Virginia

- Abbreviation: USGIF
- Formation: January 22, 2004
- Type: Non-profit
- Purpose: Industry association for Geospatial Intelligence community
- Headquarters: Virginia
- Location: Herndon, Virginia
- Chief Executive Officer: Ronda Schrenk
- Chairman of the Board: Robert Cardillo
- Website: https://www.usgif.org/

The United States Geospatial Intelligence Foundation (USGIF) is a 501(c)(3) non-profit educational foundation in Virginia.

== History ==
The United States Geospatial Intelligence Foundation was created in January 2004 by a group of tradecraft professionals recognizing the need for a forum where they could work together.

== GEOINT Symposium ==
The GEOINT Symposium was described by Tim Shorrock as "one of the few open windows into the thinking at the highest levels of US intelligence", as it "has become the nation's showcase for intelligence contractors and agencies alike...". In his book Spies for Hire: The Secret World of Intelligence Outsourcing, Shorrock recounts several notable events at GEOINT Symposiums. Among them, in 2004, the Symposium featured the directors of the CIA, the NSA, and the NGA speaking at a public session at the same time—the only occasion during the presidency of George W. Bush when such a public collective gathering would occur. He also notes that, in 2005, Deputy Director of National Intelligence for Collection Mary Margaret Graham inadvertently revealed the amount of money spent by the US government on national intelligence, the first time the budget amount had been revealed since 1998.

In 2006, the GEOINT Symposium featured then Director of National Intelligence John D. Negroponte as keynote speaker. In 2008, the address was delivered by Negroponte's successor, Mike McConnell, whose speech was picked up by multiple media outlets.

== Sources ==
- Shorrock, Tim (2008). Spies for Hire: The Secret World of Intelligence Outsourcing. Simon and Schuster. ISBN 978-0743282246.
