= Peter Garvin =

U.S. Navy admiral

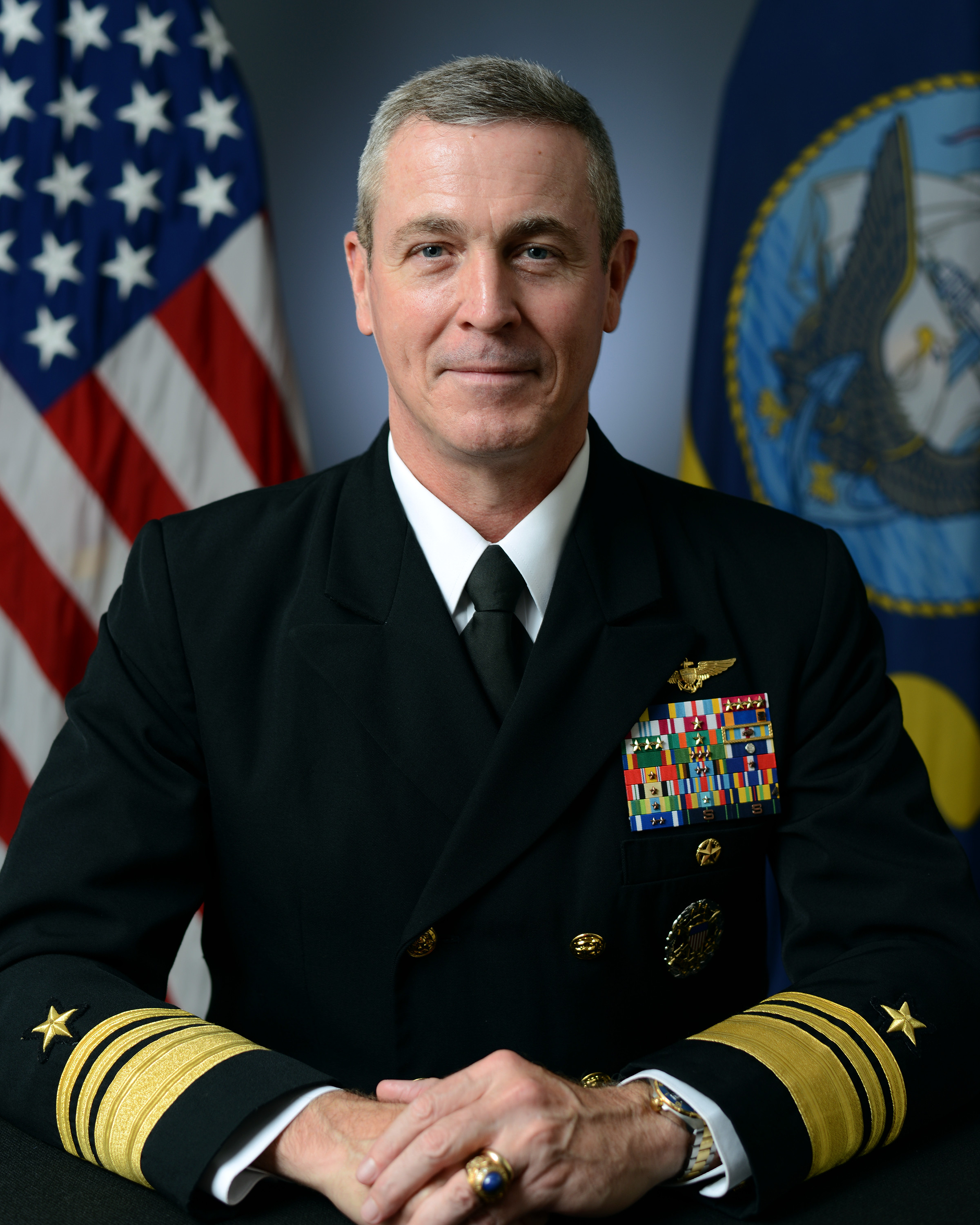
- Official portrait, 2024
- Born: c. 1967 (age 58–59)
- Military career
- Allegiance: United States
- Branch: United States Navy
- Service years: 1989–present
- Rank: Vice Admiral
- Commands: National Defense University; Naval War College; Naval Education and Training Command; Patrol and Reconnaissance Group; Navy Recruiting Command; Patrol and Reconnaissance Wing 10; VP-8
- Awards: Navy Distinguished Service Medal; Defense Superior Service Medal (2); Legion of Merit (4) Defense Meritorious Service Medal

Peter A. Garvin (born c. 1967) is a United States Navy vice admiral who has served as the 18th president of the National Defense University since 11 October 2024. He most recently served as the president of the Naval War College from 2023 to 2024.

== Education ==
Garvin graduated with a bachelor of science and aerospace engineering from the U.S. Naval Academy in 1989. He received his master of science in national security strategy in 2005 from the National War College. In 2015, he became an alumni from the Massachusetts Institute of Technology Seminar XXI.

== Career ==
In 1995 Garvin was on operational assignment with the “Pelicans” of Patrol Squadron (VP) 45, where he was awarded Association of Naval Aviation Pilot of the year. He was then the department head with the “Mad Foxes” of VP-5 onboard the USS Kearsarge (LHD3).Garvin then served as commanding officer of the “Fighting Tigers” of the VP-8 and the Patrol and Reconnaissance Wing (CPRW) 10. Garvin was the flag lieutenant to the Commander at the Patrol Wings Atlantic (CPWL), then Commander of the Task Force (CTF) 84.He then took on an instructor pilot position at the P-3 fleet replacement squadron, VP-30 before moving to the Bureau of Naval Personal (PERS-441) as Washington placement officer. After that he took on the role as executive officer for the director at the Operational Plans and Joint Force Development Directorate (J-7). Garvin then took on the role of Joint Staff federal executive fellow at the Council on Foreign Relations (CFR) before the undersea warfare branch head in the assessments division (N81) and deputy director, unmanned warfare systems (N99) on the Office of the Chief of Naval Operations staff. After which he was executive assistant to the vice chairman of the Joint Chiefs of Staff.From July 2020 until June 2023, he served as the commander of the Naval Education and Training Command, Patrol and Reconnaissance Group, and Navy Recruiting Command. In February 2023, it was announced that Garvin would take on the role of president of the Naval War College located in Newport, Rohde Island. While acting as president of the Naval War College, Garvin published the President’s Forum article. Garvin published an article in June 2024 entitled “Why You Shouldn’t Come to the Naval War College”. The article emphasized that the college is nothing close to a break from the responsibilities of being with a fleet and that students go through rigorous debate, analysis and academics there.

In July 2024, Garvin was nominated for promotion to vice admiral and assignment as president of the National Defense University. On 7 August 2025, Garvin was a guest on the podcast War on the Rocks episode Forging Minds for Future Wars.

Garvin returned to the NWC on 25 March 2026, to speak on the subject of warfighting in military education.

== Personal life ==
Peter A. Garvin is married to Cheryl and together they have two children, Kaylyn and Lauryn.

Military offices
Preceded by Jeffrey W. Hughes	Commander of the Navy Recruiting Command; 2017–2018	Succeeded by Brendan McLane
Preceded by William W. Wheeler	Commander of the Patrol and Reconnaissance Group; 2018–2020	Succeeded by Lance G. Scott
Preceded by Kyle J. Cozad	Commander of the Naval Education and Training Command; 2020–2023	Succeeded by Jeffrey J. Czerewko
Preceded by Shoshana Chatfield	President of the Naval War College; 2023–2024	Succeeded by Darryl L. Walker
Preceded by Michael T. Plehn	President of the National Defense University; 2024–present	Incumbent
