= Jeffrey Hughes =

United States Navy vice admiral

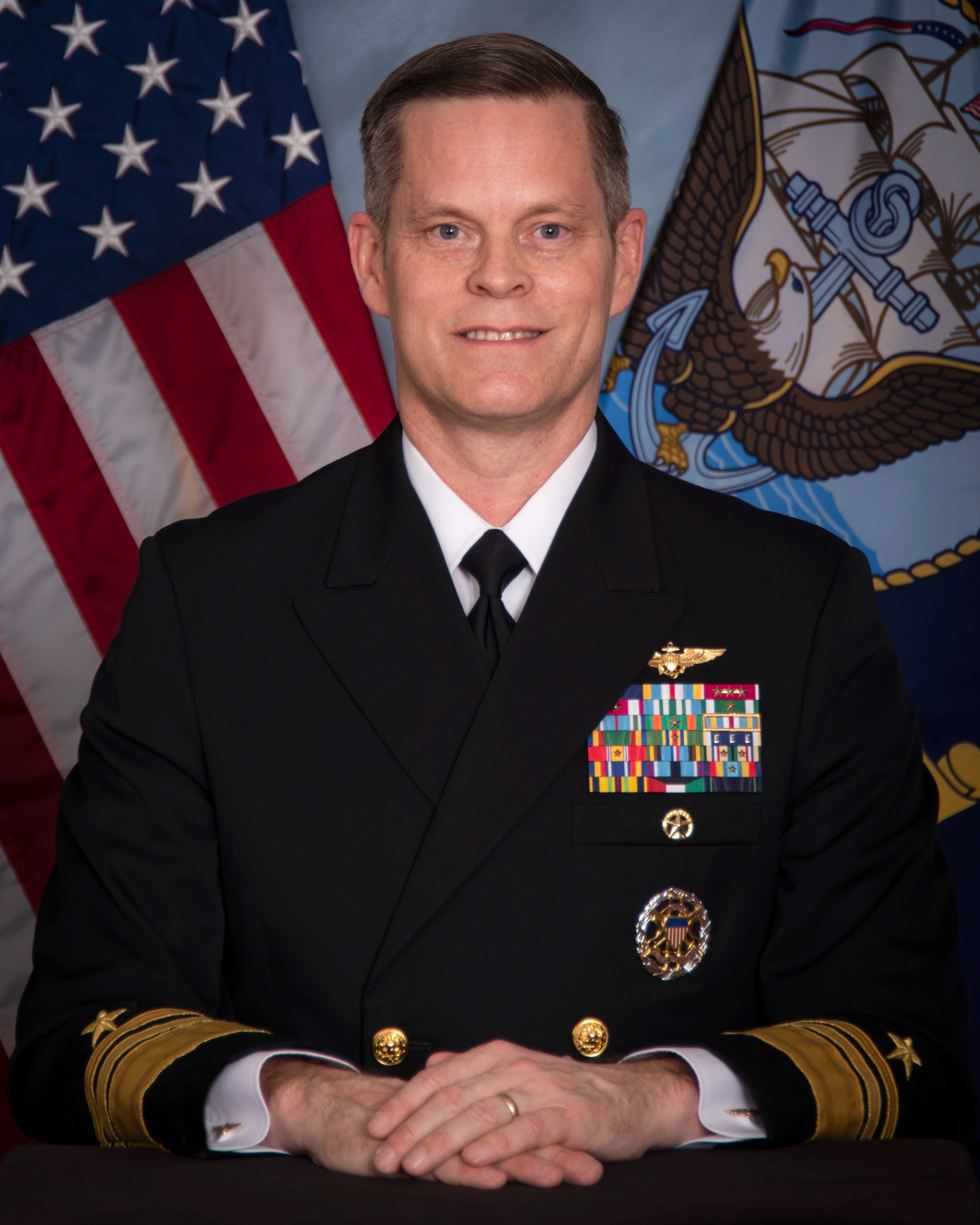
- Born: 1966 (age 59–60)
- Allegiance: United States
- Branch: United States Navy
- Service years: 1988–2026
- Rank: Vice Admiral
- Commands: Navy Personnel Command; Expeditionary Strike Group 2 Navy Recruiting Command; Helicopter Maritime Strike Wing Pacific; HSL-48
- Conflicts: Gulf War
- Awards: Navy Distinguished Service Medal; Defense Superior Service Medal; Legion of Merit (4)
- Alma mater: Duke University (BS); Naval War College (MA)

Jeffrey William Hughes (born 1966) is a retired United States Navy vice admiral who served as the Deputy Chief of Naval Operations for Warfighting Development of the United States Navy from 2021 to 2024.

== Early life and education ==
Hughes was raised in Pittsburgh, Pennsylvania. In 1988, he graduated with a Bachelor of Science in mechanical engineering from Duke University and then graduated with distinction with a Master of Arts in national security and strategic studies from the Naval War College in Newport, Rhode Island, with full Joint Professional Military Education credit.

== Naval career ==
In September 1989, Hughes was designated a naval aviator, flying MH-60R and SH-60B Seahawk helicopters. He served as squadron and detachment officer with the Swamp Foxes of Helicopter Anti-Submarine Squadron Light (HSL) 44 where he deployed on the USS Carr, the USS Elrod and the USS John Hancock in support of Strike Group deployments with the USS America and USS John F. Kennedy.

In 1993, Hughes was named HSL-44 (now HSM-74) Pilot of the Year and was the co-recipient of the Commanding Officer's Helmsman Award. He served as the flag lieutenant to commander for Carrier Group 4 on all six East Coast aircraft carriers. He then served as the executive officer and the 14th commanding officer of the Fighting Vipers of HSL-48 (now HSM-48). In 2007, he received the Helicopter Maritime Strike Wing, United States Atlantic Fleet Navy and Marine Association peer-selected leadership award. He also served as the commander, Helicopter Maritime Strike Wing, United States Pacific Fleet. In his first flag assignment, he served as the commander, Navy Recruiting Command. On 21 July 2017, he was appointed as commander of Expeditionary Strike Group 2.

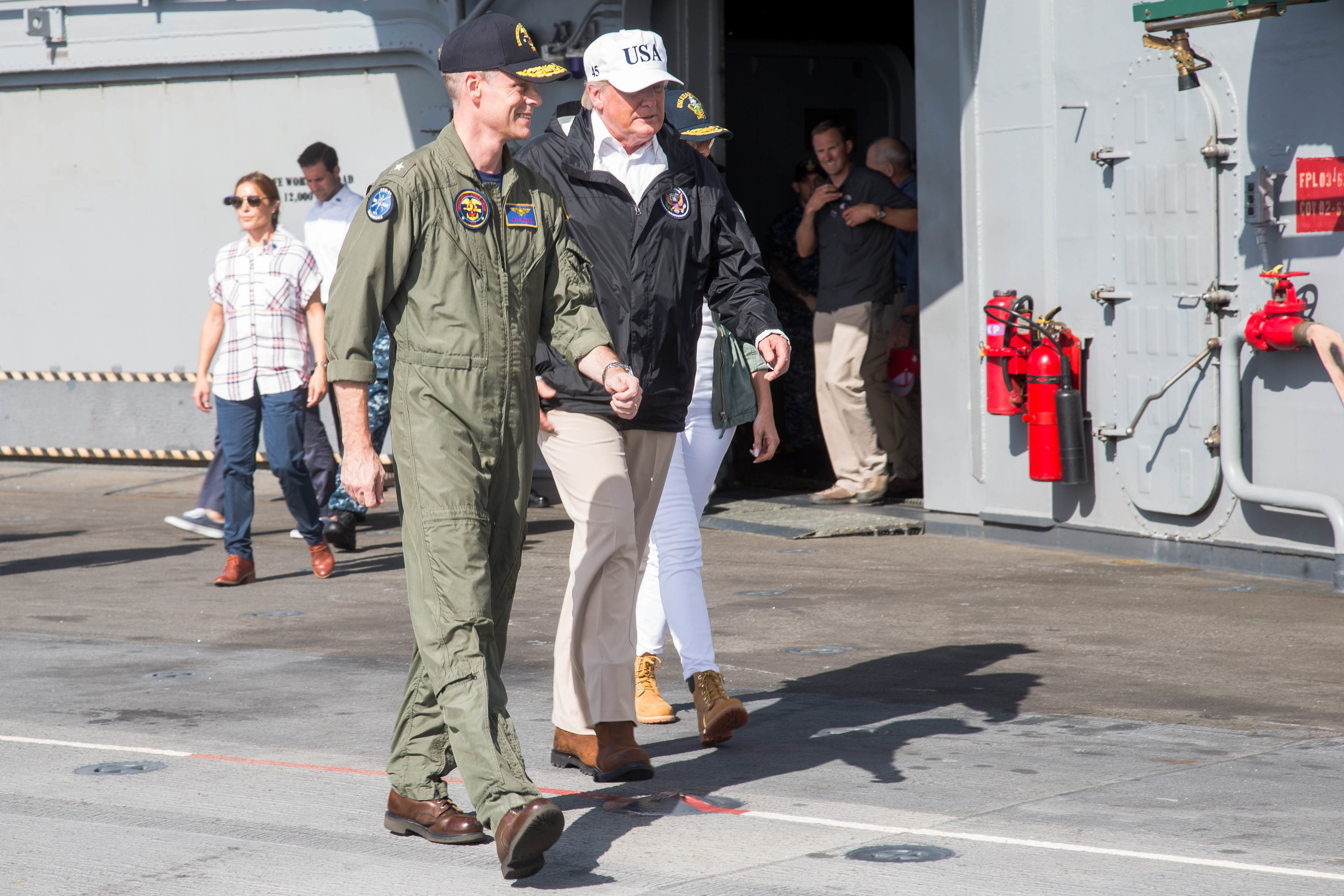
Jeff Hughes escorts President Donald Trump during his visit to USS Kearsarge on 2 October 2017

On 24 September 2017, Hughes' command, Expeditionary Strike Group Kearsarge which included the amphibious assault ship USS Kearsarge and the dock landing ship USS Oak Hill along with the 2,400 marines of 26th Marine Expeditionary Unit, deployed off the coast of Puerto Rico to coordinate naval relief efforts after Hurricane Maria. The ships had previously been prepositioned to the south of the island to assist in the recovery efforts once the hurricane had passed.

In March 2018, Hughes assumed command of Navy Personnel Command and became Deputy Chief of Naval Personnel. On 12 November 2020, he was nominated for promotion to vice admiral and assignment as Deputy Chief of Naval Operations for Warfighting Development. On 14 December 2020, his nomination was confirmed by voice vote of the full United States Senate. In May 2023, he was nominated for assignment as the deputy chief of staff for capability development of Allied Command Transformation.

Hughes' decorations include the Navy Distinguished Service Medal, Defense Superior Service Medal, the Legion of Merit (four awards), and the Meritorious Service Medal (two awards).

Military offices
Preceded by Annie B. Andrews	Commander of the United States Navy Recruiting Command; 2015–2017	Succeeded by Peter A. Garvin
Preceded by Roy Kitchener	Commander of the Expeditionary Strike Group 2; 2017–2018	Succeeded by John B. Skillman
Preceded by Richard A. Brown	Commander of the Navy Personnel Command; 2018–2020	Succeeded by Alvin Holsey
Preceded by Lisa Franchetti	Deputy Chief of Naval Operations for Warfighting Development of the United States Navy; 2021–2024	Succeeded by Daniel W. Dwyer
Preceded by David Julazadeh	Deputy Chief of Staff for Capability Development of the Allied Command Transformation; 2024–2026	Succeeded by Marcus B. Annibale
