= Naval Service Training Command =

Echelon III command of the U.S. Navy

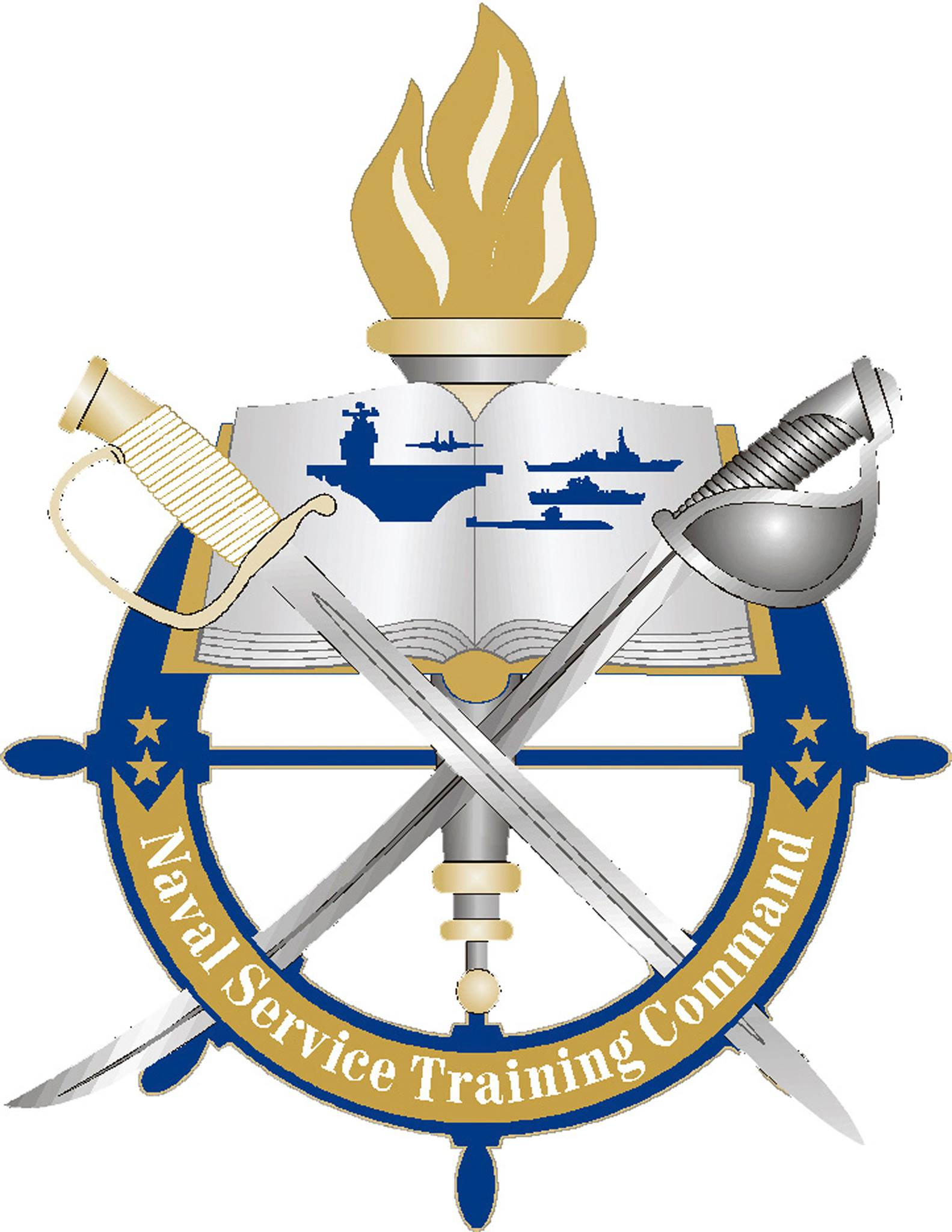
- Naval Service Training Command seal
- Active: 2003–present
- Country: United States
- Branch: United States Navy
- Type: Training Command
- Role: Train new recruits and enlisted to commissioned officers.
- Size: Echelon III
- Part of: Naval Education and Training Command
- HQ: Naval Station Great Lakes, Illinois
- Nickname: NSTC
- Website: https://www.netc.navy.mil/NSTC/

Commanders
- Commander: RDML Matt Pottenburgh; Commander, Naval Service Training Command

The Naval Service Training Command (NSTC) is a one-star echelon III command of the United States Navy that is responsible to the chief of naval education and training for the indoctrination and training of all new accessions into the Naval Service, with the exception of Midshipmen who access through the United States Naval Academy. This includes all new recruits through Recruit Training Command, the Navy's only enlisted recruit training location and all Officer "Candidates" who are seeking a commission through the Officer Training Command at Naval Station Newport, Rhode Island. Also under its purview is the operation of the various Naval Reserve Officers Training Corps (NROTC) units in universities across the country. The current NSTC is Rear Admiral Matthew T. Pottenburgh.

== Subordinate Commands ==
=== Recruit Training Command, Great Lakes ===
The Recruit Training Command Great Lakes (RTC Great Lakes), is a command unit within the NSTC primarily responsible for conducting the initial orientation and indoctrination of incoming recruits. It commonly is referred to as boot camp, recruit training, or RTC. Since the BRAC-directed closures of Recruit Training Commands in Orlando, Florida, and San Diego, California, in 1999, RTC Great Lakes has been the only enlisted basic training location in the U.S. Navy and has been called "The Quarterdeck of the Navy" since it was first utilized in July 1911.

Running at approximately eight weeks long, all enlistees into the U.S. Navy commence their enlistments at this command. Upon successful completion of basic training, qualifying sailors are sent to various apprenticeship, or "A schools", located across the United States for training in their occupational speciality, or ratings. Those who have not yet received a specific rating enter the fleet with a general designation of airman, fireman, or seaman. Recruit Training Command is located at Naval Station Great Lakes in the city of North Chicago, Illinois, in Lake County, north of Chicago. It is a tenant command, meaning that although it is located on the base, it has a separate chain of command.

=== Officer Training Command, Newport ===
The Officer Training Command Newport is the command unit of NSTC that is responsible to develop civilians, enlisted, and newly commissioned personnel for service in the fleet as Naval Officers. This is accomplished through many different programs from direct commissioning of civilians through Officer Candidate School, to converting enlisted personnel to commissioned officers through the STA-21 program.

=== Naval Reserve Officer Training Corps (NROTC) ===
The Naval Reserve Officer Training Corps commissions individuals into either the United States Navy as an Ensign or the United States Marine Corps as a Second Lieutenant. While attending college, these prospective officer candidates are known as Midshipmen. Whereas Naval Academy Midshipmen are on active duty, NROTC Midshipmen are in the Navy Reserve but are on active duty for periods of training during the summer. The primary difference is that NROTC Midshipmen attend an ordinary civilian college or university, whereas Naval Academy Midshipmen attend the U.S. Naval Academy in Annapolis, MD, which is a much more regimented, military environment.

Under the modern U.S. Naval ROTC system, graduates become active duty officers, rather than reserve officers, and are required to serve a term of 5 years for the Navy Option and 4 years for the Marine and Nurse Options.

==== Naval Junior Reserve Officer Training Corps (NJROTC) ====
Although not an accession program, the Navy JROTC program and curriculum is managed by the Naval Service Training Command. Contrary to popular belief, the program is not designed as an immediate preparation for military service, but instead "emphasizes citizenship and leadership development" as required under Federal law. However, students who remain in the program for 3 years are entitled to an automatic advancement to E-3 if they choose to enlist and complete basic training in the Army, Navy or Air Force, while completing 2 years of JROTC will entitle them to an automatic advancement to E-2 in the Army and Navy only. Marine Corps JROTC cadets can only earn an E-2 advancement, and only for completing 3 years.

The program director is Captain Brent Cower.
