= Naval Education and Training Command =

Enterprise-level shore command of the U.S. Navy

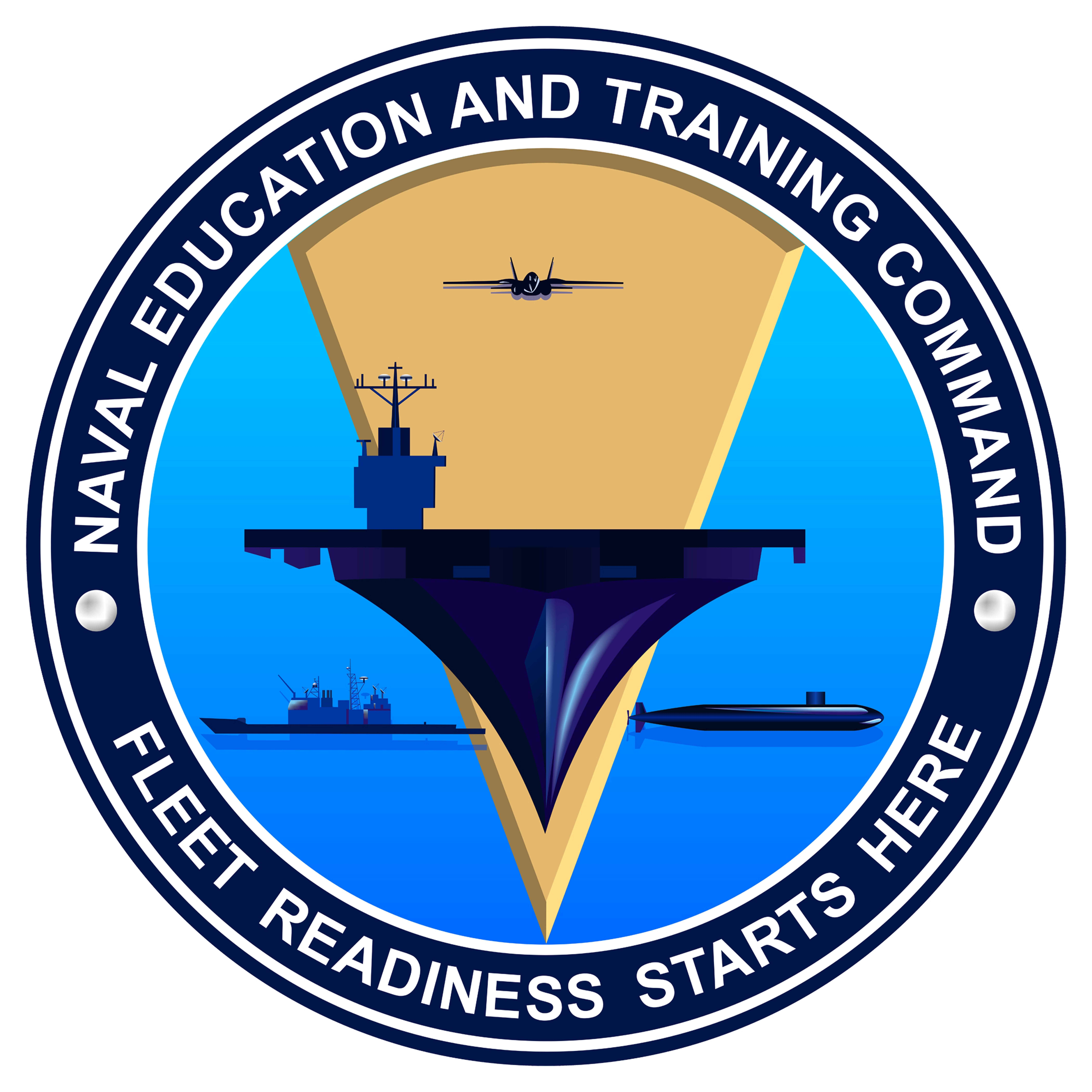
- Naval Education and Training Command seal
- Active: 21 July 1971 - present
- Country: United States
- Branch: United States Navy
- Type: Training Command
- Role: Training and education of naval forces
- Size: Enterprise-level
- Part of: Chief of Naval Operations
- HQ: Naval Air Station Pensacola, Florida
- Nickname: NETC
- Motto: Fleet Readiness Starts Here
- Website: www.netc.navy.mil

Commanders
- Commander: RADM Gregory C. Huffman
- Executive Director: Kent Miller
- Chief of Staff: Captain Gregory L. Tiner
- Force Master Chief: FORCM Ben Hodges

The Naval Education and Training Command (NETC) is an enterprise-level shore command of the United States Navy with more than 19,000 military and staff personnel at more than 1,640 subordinate activities, sites, districts, stations, and detachments throughout the world, and was established in 1971. NETC recruits, trains and delivers those who serve the nation, taking them from "street to fleet" by transforming civilians into highly skilled, operational, and combat ready warfighters. In 2018, accessions management and distribution functions of the Bureau of Naval Personnel (BUPERS) were realigned under NETC and Navy Recruiting Command (NAVCRUITCOM) now serves as a subordinate command to NETC.

The commander of Naval Education and Training Command is currently a 2-star admiral. NETC headquarters is located at Naval Air Station Pensacola, Florida.

== Naval Service Training Command ==
Naval Service Training Command, based in Naval Station Great Lakes, in Great Lakes, Illinois, is the one-star command that is responsible for the training of all new accessions into the United States Navy. He or she oversees the operation of Recruit Training Command, Great Lakes, Illinois, the Navy's only enlisted recruit training location, and is responsible for the operation of Officer Training Command at Naval Station Newport, Rhode Island, and the operation of the Naval Reserve Officers Training Corps (NROTC). The only accession route not commanded by NSTC is that of the United States Naval Academy, which is overseen by the superintendent of the United States Naval Academy, who reports directly to the chief of naval operations.

== NETC Learning Centers ==
After initial training, most personnel must continue on to an apprentice-level training before entering the fleet. For that, Navy NETC has "learning centers" that provide those initial and continuing training to the personnel across the service:

- Surface Combat Systems Training Command (formerly the Center for Surface Combat Systems), located at Naval Support Facility Dahlgren, is a training organization of over 6,500 staff and students across 13 global locations that include 5 SCSTC Schoolhouses, 2 SCSTC Training Facilities, and 6 SCSTC Waterfront Detachments, providing instruction to the USN Fleet Surface Combat Systems and Aegis Ballistic Missile Defense System operators and technicians. SCSTC is responsible for the career-learning continuums for Surface Warfare Officer (designators 1110, 6120, 6180), Electronics Technician (ET), Fire Controlman (FC), Fire Controlman (Aegis) (FCA), Interior Communications Electrician (IC), Gunner’s Mate (GM), Mineman (MN), Operations Specialist (OS), and Sonar Technician (Surface) (STG) training, as well as tailored Surface Combat or Ballistic Missile Defense System courses to support the U.S. Army, U.S. Marine Corps, U.S. Coast Guard, U.S. Air Force, U.S. Merchant Marine, and our International Partners.
- Center for Information Warfare Training leads, manages and delivers Navy and joint force training in Intelligence, information warfare, Cryptology and Information Technology.
- Center for Security Forces, headquartered at Joint Expeditionary Base Little Creek–Fort Story, is responsible for the promulgation of the Navy's Anti-terrorism, Expeditionary warfare and Survival, Evasion, Resistance and Escape (SERE) training, as well as the initial training of the Navy's Master-at-arms rate
- Center for Explosive Ordnance Disposal & Diving, headquartered at Naval Support Activity Panama City, in Panama City, Florida is responsible for the training and education of Navy EOD Technicians and Navy Divers
- Center for SEAL (Sea, Air, and Land) and SWCC (Special Warfare Combatant-craft Crewman), or CENSEALSWCC, is aligned with the Naval Special Warfare (NSW) enterprise to develop NSW’s flagship weapon system and capital resource – its People – to be the best Special Operations Forces leaders in the Department of Defense.
- Naval Submarine Learning Center, located at Naval Submarine Base New London, in Groton, Connecticut is responsible for the development of training for both enlisted and officer undersea (submarine) personnel.
- Center for Service Support at Naval Station Newport is responsible for the training and education of the Navy's logistics, administration and media related officers and enlisted personnel. https://www.netc.navy.mil/CSS/
- Center for Naval Aviation Technical Training, is headquartered at Naval Air Station Pensacola, and it trains and educates all enlisted aviation rated personnel, as well as Aviation Maintenance Officers.
- Center for Seabees and Facilities Engineering, headquartered at Naval Base Ventura County, in Port Hueneme, CA, is responsible for the training and development of enlisted constructionmen (commonly known as Seabees) and the Civil Engineer Corps.
- Surface Warfare Schools Command, also located at Naval Station Newport provides education and training to surface warfare officers and enlisted engineers ratings.
- Engineering Officer Duty School, also located at NBVC provides training and professional development for Engineering duty officers.
- Naval Chaplaincy School and Center, located at Naval Station Newport, Rhode Island, is responsible for the training of both United States Navy Chaplain Corps officers and enlisted Religious Program Specialists.
- Naval Aviation Schools Command (NAVAVSCOLSCOM or NASC), located at Naval Air Station Pensacola, Florida, provides an educational foundation in technical training, character development, and professional leadership to prepare Navy, Marine Corps, Coast Guard and partner nation officers and enlisted students to be combat quality aviation professionals, and deliver them at the right time, in the right numbers, to be the forces their nation needs.
- The Naval Leadership and Ethics Center (NLEC) is headquartered at Naval Station Newport, Rhode Island, with locations in Dam Neck, Virginia and San Diego, California. Each year, NLEC prepares the command triad (master chiefs/chiefs of the boat, executive officers, and commanding officers) for leadership success.

In addition, NETC operates Training Support Centers, that provide centralized student management and infrastructure support the individual learning centers and their subordinate sites, located in San Diego, Virginia Beach and Great Lakes, Illinois.

== NETC Professional Development Center (NETPDC) ==
Naval Education and Training Professional Development Center, which is located on Saufley Field in Escambia County, Florida, is the home of all of the Navy's enlisted professional development programs and products, which include the administering Voluntary Education (VOLED) programs, including the Navy College program, which allows enlisted servicemembers to obtain college credits for Naval Training, as well as administering the Tuition Assistance program that pays for 100% of a servicemembers college courses expense while the member is active duty.

In addition, NETPDC administers, develops and delivers the Navy-wide Advancement examination, and processes individuals for advancement, in conjunction with the Bureau of Naval Personnel.

== Commander of Naval Education and Training Command ==
United States Navy Commander of Naval Education and Training Command
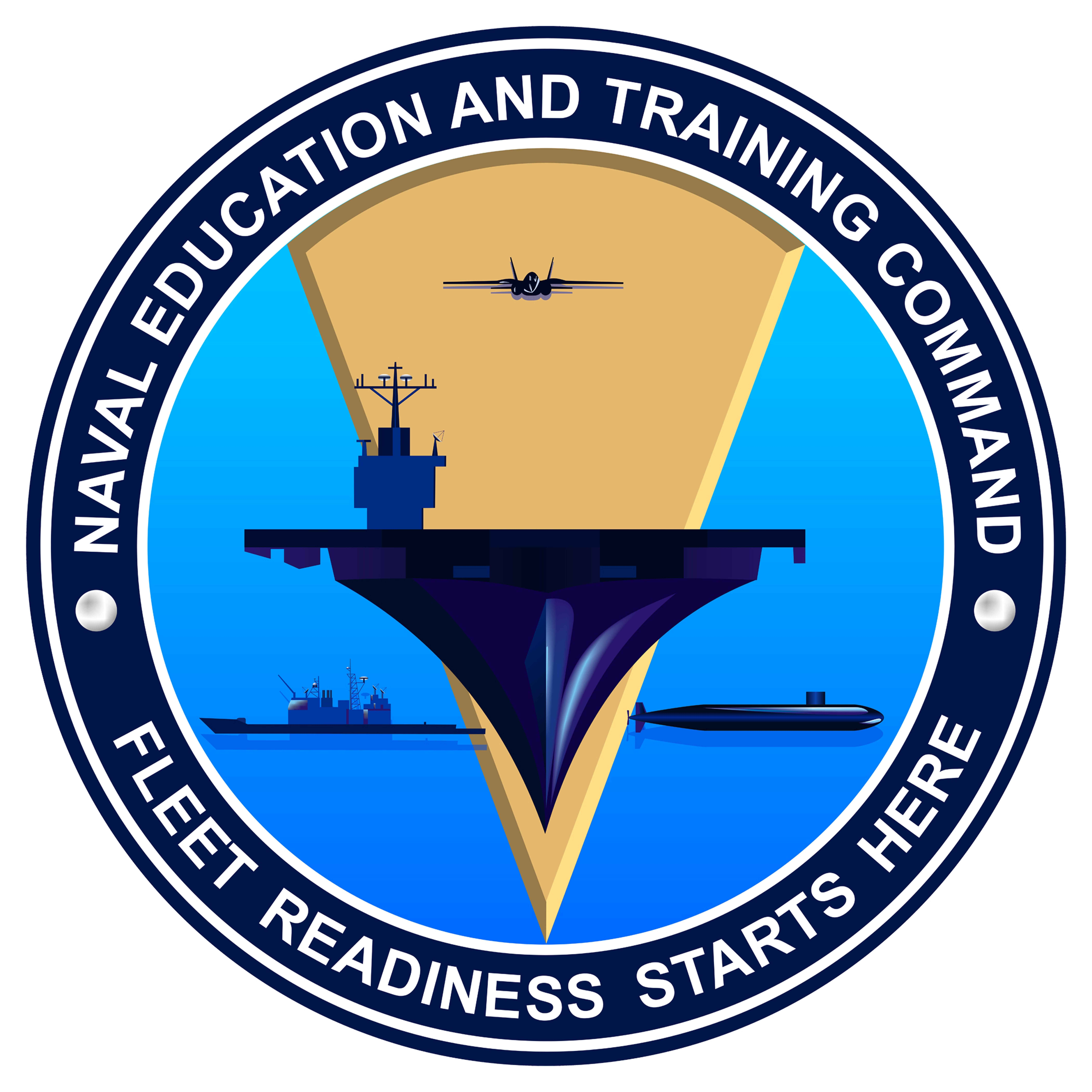

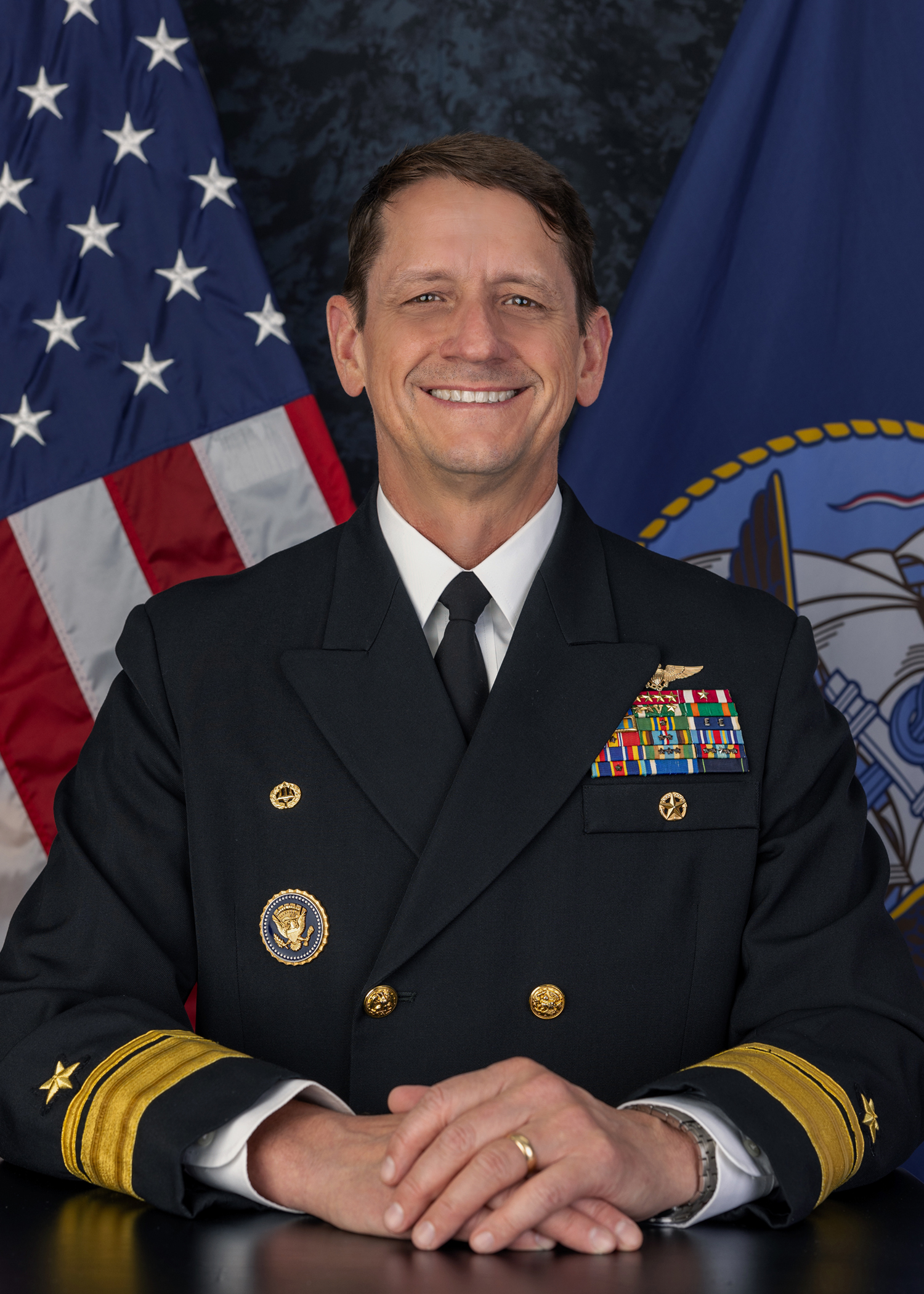
- Incumbent; RADM Gregory C. Huffman since June 18, 2025
- Reports to: Chief of Naval Personnel Chief of Naval Operations
- Constituting instrument: OPNAVINST.5450.336 (series)
- Website: Official Website

The commander of naval education and training is the individual responsible to the chief of naval operations for the training and education of all enlisted and commissioned personnel of the United States Navy, and oversees the Naval Education and Training Command.

While not a member of the OPNAV staff, he is responsible to the deputy chief of naval operations (personnel, manpower, and training) for the operation and management of the Navy Advancement Center, which uses bi-annual testing to advance enlisted members, and is "the principal advisor to the Chief of Naval Operations (CNO) and Commander, U.S. Fleet Forces Command (COMUSFLTFORCOM) on training and education related matters."

=== List of Commanders of Naval Education and Training and Commanders of Naval Education and Training Command ===
	Period	Name	Date of Command
1.	1971–1974	VADM Malcom W. Cagle	July 1971
2.	1974–1978	VADM James B. Wilson	September 1974
3.	1978–1980	RADM Paul C. Gibbons, Jr.	November 1978
4.	1980–1983	RADM Kenneth L. Shugart	June 1980
5.	1983–1985	VADM James A Sagerholm	January 1983
6.	1985–1988	VADM Nils R. Thunman	November 1985
7.	1988–1991	RADM John S. Disher	October 1988
8.	1991–1992	VADM John H. Fetterman, Jr.	January 1991
9.	1992–1994	VADM Robert K. U. Kihune	August 1992
10.	1994–1996	VADM Timothy W. Wright	August 1994
11.	1996–1997	VADM Patricia A. Tracey	June 1996
12.	1997–2001	VADM John W. Craine, Jr.	December 1998
13.	2001–2004	VADM Alfred G. Harms, Jr.	May 2001
14.	2004–2007	VADM James K. Moran	November 2004
15.	2007–2009	RADM Gary R. Jones	January 2007
16.	2009–2012	RADM Joseph F. Kilkenny	August 2009
17.	2012–2014	RADM Donald P. Quinn	January 2012
18.	2014–2017	RADM Michael S. White	January 2014
19.	2017-2020	RADM Kyle J. Cozad	July 2017
20.	2020–2023	RADM Peter A. Garvin	July 2020
21.	2023–2025	RADM Jeffrey J. Czerewko	June 2023
22.	2025–present	RADM Gregory C. Huffman	June 2025

== See also ==
U.S. Armed Forces training and education commands

- Army Training and Doctrine Command
- Marine Corps Training and Education Command
- Air Education and Training Command
- Space Training and Readiness Command
