= Gregory C. Huffman =

U.S. Navy admiral

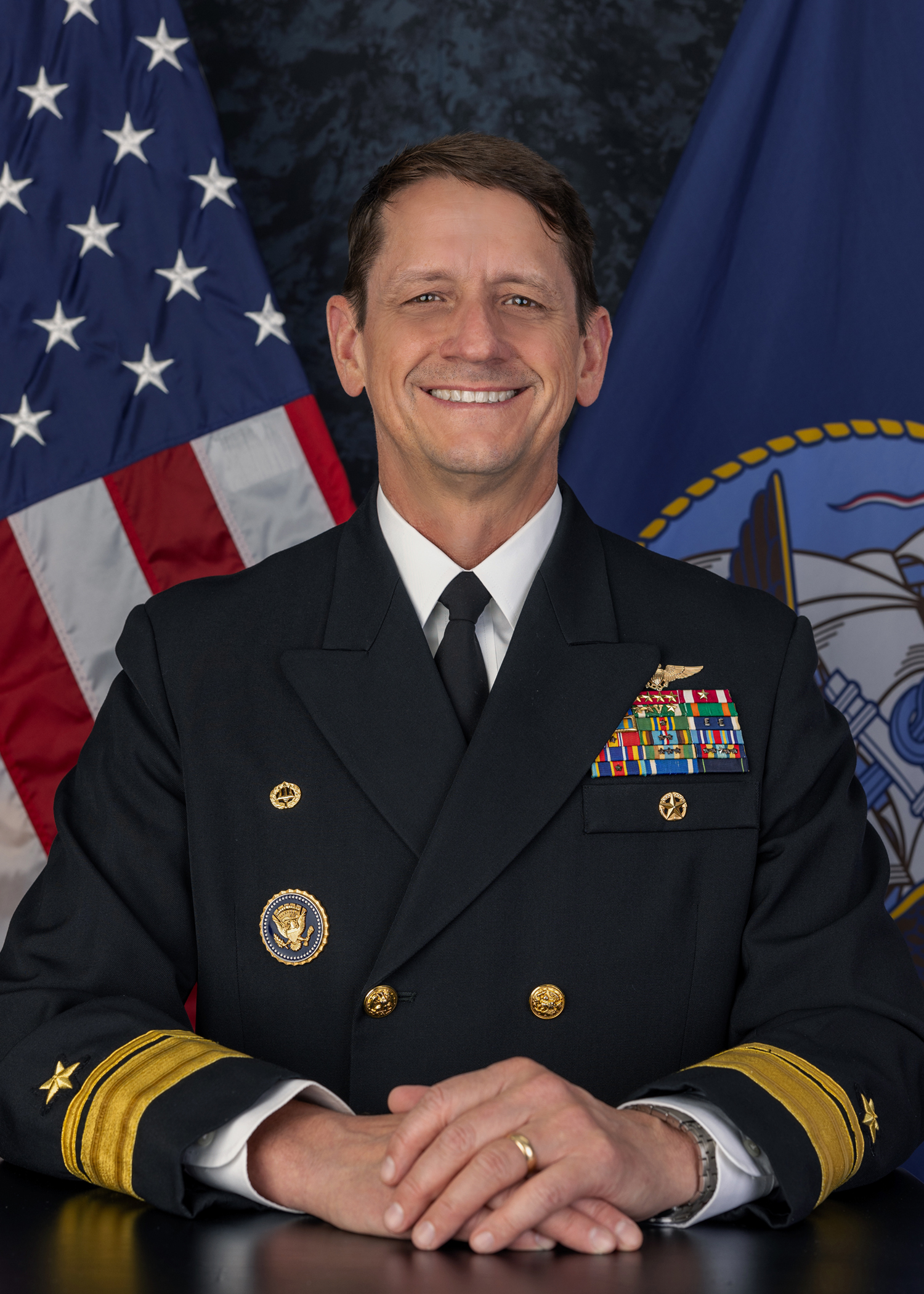
- Born: 1967 (age 58–59)
- Education: United States Naval Academy (BA); University of Maryland (MA); University of Tennessee (MS)
- Military career
- Allegiance: United States
- Branch: United States Navy
- Service years: 1989–present
- Rank: Rear Admiral
- Commands: Naval Education and Training Command; Joint Region Marianas; Carrier Strike Group 12; USS John C. Stennis (CVN-74); USS Green Bay (LPD-20); VFA-27
- Conflicts: Bosnian War; Kosovo War; Iraq War; War in Afghanistan
- Awards: Defense Superior Service Medal; Legion of Merit (5)

Gregory Clark Huffman (born 1967) is a United States Navy rear admiral who has served as the commander of Naval Education and Training Command since June 18, 2025. He most recently served as the commander of Joint Task Force – Micronesia from 2024 to 2025. He served as the commander of Joint Region Marianas from 2023 to 2024. He served as commander of Carrier Strike Group 12 from 2021 to 2023. Prior to that, he served as director of operations and plans of the Operations, Plans and Strategy Directorate (N3), with command tours including the USS John C. Stennis and USS Green Bay. He graduated from the United States Naval Academy in 1989. Huffman became a rear admiral with Senate confirmation in 2019.

Huffman earned an M.A. degree in history from the University of Maryland in 1989 and an M.S. degree in aviation systems from the University of Tennessee in 2000.

Military offices
Preceded by Putnam H. Browne	Commanding Officer of USS Green Bay (LPD-20); 2013–2014	Succeeded by Kristy D. McCallum
Preceded by Michael A. Wettlaufer	Commanding Officer of USS John C. Stennis (CVN-74); 2016–2018	Succeeded by Randall W. Peck
Preceded by Craig Clapperton	Commander of Carrier Strike Group 12; 2021–2023	Succeeded by Erik J. Eslich
Preceded by Benjamin R. Nicholson	Commander of Joint Region Marianas; 2023–2024	Succeeded by M. Brent DeVore
New command	Commander of Joint Task Force-Micronesia; 2024–2025	Succeeded by Joshua Lasky
Preceded by Jeffrey J. Czerewko	Commander of Naval Education and Training Command; 2025–present	Incumbent
