= Admiral Andrews =

Admiral Andrews may refer to:

- Adolphus Andrews (1879–1948), U.S. Navy vice admiral
- Annie B. Andrews (born 1959), U.S. Navy rear admiral
- Philip Andrews (admiral) (1866–1935), U.S. Navy vice admiral

== See also ==
- William Andrewes (1899–1974), British Royal Navy admiral
