= Center for Security Forces =

One of eleven learning centers of U.S. Naval Education and Training Command

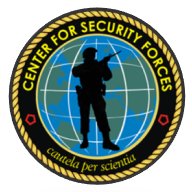
- Active: November 2001 - present
- Country: United States
- Branch: United States Navy
- Type: NETC Learning Center
- Role: Training and education of naval forces
- Size: Students: 28,000 (annually)
- Part of: Navy Installations Command
- HQ: Joint Expeditionary Base–Little Creek, Virginia Beach, Virginia
- Motto: Where Training Breeds Confidence
- Website: www.netc.navy.mil/centers/csf

Commanders
- Commanding Officer: CAPT Stephen S. Erb
- Executive Director: Mr. Larry McFarland, SES
- Command Master Chief: CMDCM (SW) Brian J. Dunn

The Navy's Center for Security Forces (CENSECFOR) is one of eleven learning centers of the United States Navy's Naval Education and Training Command that is headquartered on Joint Expeditionary Base–Little Creek, in Virginia Beach, Virginia. Through fourteen learning activities CENSECFOR is responsible for the training and education of personnel in antiterrorism and force protection (ATFP), expeditionary warfare, and in survival, evasion resistance and escape techniques. CENSECFOR is also the training command for all enlisted Master-at-Arms, whose "A" school is co-located at Joint Base San Antonio - Lackland.

== History ==
In the wake of Sept. 11, 2001, the Navy put plans in motion to increase the Fleet's ATFP posture worldwide. To lead this vital undertaking, the Navy established a new command two months later under U.S. Fleet Forces Command. Over the next two years, the “Antiterrorism Force Protection Warfare Development Center” (ATFPWDC) took shape and led efforts that formed the baseline for the more advanced training of today.

During that same time, the Navy was also undergoing a major shift in its philosophy and management of individual skills training dubbed “The Revolution in Training.” A vision introduced and directed by then Chief of Naval Operations Adm. Vern Clark. The result was a restructuring of the naval education and training architecture. This dramatic change allowed Navy trainers to work more closely with the Fleet at defining and validating the training needs of its Sailors. In turn, trainers can now develop and deliver more precise or targeted training that instructs Sailors in the vital skills needed to perform their duties and achieve mission success.

The keystone for this new approach in naval training was the creation of mission and warfare focused Learning Centers that would replace the traditional Fleet Training Center construct. The Center for Security Forces was officially established in July 2004 and assumed the mission, functions and tasking of the ATFPWDC.

Today, the Center for Security Forces is one of thirteen learning centers within the Naval Education and Training Command (NETC). The Center trains more than 28,000 students per year and has fourteen training location across the U.S. and around the world.

== Structure ==
CENSECFOR operates fourteen learning sites, with the largest being its Lackland training command. Out of the fourteen, NTTC Lackland is the only one that has its own separate command triad (CO/XO/CMC). All the remaining learning sites are detachments

- Naval Technical Training Center Lackland
- CENSECFOR Learning Site Little Creek
  - CENSECFOR Detachment Chesapeake
  - CENSECFOR Detachment Kittery
  - CENSECFOR Learning Site Mayport
  - CENSECFOR Learning Site Gulfport
  - CENSECFOR Learning Site Camp Lejeune
- CENSECFOR Learning Site Bangor
  - CENSECFOR Detachment San Diego
  - CENSECFOR Detachment North Island
  - CENSECFOR Detachment Hawaii
- CENSECFOR Learning Site Yokosuka

== Naval Technical Training Center Lackland ==
Naval Technical Training Center Lackland
- Country: United States
- Branch: United States Navy
- Type: NETC Learning Site
- Part of: Center for Security Forces
- HQ: Lackland Air Force Base, Joint Base San Antonio, Bexar County, Texas
- Website: www.netc.navy.mil/centers/csf/nttc-lackland/

Commanders
- Commanding Officer: CDR Christopher Breckenridge
- Executive Officer: CDR Alan Vaught
- Command Master Chief: CMDCM (SW/AW)

Naval Technical Training Center Lackland is a sub-unit of CENSECFOR that is located on Joint Base San Antonio - Lackland. While completely separate, it is co-located with the Air Force Security Forces Center. Three courses are taught at NTTC: the initial training for all enlisted Navy Master-at-arms as well a joint service Naval Corrections Specialists and a Navy Military Working Dog handlers and kennel-masters.

=== Law Enforcement/Master at Arms (LE/MA) School ===
All newly enlisted MAs receive formal and specialized training managed by the staff and personnel assigned to NTTC. Sailors graduating from "A" School will have the basic knowledge in performing law enforcement duties and will be qualified to operate the M9 pistol, M4/M16 rifle, M240B machine gun, M500 shotgun, expandable baton, Oleoresin Capsicum pepper spray, various restraining devices, and operating a patrol vehicle. MAs graduating from "A" School will also possess basic knowledge in interview and interrogation techniques, report writing, use of force and rules of engagement doctrine and mechanical advantage control hold, which are subject control techniques (Controlled FORCE Level I), and military law.
