= Center for Surface Combat Systems =

One of eleven learning centers of U.S. Naval Education and Training Command

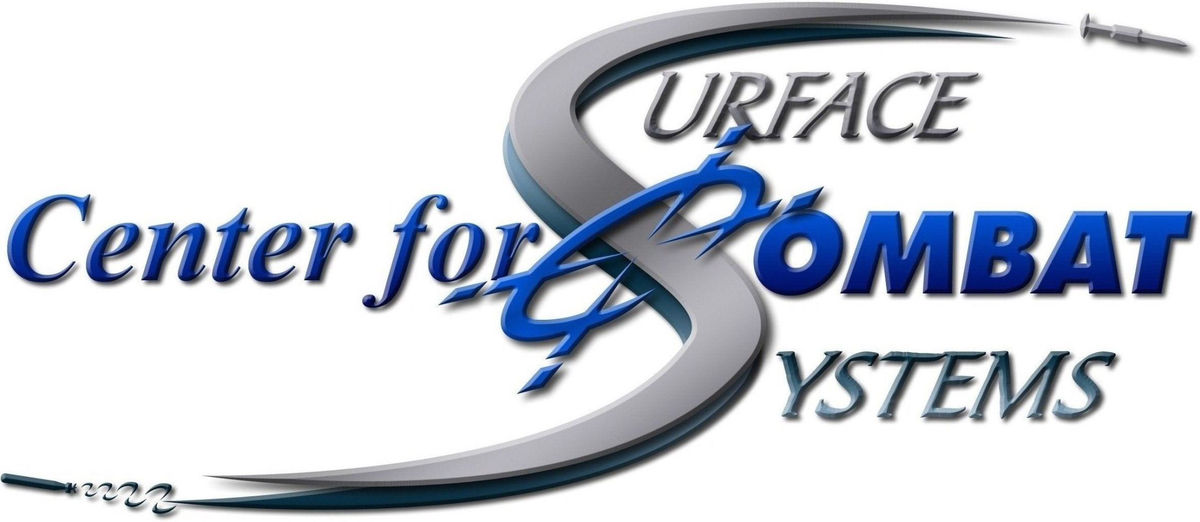
- Center for Surface Combat Systems logo
- Active: Active
- Country: United States
- Branch: United States Navy
- Type: NETC Learning Center
- Role: Training and education of naval forces
- Part of: Navy Installations Command
- HQ: Naval Support Facility Dahlgren Dahlgren, Virginia
- Mottos: 'Developing the right workforce through education and training'

Commanders
- Commanding Officer: CAPT Dave Stoner
- Executive Officer: CDR Michelle Page
- Command Master Chief: CMDCM (SW/IW) Thormod Forseth

The Center for Surface Combat Systems (CSCS) is one of eleven learning centers of Naval Education and Training Command, headquartered on Naval Support Facility Dahlgren operated learning centers for the education and training of United States Navy personnel on the operation and use of shipboard combat systems, including the Aegis Combat System, SSDS, tactical data links and other systems that can be used in the ship's combat information center (CIC). Through 70,000 hours' worth of curriculum in 700 courses, CSCS provides the fleet with highly trained surface warfare officers and enlisted personnel in the ratings of fire controlmen, electronic technicians, interior communications electricians, sonar technicians (surface), gunner's mates, minemen, operations specialists, and boatswain's mates.

== Learning Sites ==
CSCS operates 14 learning sites across the United States, mostly in large Fleet concentration areas:

- CSCS Detachment East, Norfolk
- CSCS Detachment Norfolk
- CSCS Detachment Wallops
- CSCS Unit Dam Neck
- CSCS Detachment West, San Diego
- CSCS Detachment Yokosuka
- CSCS Detachment Pearl Harbor Hawaii
- CSCS Detachment San Diego
- CSCS Detachment Pacific Northwest
- CSCS Unit Great Lakes
- AEGIS Training and Readiness Center (ATRC), Dahlgren
- ATRC Detachment Mayport
- Fleet Antisubmarine Training Center San Diego
- Mine Warfare Learning Center San Diego

== International Sites ==
Instructors from CSCS also train allied foreign military personnel using the Aegis Combat System on their ships, including the ROK Navy at the Aegis Operation and Maintenance Training Center, the Japan Maritime Self-Defense Force's Missile System Training Command, the Royal Norwegian Navy, at the Frigate Training Center, the Spanish Navy at the Antonio Escaño Specialist School, and with the Royal Australian Navy at HMAS Watson.

In addition, CSCS personnel are also overseas assisting and training the personnel who will be a part of the Aegis Ashore Missile Defense Program at Naval Support Facility Deveselu, Romania.
