= Robert K. U. Kihune =

United States Navy admiral

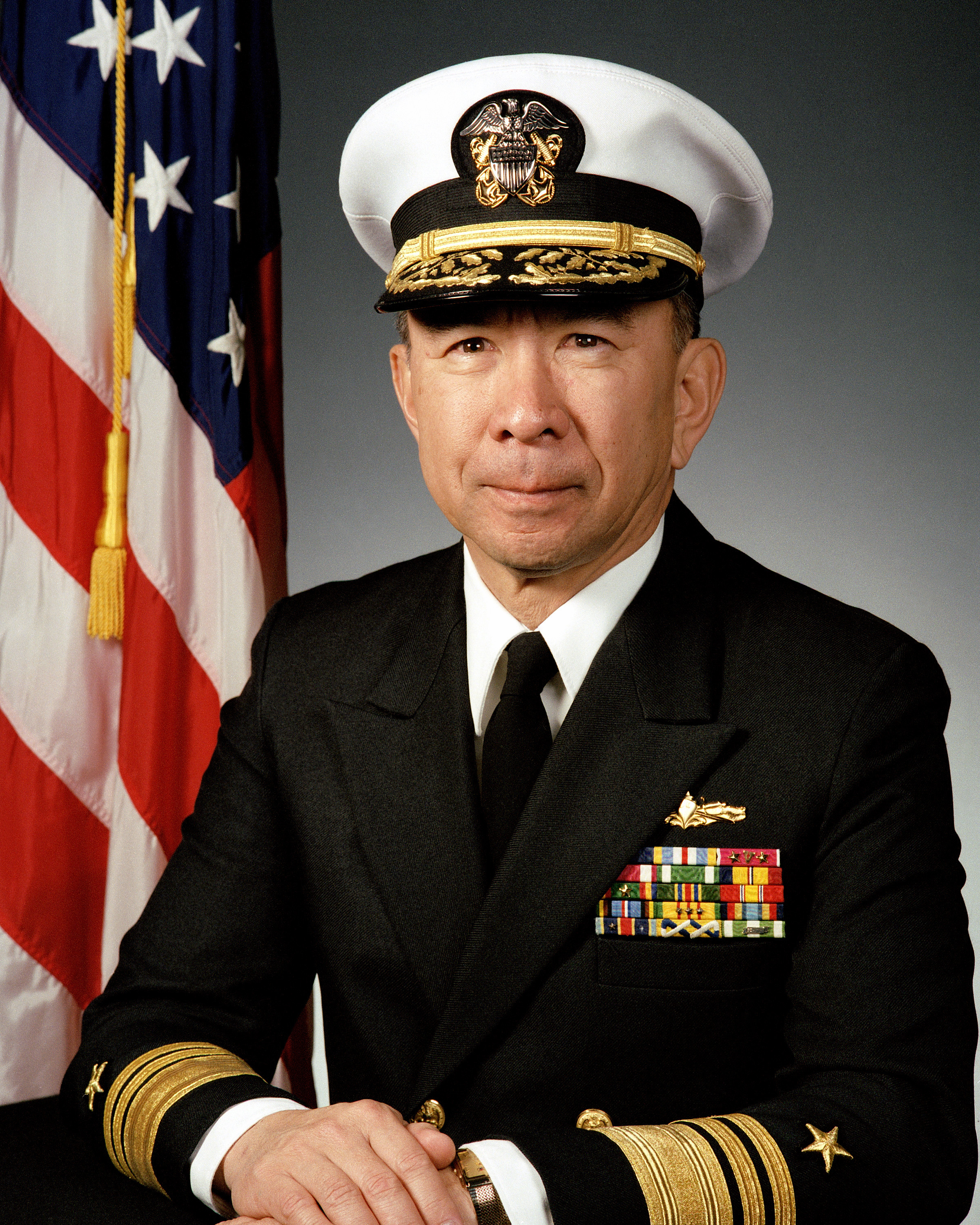
- Born: 15 June 1937 (age 88); Lahaina, Hawaii, U.S.
- Allegiance: United States of America
- Branch: United States Navy
- Service years: 1959–1994
- Rank: Vice Admiral
- Commands: Naval Education and Training Command; Naval Surface Force Pacific; Cruiser Destroyer Group 5; Destroyer Squadron 35; USS Cochrane (DDG-21)
- Conflicts: Vietnam War
- Awards: Navy Distinguished Service Medal; Defense Superior Service Medal; Legion of Merit with two gold stars and Combat "V"; Meritorious Service Medal
- Alma mater: United States Naval Academy (BS); Naval Postgraduate School (BS); Naval War College
- Spouse: Hope P. Zablan (m. 1961)

Robert Kalani Uichi Kihune (born 15 June 1937) is a retired United States Navy vice admiral. He served as commanding officer of the Naval Education and Training Command from 1992 to 1994. Kihune earlier served as commander, Naval Surface Force Pacific from 1988 to 1990. He was the Navy's first native Hawaiian vice admiral.

== Early life and education ==
Born in Lāhainā, Maui and raised in Kāneʻohe, Oʻahu, Kihune is a 1955 graduate of Kamehameha Schools Kapālama High School. Appointed to the United States Naval Academy, he graduated in June 1959 with a B.S. degree in marine engineering. Kihune later earned a second B.S. degree in communications engineering from the Naval Postgraduate School in May 1965. He attended the Naval War College in August 1977.

== Military career ==
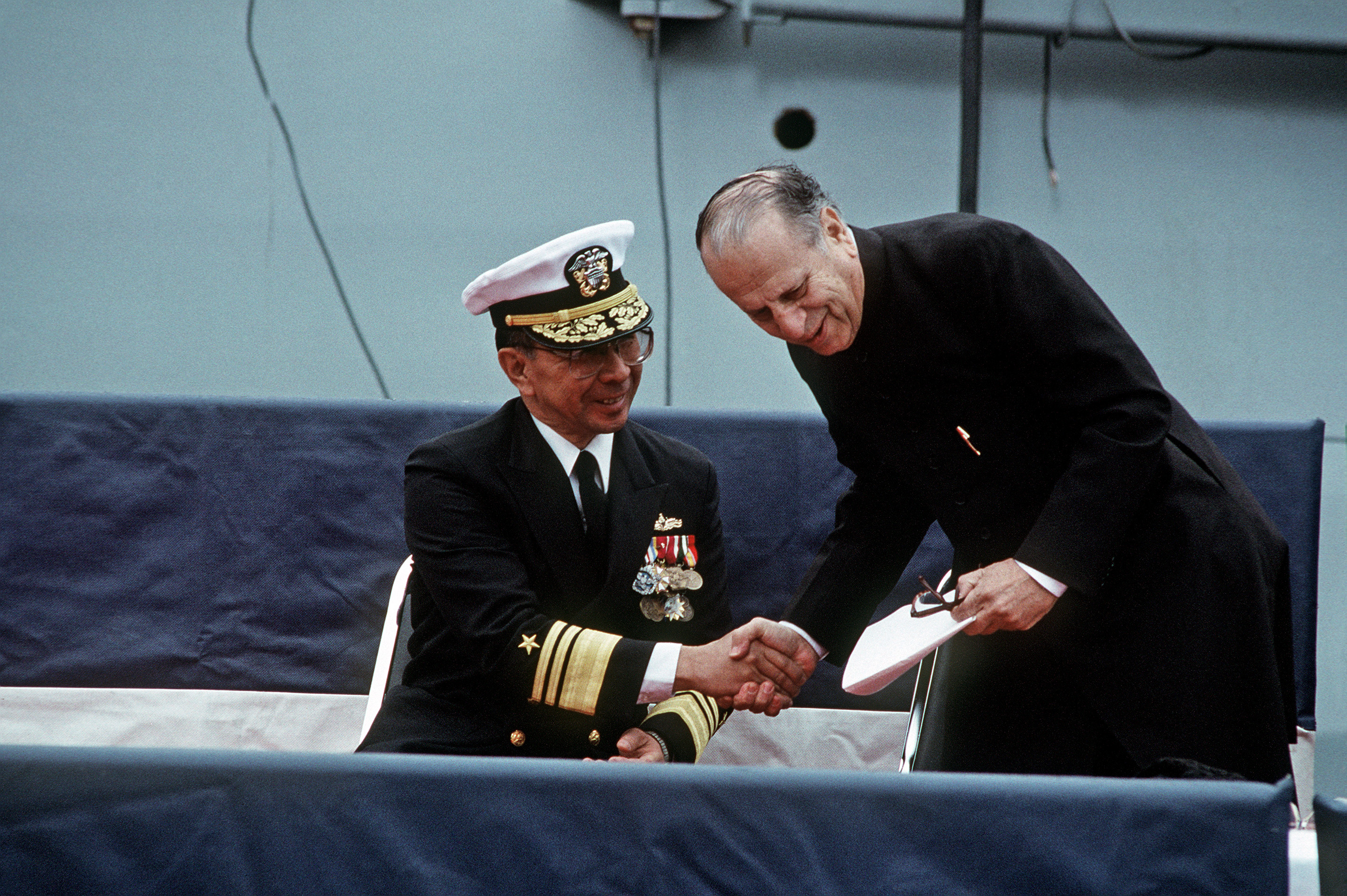
Kihune with Jamshaid A. Marker, Pakistani Ambassador to the United States on 8 February 1989.

A career surface warfare officer, Kihune commanded the guided missile destroyer USS Cochrane. Deployed to Southeast Asia, he conducted nightly attacks on North Vietnam while successfully avoiding any damage from enemy fire. Promoted to captain, he assumed command of Destroyer Squadron 35 in July 1980 and then became chief of staff to the commander, Naval Surface Force Pacific in August 1982.

As a commodore, Kihune served as director of Command, Control and Communication Systems for the United States European Command in Stuttgart, West Germany. In this position, Kihune provided support during the capture of terrorists of the Achille Lauro hijacking. Promoted to rear admiral, he was given command of Cruiser Destroyer Group 5 in September 1986.

On August 27, 1988, Kihune assumed command of the Naval Surface Force, U.S. Pacific Fleet. In January 1991, he became Assistant Chief of Naval Operations for Surface Warfare. In August 1992, Kihune became director of Naval Training and Doctrine and chief of Naval Education and Training. In 1993, while serving in this capacity, Kihune was involved in a congressional dispute regarding the Navy's Undergraduate Helicopter Pilot Training (UHPT) program, where he was accused of leaking the Navy's position of retaining the program by lawmakers to delay its consolidation with the Army's equivalent, defying the wishes of Secretary of Defense Les Aspin.

== Post-retirement ==
In 1999, Kihune was appointed chair of the board of trustees of the Hawaiian private school system Kamehameha Schools, where he was praised for his participatory style of leadership. He also serves as a member of several non-profit boards, including the USS Missouri Memorial Foundation since 1998. Kihune was appointed as vice president and member of the board of directors of Hawaiian telecommunications firm Sandwich Isles Communications in the 2000s, and became CEO in 2012 after his predecessor, Albert Hee (brother of state senator Clayton Hee), was indicted for tax fraud. As CEO, Kihune gave testimony in support of HB2325, a state bill intended to expand Hawaii's broadband infrastructure.

== Personal life ==
Kihune married Hope Puanani Zablan. They have three children.

== Awards and decorations ==

Surface Warfare Officer Pin
Navy Distinguished Service Medal
Defense Superior Service Medal	Legion of Merit with two award stars and Combat "V"	Meritorious Service Medal
Navy and Marine Corps Commendation Medal	Navy Combat Action Ribbon	Navy Unit Commendation with award star
Navy Meritorious Unit Commendation	National Defense Service Medal	Armed Forces Expeditionary Medal
Vietnam Service Medal with three bronze service stars	Navy Sea Service Deployment Ribbon	Navy and Marine Corps Overseas Service Ribbon with bronze service star
RVN Navy Distinguished Service Order	RVN Campaign Medal with 1960- device	Navy Pistol Marksmanship Ribbon
