= Officer Training Command Newport =

U.S. Navy command unit for officer training

Officer Training Command
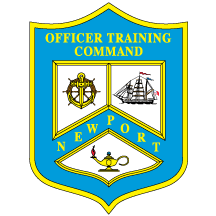
- Officer Training Command logo
- Active: present
- Country: United States
- Branch: United States Navy
- Type: Training Command
- Part of: Naval Education and Training Command
- HQ: Naval Station Newport, Rhode Island
- Website: https://www.netc.navy.mil/NSTC/OTCN/

Commanders
- Commanding Officer: CAPT Austin Duff; CO, Officer Training Command
- Executive Officer: CDR Nicole M. Scherer

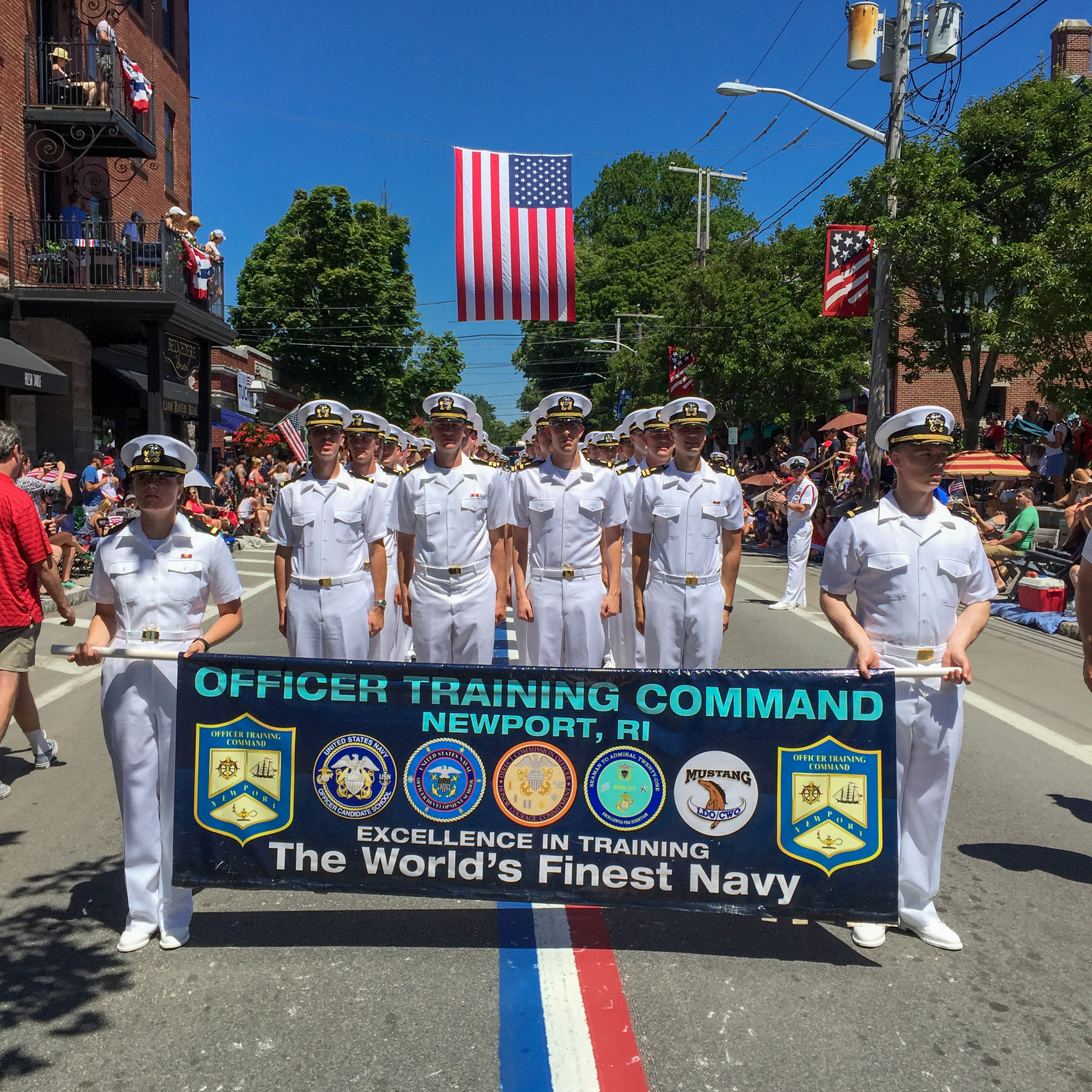
Newport Officer Training Command candidates march in Bristol.Bristol Fourth of July Parade

The Naval Officer Training Command Newport (or more simply, OTCN) is a command unit of Naval Education and Training Command, located on Naval Station Newport in Newport, Rhode Island that is responsible to the Chief of Naval Education and Training for the development of civilians, enlisted, and newly commissioned personnel for service in the fleet as Naval Officers. Outside of the requisite physical readiness testing, the programs are academic in nature, and with the exception of the students enrolled in the Naval Science Institute or Officer Candidate School, personnel will come to Officer Training School having already received their commission or warrant.

== Enlisted conversion and initial training ==
Enlisted personnel who apply, and are selected to directly convert to a commissioned officer will attend one of the first two classes (depending on their duty status) and will then take the followup LDO/CWO Academy. OCS graduates who are staff officers will also attend ODS.

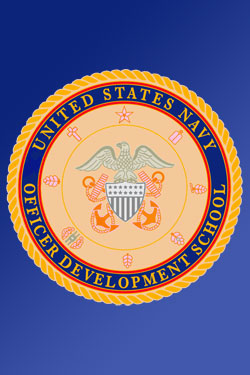
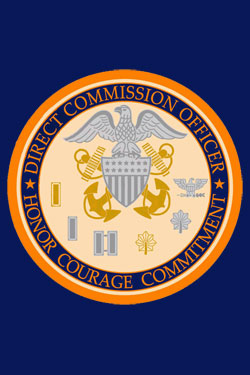
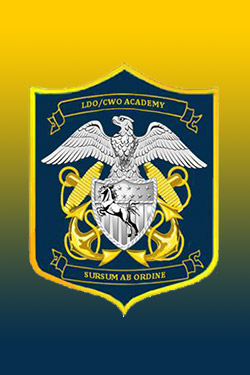
Logo of the Officer Development School	=== Officer Development School (ODS) === Officer Development School is the initial training for all individuals who were directly commissioned as a Limited Duty or Warrant officer from an enlisted paygrade and for all Staff corps officers (There are also Civil Engineering Corps (CEC) and Supply Corps candidates that go through OCS). The course is both comprehensive and intense, and is designed to facilitate the introduction of the newly commissioned Ensigns to their new responsibilities as a naval officer. Training lasts five weeks long, and consists of academic courses such as Naval leadership and administration, military law, and naval warfare, along with physical readiness testing.
Logo of the Officer Development School	=== Direct Commission Officer Indoctrination School (DCOIC) === DCOIC was disestablished in OCT 2019. Reservists will now attend ODS or the LDO/CWO Academy. Direct Commission Officer Indoctrination Course provided new Navy Reservist Staff Corps and Restricted Line LDOs/CWOs with indoctrination training necessary to function in their role as newly commissioned Naval Officers. The course curriculum is parallel to that of the ODS, however, special caveats have been made to tailor the training to that of the Naval Reserve and its programs.
Logo of the Officer Development School	=== Mustang University (LDO/CWO Academy) === The Limited Duty Officer/Chief Warrant Officer (LDO/CWO) Academy is a four-week course designed "develop newly commissioned LDO and CWO morally, mentally, and physically and imbue them with the highest ideals of honor, courage, and commitment in order to serve in the fleet as professional naval officers worthy of special trust and confidence." Graduates of either the ODS or DCOIC attend this class after completing the initial post-commission training. Training will focus on Navy's Officer Professional Core Competencies of Naval Orientation & Officership, Leadership & Ethics, Seapower and Naval History and Programs and Policies.

== Direct officer accession ==
=== Officer Candidate School ===
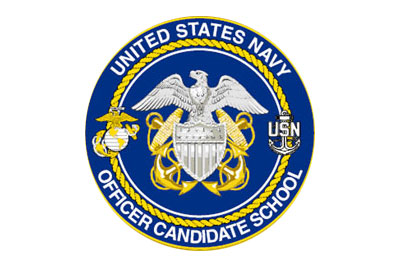
Logo for Officer Candidate School with white background

The United States Navy's Officer Candidate School (abbreviated OCS) provides initial training for officers of the line and select operational Staff Corps communities (Supply and CEC) in the United States Navy. Qualified U.S. citizens who hold a bachelor's degree meet with an Officer Recruiter and prepare application packages for consideration. Applications are then submitted to specific communities, rather than to OCS directly, who then select individuals for each group.

Candidates will then attend OCS for thirteen weeks of training, consisting of basic military training, physical training, and classroom training on the Navy's Officer Professional Core Competencies.

Upon graduation, Candidates will be commissioned as Ensigns (O-1) in the Navy, and will either head to the fleet or to further training.

=== Naval Science Institute and STA-21 commissioning ===
All members selected for the STA-21 program will attend 8 weeks of Naval Science Institute (NSI) as an "Officer Candidate" prior to assignment at an NROTC unit for degree completion and commissioning. The NSI course builds upon previous naval experience and is designed to teach each selectee the fundamental core concepts of officership and the high ideals of a military officer.

Upon completion of NSI, STA-21 selectees are then assigned to the NROTC unit for drill, physical training, and receive two courses in leadership prior to commissioning. They will continue to receive active duty pay and benefits while they are completing their education at the NROTC-affiliated university/college. They must complete the degree within 36 months of assignment.

The largest difference between NROTC Midshipmen and STA-21 NROTC Officer Candidates is that while NROTC Midshipmen are on reserve duty (except during summer annual training), STA-21 Officer Candidates attached to NROTC units will remain on active duty while attending the university.
