= Annie B. Andrews =

United States Navy Rear Admiral

Rear Admiral Annie B. Andrews
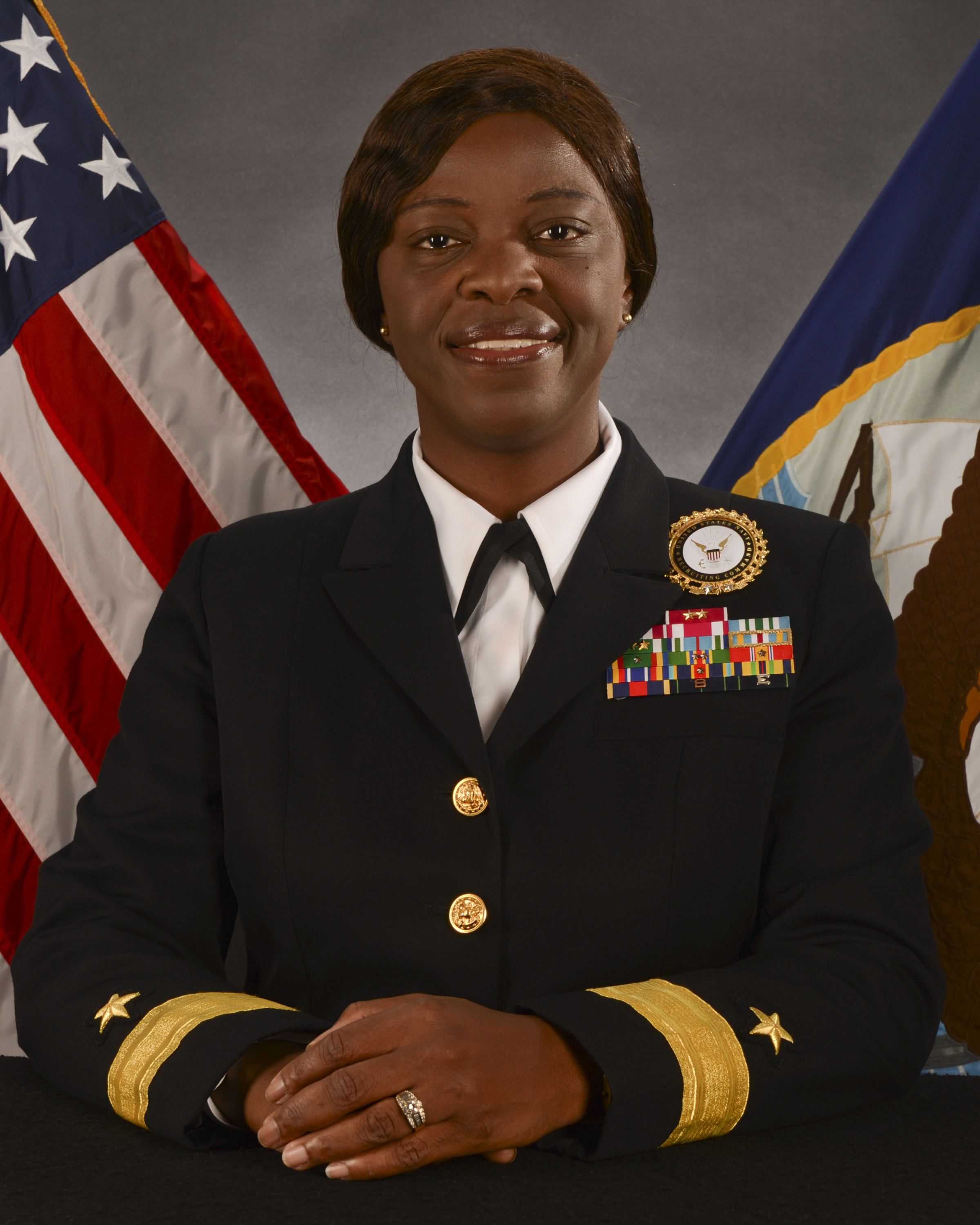
- Born: Annie Belle Andrews; 1959 (age 66–67)
- Education: Savannah State University
- Military career
- Allegiance: United States
- Branch: United States Navy
- Service years: 1983–2015
- Rank: Rear admiral (lower half)
- Commands: U.S. Navy Recruiting Command

Annie Belle Andrews (born 1959) is a former assistant administrator for human resources management in the Federal Aviation Administration, and a former rear admiral in the US Navy, serving in the areas of manpower, personnel, training and education. She is the third African-American woman to reach the rank of rear admiral in the US Navy.

== Education ==
Andrews graduated in 1977 from Philadelphia High School for Girls, a public magnet school for academically gifted students.

Andrews graduated from Savannah State University with a Bachelor's in Criminal Justice, before earning her master's degree in management from Troy State University. During her military career, she earned an additional master's degree in National Security and Strategic Studies from the Naval War College. She has an honorary Doctorate of Humane Letters from Wilson College.

== Career ==
=== U.S. Navy ===
Andrews joined the Navy in 1983, beginning her career at Naval Station Whiting Field in Florida, where she served as an administrative assistant officer in Training Air Wing 5, and as a Flight Simulator coordinator for Helicopter Training Squadron 8. Her next assignment as an intelligence officer at the Joint Intelligence Center Pacific in Hawaii.

After these initial deployments, Andrews rose to several leadership roles. Her first such role was as Director of Counseling and Assistance, Naval Air Station Keflavik, Iceland. Next, she served as Officer-in-charge, Navy Personnel Support Activity Detachments in the Philippines.

Andrews then moved to Washington, DC, where she assumed several more leadership roles. First, Andrews served as Branch Head of the Deserter Apprehension Program. Then, she served as Chief of the Requirements Branch in the Manpower Planning division. She later became the Executive Assistant to the Assistant Secretary of the Navy for Manpower and Reserves Affairs.

Andrews moved from Washington, D.C. to Rhode Island when she was appointed as a Senior Fellow in the Chief of Naval Operations Strategic Studies Group. She then served as the director of Total Force Requirements Division, prior to entering what would become her last line of Navy work – recruiting. Andrews served as the Commanding Officer of both the Boston Military Entrance Processing and Recruit Training Command, Great Lakes. There, she oversaw the training of over 100,000 sailors.

Starting in 2013, as a rear admiral, Andrews served as commander of U.S. Navy Recruiting Command. As the top recruiter in the U.S. Navy, she oversaw all recruiting for both the Active and Reserve components of the Navy.

=== Federal Aviation Administration ===
In 2015, Andrews retired from the Navy after 32 years of service and moved into a civilian role in the FAA. As Assistant Administrator for Human Resources Management, she oversaw strategic partnerships between the FAA and human resource services for the FAA's 46,000 employees. She led the FAA's employee programs and policies, corporate development, and compensation until her retirement in January 2022.

== Awards ==
- Legion of Merit
- Defense Meritorious Service Medal
- Joint Service Commendation Medal
- Joint Service Achievement Medal
- 2013 Stars & Stripes Award for Leadership
- 2015 Women of Color Lifetime Achievement Award
