= Recruit Training Command, Great Lakes, Illinois =

U.S. Navy command unit for recruit training

Coordinates: 42°18′5.3″N 87°51′9.6″W

Recruit Training Command Great Lakes
- Seal of Recruit Training Command
- Founded: 1 July 1911; 115 years ago
- Country: United States
- Branch: United States Navy
- Role: Recruit training
- Part of: Naval Service Training Command
- Garrison/HQ: Naval Station Great Lakes; North Chicago, Illinois, U.S.
- Motto: "The Quarterdeck of the Navy"
- Website: bootcamp.navy.mil

Commanders
- Commanding officer: CAPT Kent Davis, USN
- Executive officer: CDR America E. Estevez Guerrero, USN
- Command master chief: CMDCM Josephine Tauoa, USN

The Recruit Training Command, Great Lakes (RTC Great Lakes), is a command unit within the United States Navy primarily responsible for conducting the initial orientation of incoming recruits, also known as boot camp and recruit training, or RTC. It is part of Naval Service Training Command. It is a tenant command of Naval Station Great Lakes in the city of North Chicago, Illinois, in Lake County, north of Chicago.

Called "The Quarterdeck of the Navy" since it opened in July 1911, RTC Great Lakes has been the service's only enlisted basic training location since 1994, when the Recruit Training Command in Orlando, Florida, was closed under the BRAC process. The similar RTC San Diego, California, was closed the previous year.

All enlistees into the U.S. Navy begin their service at RTC Great Lakes with at least ten weeks of training, and more if they do not pass certain tests. Upon completion of basic training, qualifying sailors are sent to various apprenticeship, or "A schools", located across the United States for training in their occupational speciality, or ratings. Those who have not yet received a specific rating enter the fleet with a general designation of airman, fireman, construction man or seaman.

== History ==
After the Spanish–American War, the U.S. Navy began investigating 37 sites around Lake Michigan for a new training center in the Midwest, an area that contributed 43 percent of the Navy's recruits at the time.

The main proponent of the North Chicago location was Illinois Congressional Representative and chairman of the Committee on Naval Affairs (1900–1911) George Edmund Foss, later called "The Father of Great Lakes". Foss Park, just north of the base, is named in his honor. It is likely the facility would have been located elsewhere had it not been for the $175,000 contribution of the Merchants Club of Chicago to purchase the land.

Rear Admiral Albert A. Ross was the station's first commander and the base's Ross Field and Ross Auditorium were later named in his honor. The first flag was planted on site on 1 July 1905. President William H. Taft dedicated the station six years later on 28 October 1911. In that same year, the station received its first trainee, Seaman Recruit Joseph W. Gregg.

Naval Station Great Lakes was at the forefront of the racial integration of the Navy. African-Americans were permitted to enlist for general service in the middle of 1942 receiving training at Great Lakes as well as Hampton, Virginia. Previously they had been restricted to special duties. The Navy commissioned its first African-American officers, later known as the "Golden Thirteen", at Great Lakes in February 1944. In July 1987, building 1405, the Golden Thirteen Recruit In-Processing Center, was dedicated in their honor. The surviving eight attended the ceremony.

Navy recruit training is exclusively conducted at Naval Station Great Lakes' Recruit Training Command, thanks to the decision by the Base Realignment and Closure Commission of 1993 to close Naval Training Center San Diego and Naval Training Center Orlando (formerly the only training center for female recruits). To accommodate the consolidation, the Navy renovated and expanded the Great Lakes Recruit Training facility, building Camp John Paul Jones, a 48-acre (190,000 m^{2}) site on land formerly owned by the Veterans Administration Hospital next to Camp Porter. New barracks ("ships" to recruits) for up to 1,300 recruits apiece were also constructed and named for important ships in naval history, such as USS John F. Kennedy and USS Enterprise.

A 210-foot (64 m) Arleigh Burke-class destroyer simulator called USS Trayer (BST-21) was built to serve as part of the Battle Stations 21 (BST 21) training facility.

== Facilities ==
=== USS Enterprise (BLDG 7115) ===
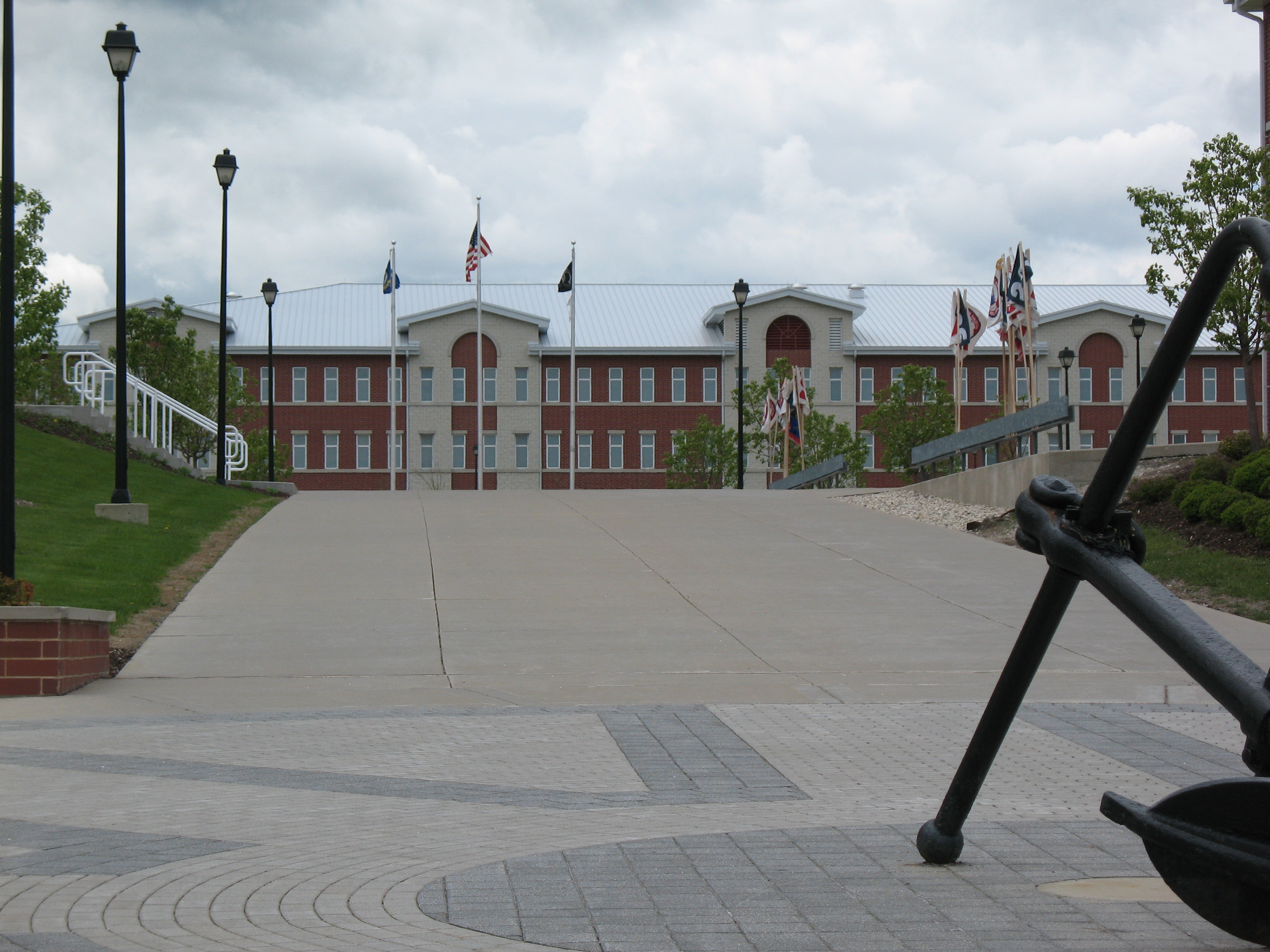
USS Enterprise (BLDG 7115)

The USS Enterprise Recruit Barracks Building is the eighth of fourteen built as part of a $763 million recapitalization program.

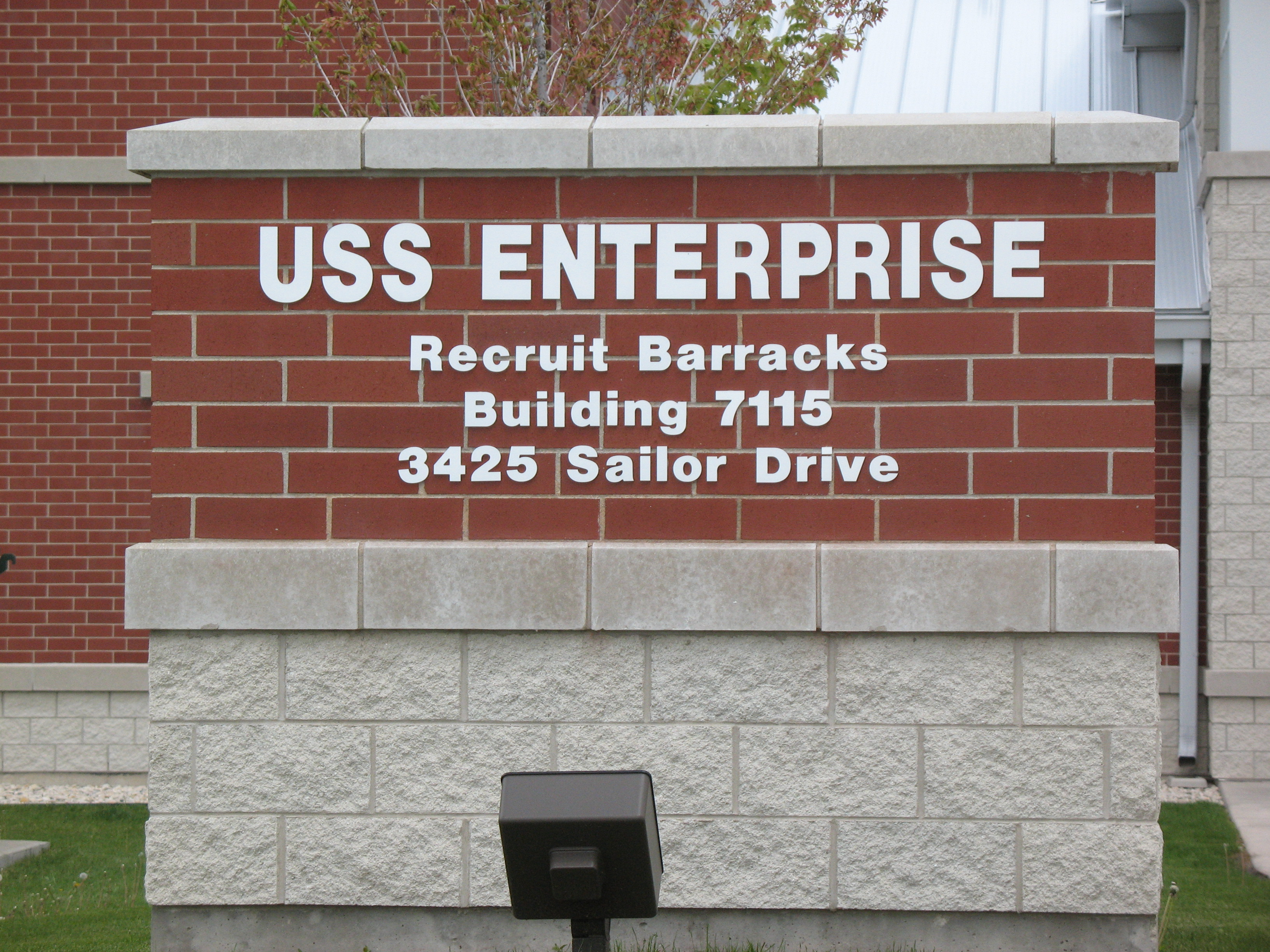
USS Enterprise Recruit Barracks

The building is named after the eight USS Enterprises that have borne the name, including the two famous aircraft carriers pictured around the building's quarterdeck. The first is CV-6, which was a ship of the Yorktown class launched in 1936 (the most decorated Navy ship in history) and one of only three American carriers commissioned prior to World War II to survive the war. The nautical flags hanging on the quarterdeck of BLDG 7115 are from CV-6. The second is CVN-65, the world's first nuclear-powered aircraft carrier. Many of the displays on the quarterdeck of USS Enterprise (BLDG 7115) were donated by USS Enterprise (CVN-65).

The USS Enterprise (BLDG 7115) has 120,000 square feet (11,000 m^{2}) of space, enough to accommodate 16 recruit divisions of up to 88 recruits each. This facility integrates berthing, classrooms, learning resource centers, a galley, and a quarterdeck, all under one roof. Each "ship" has a ship's officer who fills the role of commanding officer, a ship's leading chief petty officer who fills the role of command master chief, and a chaplain.

=== USS Triton Recruit Barracks (Ship 12) ===
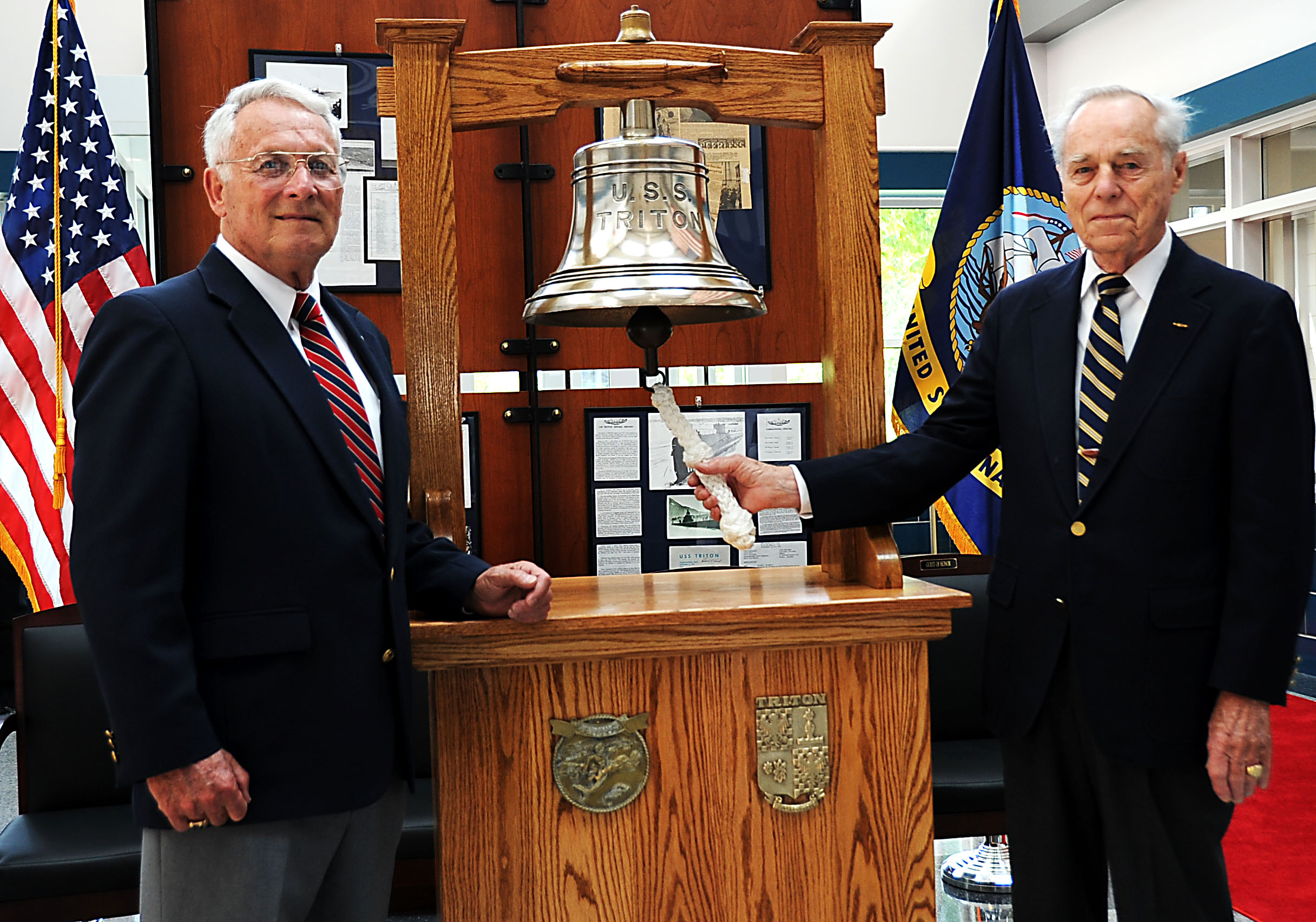
USS Triton bell dedication ceremony

USS Triton Recruit Barracks (Ship 12) was dedicated in ceremonies held on 25 June 2004. The facility honors the memory of two submarines named Triton and includes memorabilia from both ships, USS Triton (SS-201) and USS Triton (SSRN-586). Triton Hall is the fifth barracks constructed under the RTC Recapitalization Project, covering 172,000 square feet (15,979 square meters) in floor space. The facility is designed to accommodate 1056 recruits, and it includes berthing, classrooms, learning resource centers, a galley, a quarterdeck, and a modern HVAC system. On 17 May 2012, in a dedication ceremony, the long-missing ship's bell was added to the collection of artifacts in Recruit Training Command's USS Triton recruit barracks quarterdeck (pictured).

== Training timeline ==
RTC is a 10-week process, including initial processing, intended to teach fundamental naval discipline, teamwork, and water survival skills.

Phase	Weeks	Focus & Key Events
Arrival & Indoctrination (Processing-Days)	1	Processing, haircuts, uniform issue, medical screenings. Sleep deprivation and establishing immediate discipline.
Foundational Skills	2–4	Seamanship, Navy knowledge, core values, basic drill, hands-on firefighting, and the first Physical Fitness Assessment (PFA).
Advanced Training	5–7	Weapons training, advanced damage control, intensive academic courses, and the Third-Class Swim Qualification.
Capstone & Graduation	8–10	Battle Stations 21 (the 12-hour final test), final PFA, and graduation preparations. Recruits earn the title "Sailor."

=== Processing Week ===
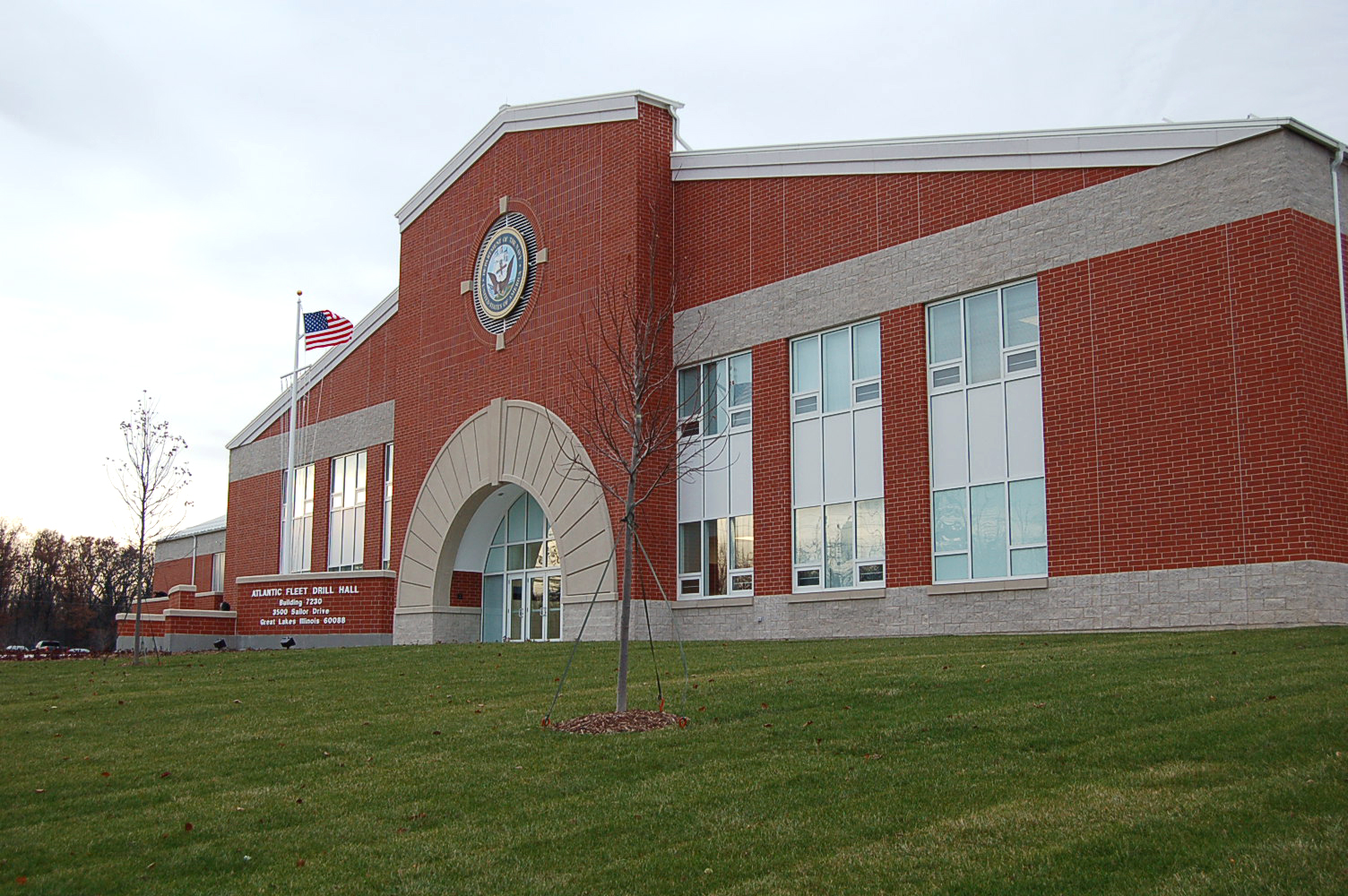
The Atlantic Fleet Drill Hall in Camp John Paul Jones at RTC Great Lakes, completed in December 2007

Processing days, also referred to as "P-Days" last five or more days depending on weekends, holidays, and the schedule of arriving recruits.

Recruits begin at Building 1405, Golden Thirteen, the Recruit In-processing Center in Camp Moffett. Recruits arrive at all hours, but mostly during the night. Before formal training starts, recruits are screened medically, dentally, and administratively. They receive inoculations, an initial issue of uniforms, and their first military haircut. They are introduced to their recruit division commander (drill instructor).

They are taught basic grooming standards, the Uniform Code of Military Justice (UCMJ), and standards of conduct. Recruits are taught the basics of watch standing, are given information to memorize, and begin learning to organize their equipment.

Around their fifth day of training, recruits must pass their baseline Physical Fitness Assessment. Those who fail will be set back in training and offered a few more opportunities to pass. Should they still fail, they will be separated/discharged from the Navy. P-days conclude with a commissioning ceremony, led by the recruits' group commander (ship's leading chief petty officer), in which each division's guidon (divisional flag with division number) is unrolled. This ceremony marks the official start of their training.

=== Week One ===
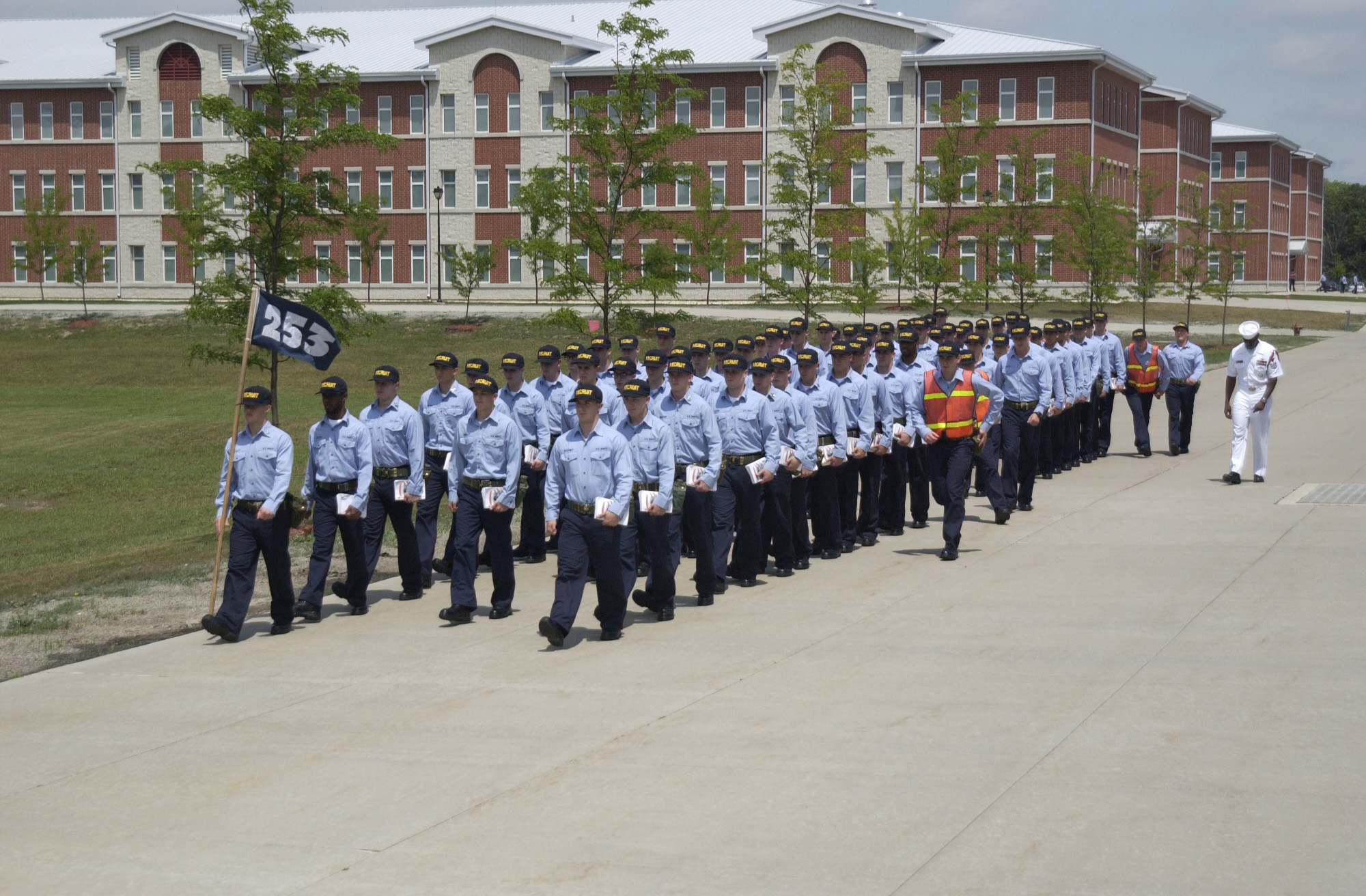
Recruits march from their "ship" barracks named for USS Chicago (SSN-721)

During the first week recruits undergo physical conditioning, take their initial Swim Qualification Test and learn military drill, the details of rank and rating, and the Navy core values.

=== Week Two ===
Recruits learn the Navy chain of command, custom and courtesies, and basic watchstanding.

=== Week Three ===
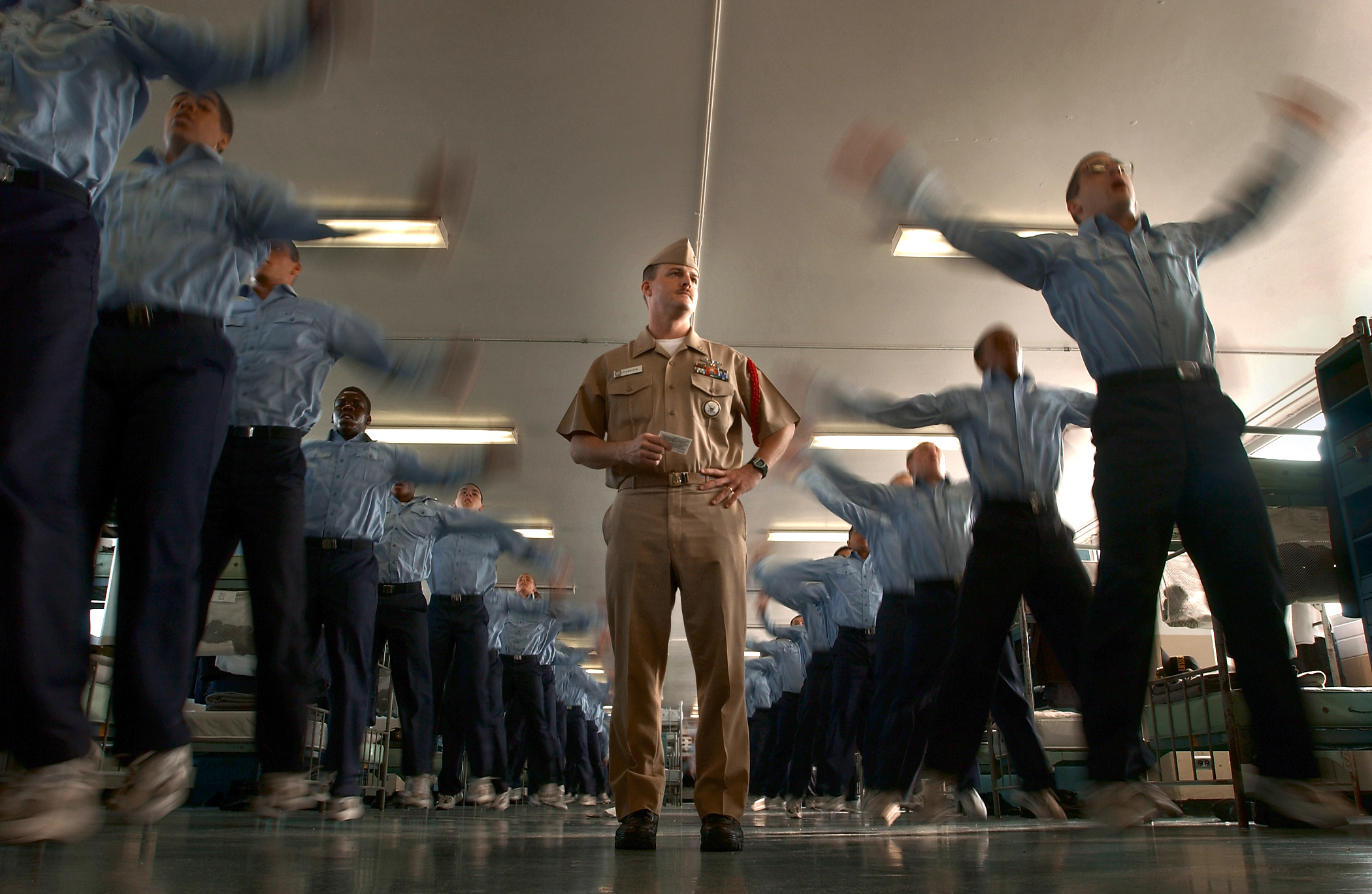
A Recruit Division Commander conducts "Instructional Training" to correct substandard performance during boot camp

Week Three consists of hands-on training. Recruits learn laws of armed conflict, personal finance, basic seamanship, shipboard communication, and Navy ship and aircraft identification. Recruits also take their first physical training test, called the RDC Assessment, performing as many push-ups as they can in two minutes, holding a plank for as long as possible (max time of 3 minutes and 26 seconds), and running 1.5-mile (2.4 km) for time. The time standards for the run and the number of push-ups are based on the recruits' ages, which range from 17 to 42. Recruits receive their first paychecks.

=== Week Four ===
Week Four mostly consists of weapons training. Recruits receive a classroom lecture on firearms safety and learn to use and fire the M18 pistol.

Recruits no longer receive training with the M9 pistol, M500 shotgun, the M16 rifle, the M1 Garand, or .22 single-shot rifles.

=== Week Five ===
Week Five consists of learning more drill instructions needed for the military drill assessment. Week Five was also called "Service Week", previously as this was when new recruits take over the daily chores necessary to keep the base running. However, since the redesign of RTC recruits no longer participate in all aspects of daily chores. It had this moniker because this is the most inspection and test intensive week.

=== Week Six ===
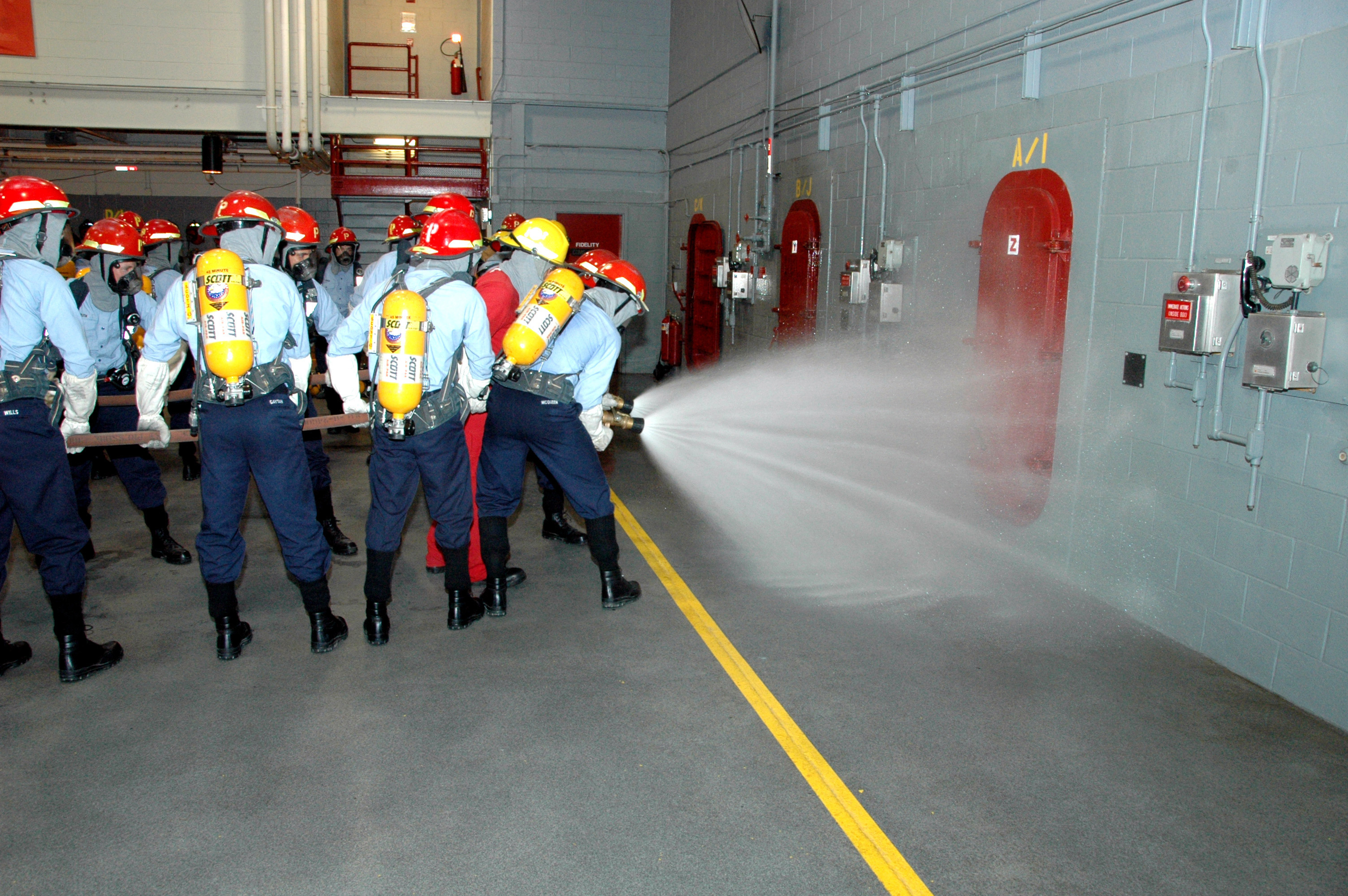
Training at the Recruit Training Command's fire fighting school

During Week Six, recruits learn shipboard damage control and firefighting skills. Recruits will learn to escape smoke-filled compartments, open and close watertight doors, use self-contained breathing apparatus (SCBAs), carry fire hoses and learn to extinguish fires. Week Six also includes the Confidence Chamber (tear gas chamber).

=== Week Seven ===
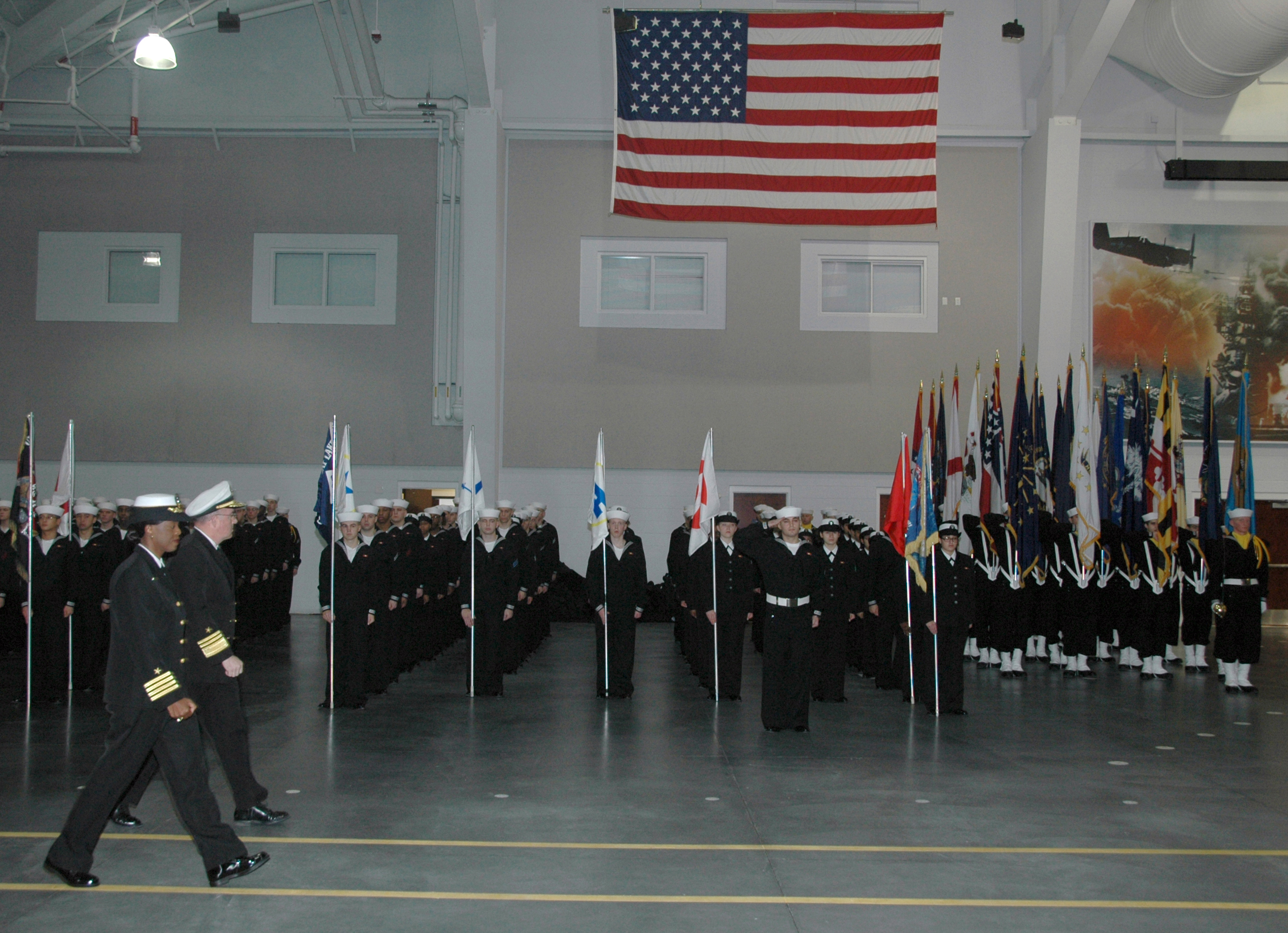
A recruit graduation at the USS Midway Ceremonial Drill Hall in January 2008

During Week Seven, recruits complete their firefighting assessment and their final personnel inspection.

=== Week 8 ===
This week is centered on two major tests that determine a recruit's fitness and operational readiness.

Battle Stations 21 is a 12-hour comprehensive exam and capstone event. It is designed to test a recruit's ability to operate under stress, fatigue, and as a cohesive team. The test takes place aboard the USS Trayer, a 210-foot-long simulator of an Arleigh Burke-class guided-missile destroyer. Recruits must successfully complete 17 high-stress, simulated shipboard scenarios that require them to apply all the skills they've learned:

- Damage control: Fighting simulated fires in full gear and patching severe pipe leaks (flooding).
- Mass casualty drills: Coordinating triage and administering first aid to injured personnel.
- Watchstanding: Standing watch on the bridge, in engineering, and on the deck.
- Security: Responding to terrorism and hostile attack scenarios.

Upon successful completion, the recruits attend the Capping Ceremony. They trade their "RECRUIT" cap for the "NAVY" cap, signifying their change in status to U.S. Navy sailor. Recruits are then sworn to secrecy about the specifics of the BST test.

To graduate, recruits must also pass the final physical fitness assessment:

Event	Minimum Male Standard (17–24)	Minimum Female Standard (17–24)	Competitive Goal (Both)
1.5-Mile Run	12:15 or less	14:45 or less	Sub-11:00
Push-Ups (2 min)	46 reps or more	20 reps or more	60+
Plank Hold	1:30 or longer	1:30 or longer	2:30+
Swim Qual	Pass/Fail (Third-Class Qualification)	Pass/Fail (Third-Class Qualification)	Under 9:00

Finally, each sailor must pass a water survival assessment by jumping from a 10-foot tower, swimming 50 yards, floating prone for five minutes, and treading water while correctly inflating trousers or a shirt for buoyancy.

=== Week 9 ===
With the core training complete, the focus shifts to professional life skills and administrative processing.

Sailor for Life

This module focuses on ensuring the new sailors are prepared for life in the fleet. It covers:

- Professional development: Reinforcing the Navy's core values, ethics, and leadership principles.
- Life skills: Financial management, career planning, and resilience training.
- Mentorship: New Sailors receive final, focused mentorship to help them transition from the strict structure of boot camp to the day-to-day life of a Sailor.

Administrative and logistics

- Final inspection: Divisions undergo a final drill and personnel inspection, which must be passed.
- Final uniform issue: New Sailors receive their final issue of uniforms and civilian clothing allowance.
- Orders and travel: Recruits finalize their travel arrangements and receive their orders for their next duty station, typically an "A-School" for job training.

=== Week 10 ===
The final week culminates in the traditional public graduation ceremony called the Pass-In-Review. The new sailors execute precise military drill movements in a large ceremonial drill hall in front of their families. Immediately after the ceremony, Sailors are granted their first period of liberty (time off base) to spend with their families until a set curfew, before they leave for their "A-School."

== Gallery ==
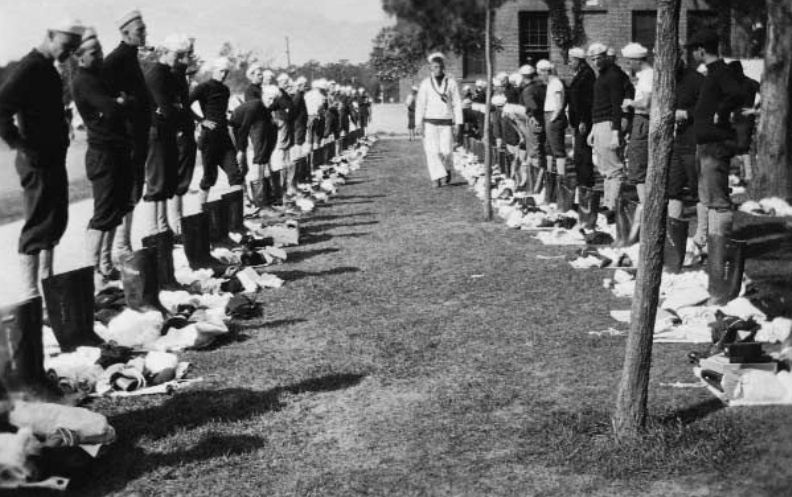
An inspection during World War I

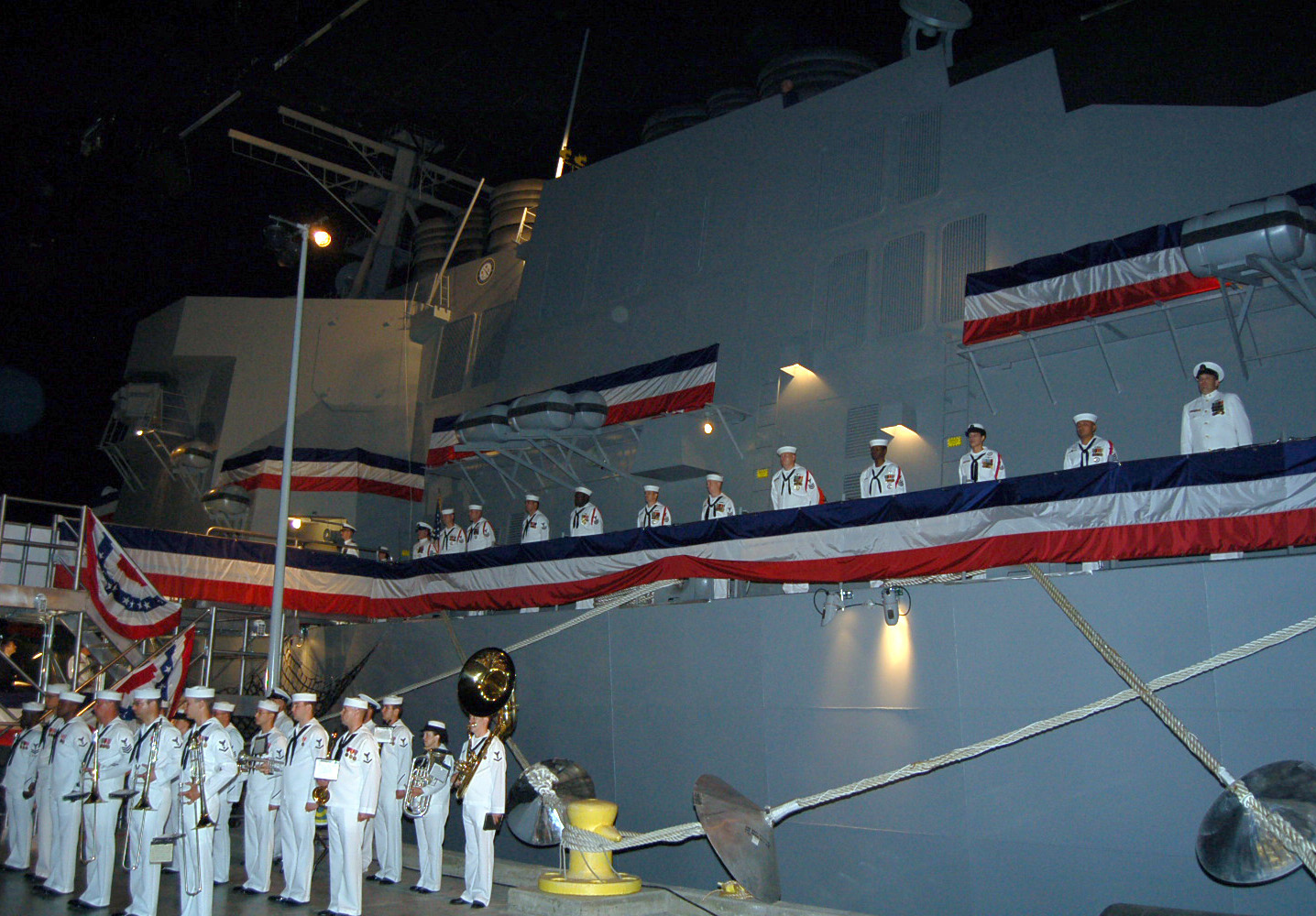
Recruits man the rails of the training simulator, USS Trayer (BST-21), which was completed in June 2007

2008 photo of recruits in hammocks at RTC Great Lakes

2013 recruiting video for instructors

A video overview of navy boot camp

2009 video overview of Navy boot camp

2018 documentary about U.S. Navy boot camp: Part one

2018 documentary: part two

2018 documentary: part three

2018 documentary: part four

2018 documentary: part five

2018 documentary: part six

2021 condensed graduation ceremony due to COVID-19 mitigation measures.

2026 full-fledged graduation ceremony for new sailors
