= United States Navy Recruiting Command =

U.S. Navy's primary source of recruitment

Navy Recruiting Command
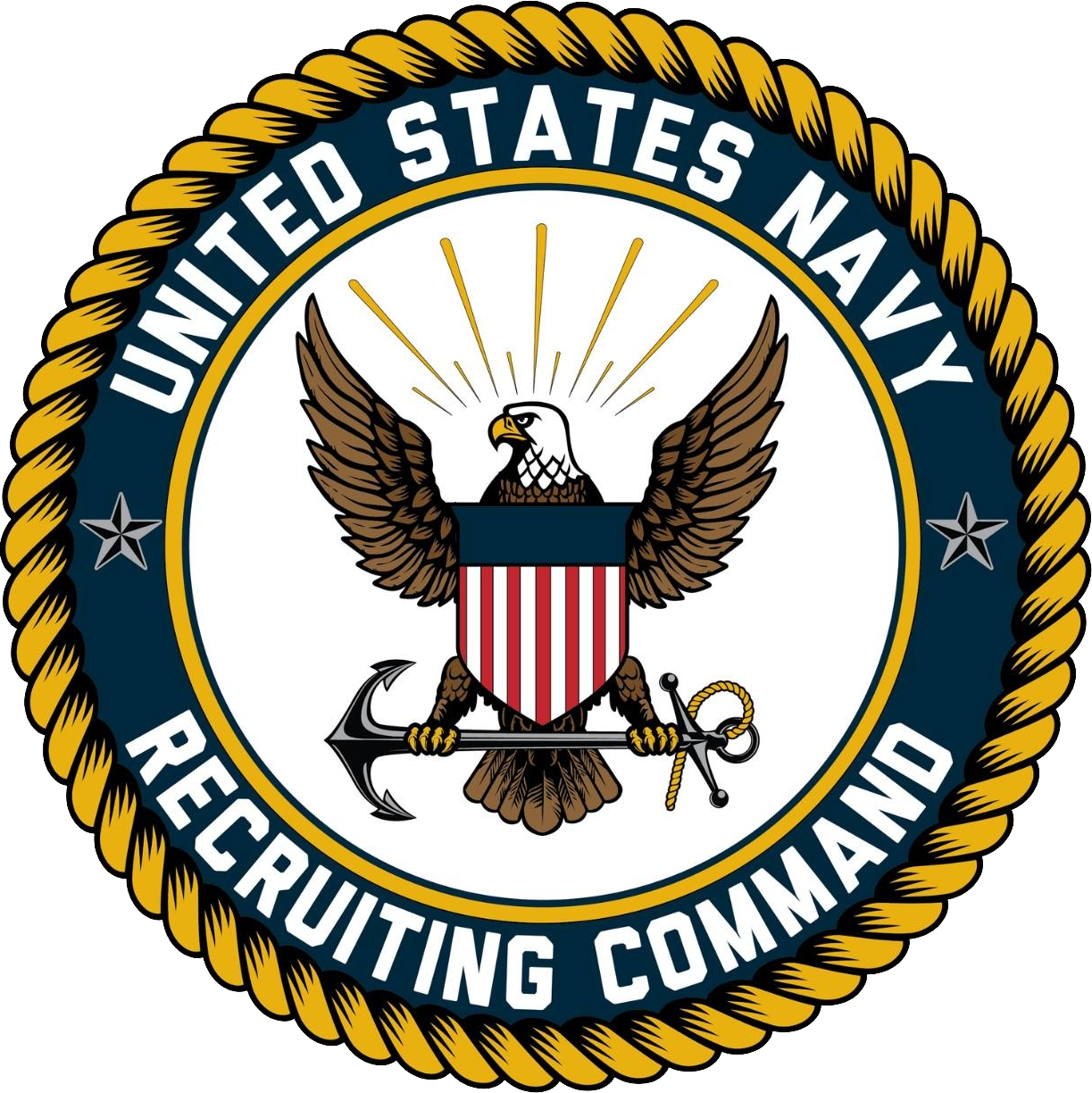
- Seal
- Founded: 1942
- Country: United States
- Branch: United States Navy
- Type: Command of the United States Navy
- Size: 7,200
- Garrison/HQ: Millington, Tennessee
- Motto: "Forged by the Sea”
- Website: http://www.cnrc.navy.mil/

Commanders
- Current commander: Rear Admiral Forrest Young, USN

The United States Navy Recruiting Command (NRC or NAVCRUITCOM) is located in Millington, Tennessee. It aims to recruit both enlisted sailors and prospective commissioned officers for the United States Navy. NRC covers the entire United States with 26 Navy Talent Acquisition Groups commanded by two Navy Recruiting Regions; Regions East and West. In 2018, accessions management and distribution functions of the Bureau of Naval Personnel (BUPERS) were realigned under Naval Education and Training Command (NETC) and Navy Recruiting Command now serves as a subordinate command to NETC.

As of 2026, the Commander, Navy Recruiting Command is Rear Admiral Forrest Young.

NRC received the Meritorious Unit Commendation for the period October 1, 2007 through September 30, 2008.

== See also ==
- Navy Personnel Command/Bureau of Naval Personnel

Comparable organizations

- United States Army Recruiting Command
- Marine Corps Recruiting Command (U.S. Marine Corps)
- Air Education and Training Command (U.S. Air Force)
