= Jeffrey J. Czerewko =

American Navy admiral (born 1968)

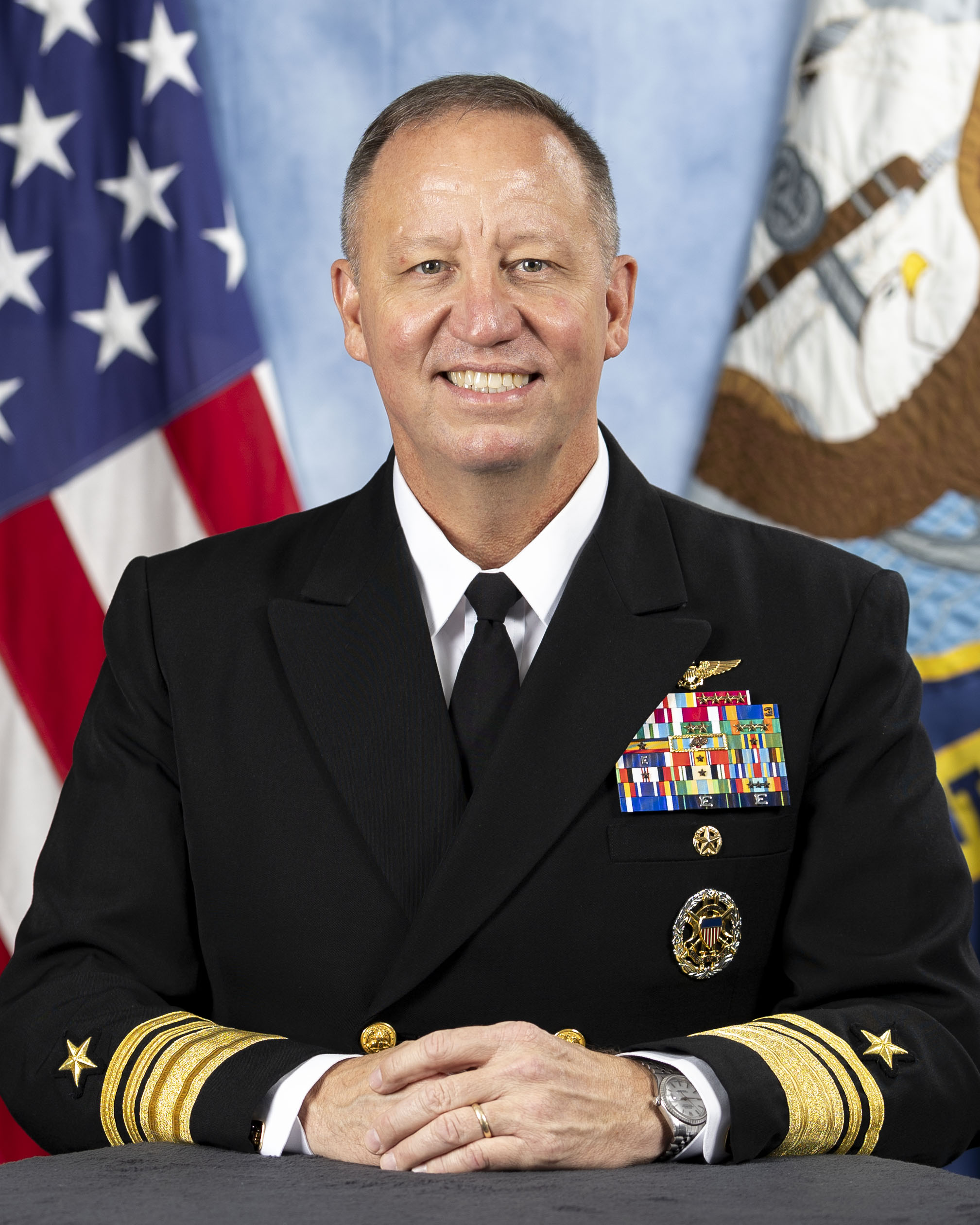
- Born: Jeffrey John Czerewko; 1968 (age 57–58)
- Allegiance: United States
- Branch: United States Navy
- Rank: Chief of Naval Personnel
- Commands: Naval Education and Training Command; Carrier Strike Group Four; Carrier Air Wing Two; Strike Fighter Squadron 146
- Conflicts: Bosnian Intervention; War in Afghanistan; Iraq War
- Awards: Defense Superior Service Medal; Legion of Merit (5); Defense Meritorious Service Medal (2); Meritorious Service Medal; Air Medal (3)
- Education: United States Naval Academy; National War College

Vice Adm. Jeffrey Czerewko (born 1968) is an American military officer. A native of Saginaw, Michigan, he is a 1990 graduate of the United States Naval Academy with a B.S. degree in General Science. He also holds an M.S. degree in National Security Strategy from the National War College. After completing flight training, Czerewko was designated a naval aviator in February 1993.

At sea, as a junior officer he deployed with Attack Squadron 75 aboard USS Enterprise and with Strike Fighter Squadron 81 aboard USS Dwight D. Eisenhower, both assigned to Carrier Air Wing Seventeen. He completed his department head tour with Strike Fighter Squadron 136, attached to Carrier Air Wing Seven aboard USS John F. Kennedy and USS George Washington. He commanded Strike Fighter Squadron 146 and deployed twice with USS John C. Stennis assigned to Carrier Air Wing Nine. He also commanded Carrier Air Wing Two while assigned to USS Ronald Reagan as the strike warfare commander for Carrier Strike Group 9. Czerewko participated in the Bosnian Intervention, war in Afghanistan and Iraq War.

Czerewko also served with the Naval Special Warfare Development Group (DEVGRU) and deployed as battle director with the Combined Air and Space Operations Center, Al Udeid Air Base, Qatar.

Ashore, he was a fleet replacement squadron instructor pilot assigned to Strike Fighter Squadron 106 as assistant safety officer and assistant training officer; electronic warfare branch chief for the Joint Staff deputy director for Global Operations (J-39); and resource sponsor for Naval Intelligence, Surveillance and Reconnaissance Capabilities as director, Battlespace Awareness. He also stood up the Digital Warfare Office on the Navy Staff, and served as chief of staff for Commander, Naval Air Forces.

As a flag officer, Czerewko served as the deputy director for Global Operations (J-39) on the Joint Staff; director for Fleet Integrated Readiness and Analysis, United States Fleet Forces Command; Commander, Carrier Strike Group Four and as the 21st commander of Naval Education and Training Command.

Czerewko assumed duties as the Navy's 61st chief of naval personnel on August 1, 2025. He serves concurrently as the deputy chief of naval operations (Personnel, Manpower, and Training) (N1). Czerewko leads upwards of 26,000 professionals focused on recruiting, developing, and managing Navy personnel, ensuring they remain ready to meet the demands of global naval operations.

Czerewko is the recipient of various personal awards and unit decorations and the Navy and Marine Association Leadership Award in 2002 and 2004. He has received the Defense Superior Service Medal, five awards of the Legion of Merit, two awards of the Defense Meritorious Service Medal, the Meritorious Service Medal and three awards of the Air Medal.

Czerewko married fellow 1990 Naval Academy graduate Dianna Maria Manzoni, a native of Paulsboro, New Jersey. Dianna Czerewko served on active duty as a surface warfare officer and naval meteorologist until 1997, including a tour as navigator of the destroyer tender USS Shenandoah. After three additional years in the Navy Reserve, she retired to concentrate on their growing family. Jeffrey and Dianna Czerewko have eight children.

== Service summary ==
=== Dates of rank ===
Promotions
Rank	Date
Ensign	09 March 1990
Lieutenant Commander	24 September 1999
Commander	22 July 2004
Captain	30 June 2011
Rear admiral lower half	28 February 2019
Rear admiral	02 May 2024
Vice admiral	31 July 2025

Military offices
Preceded by Richard Cheeseman Jr.	Chief of Naval Personnel; 2025–Present	Incumbent
