= Bureau of Naval Personnel =

U.S. Navy's human resources bureau

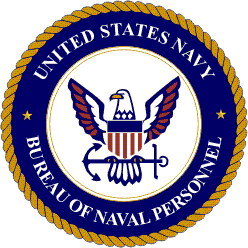
- Founded: 1862; 164 years ago
- Country: United States
- Allegiance: United States of America
- Branch: United States Navy
- Type: Bureau
- Role: Military Personnel Management
- Website: MyNavy HR

Commanders
- Chief of Naval Personnel: VADM Jeffrey J. Czerewko

The Bureau of Naval Personnel (BUPERS) in the United States Department of the Navy leads personnel management and policy support functions for the Office of the Chief of Naval Operations (OPNAV) and the U.S. Navy at large. BUPERS is led by the Chief of Naval Personnel (CNP), who serves "dual-hatted" as the Deputy Chief of Naval Operations (DCNO) for Total Force (N1).

As of October 2026, the Bureau of Naval Personnel serves as an echelon II parent command to Navy Personnel Command. Commander, Navy Personnel Command (CNPC) is "dual-hatted" as the Deputy Chief of Naval Personnel (DCNP). Most BUPERS offices are located on board Naval Support Activity Mid-South in Millington, Tennessee, with a small BUPERS staff directly supporting the CNP in Arlington County, Virginia.

== History ==
Naval personnel matters were originally handled by the Secretary of War until the establishment of the Navy Department on April 30, 1798. It was not until 1815 that the Secretary of the Navy took control of personnel matters. In 1861, the Office of Detail was created and functions related to the detailing of officers and the appointment and instruction of volunteer officers, as well as the purchase of ships and related matters were transferred. The Bureau of Equipment and Recruiting was concurrently established to handle enlisted recruiting and service record maintenance.

The Bureau of Navigation was established in 1862 and three years later the Office of Detail was placed under it. In 1889, the Bureau of Equipment and Recruiting transferred its enlisted personnel activities to the Bureau of Navigation as well. On May 13, 1942, the command's name changed to the Bureau of Naval Personnel, and in 1982 it changed to Naval Military Personnel Command. In 1991, the name changed back to the Bureau of Naval Personnel or "BUPERS" for short.

In the late 1990s, BUPERS relocated to Millington, Tennessee, based on the recommendation of the Base Closure and Realignment Commission (BRAC). DCNP relocated to Millington as well and assumed primary duties as CNPC. A support staff remained in the Washington, D.C. area to support CNP. As a result, the offices of CNP and DCNP are located in separate geographic regions.
