= List of United States Navy vice admirals since 2020 =

Flag of a Navy vice admiral

The rank of vice admiral (or three-star admiral) is the second-highest rank normally achievable in the United States Navy, and the first to have a specified number of appointments set by statute. It ranks above rear admiral (two-star admiral) and below admiral (four-star admiral).

There have been 58 vice admirals in the U.S. Navy since 1 January 2020, six of whom were promoted to four-star admiral. All 57 achieved that rank while on active duty in the U.S. Navy. Admirals entered the Navy via several paths: 27 were commissioned via Naval Reserve Officers Training Corps (NROTC) at a civilian university, 23 via the U.S. Naval Academy (USNA), four via Aviation Officer Candidate School (AOCS), two via Officer Candidate School (OCS), one via direct commission (direct), and one via the California State University Maritime Academy (CSU Maritime).

== List of admirals ==
Entries in the following list of vice admirals are indexed by the numerical order in which each officer was promoted to that rank while on active duty, or by an asterisk (*) if the officer did not serve in that rank while on active duty. Each entry lists the admiral's name, date of rank, (Note: Dates of rank are taken, where available, from the U.S. Navy register of active and retired commissioned officers, or from the monthly U.S. Navy flag officer roster. The date listed is that of the officer's first promotion to vice admiral. If such a date that qualifies for the above cannot be found, the next date substituted should be that of the officer's assumption of his/her first three-star appointment. Failing which, the officer's first Senate confirmation date to vice admiral should be substituted. For officers promoted to vice admiral on the same date, they should be organized first by officers promoted to four-star rank, number of years spent as a vice admiral, then by the tier of their first listed assignment upon promotion to vice admiral (joint assignments followed by service assignments).) active-duty positions held while serving at three-star rank, (Note: Positions listed are those held by the officer when promoted to vice admiral. Dates listed are for the officer's full tenure, which may predate promotion to three-star rank or postdate retirement from active duty. Positions held in an acting capacity are italicized.) number of years of active-duty service at three-star rank (Yrs), (Note: The number of years of active-duty service at three-star rank is approximated by subtracting the year in the "Date of rank" column from the last year in the "Position" column. Time spent between active-duty three-star assignments is not counted.) year commissioned and source of commission, (Note: The year commissioned is taken to be the year the officer graduated from the U.S. Naval Academy, or equivalent. Sources of commission are listed in parentheses after the year of commission and include: the United States Naval Academy (USNA); Naval Reserve Officers Training Corps (NROTC) at a civilian university; NROTC at a senior military college such as the Virginia Military Institute (VMI), Norwich University (Norwich), Pennsylvania Military College (PMC), or Widener University (Widener); Officer Candidate School (OCS); Aviation Officer Candidate School (AOCS); warrant; the Massachusetts Maritime Academy (MMA); United States Military Academy (USMA); and the United States Air Force Academy (USAFA).) number of years in commission when promoted to three-star rank (YC), (Note: The number of years in commission before being promoted to three-star rank is approximated by subtracting the year in the "Commission" column from the year in the "Date of rank" column.) and other biographical notes. (Note: Notes include years of birth and death; awards of the Medal of Honor, Congressional Gold Medal, Presidential Medal of Freedom, or honors of similar significance; major government appointments; university presidencies or equivalents; familial relationships with significant military officers or significant government officials such as U.S. Presidents, cabinet secretaries, U.S. Senators, or state governors; and unusual career events such as premature relief or death in office.)

List of U.S. Navy vice admirals since 2020
#	Name	Photo	Date of rank	Position	Yrs	Commission	YC	Notes
1	Randy B. Crites		15 May 2020	Deputy Chief of Naval Operations, Integration of Capabilities and Resources (DCNO N8), 2020–2023.	3	1985 (OCS) (Note: Commissioned via the Navy Nuclear Propulsion Officer Candidate (NUPOC) Program.)	35	(1962– )
2	Yancy B. Lindsey		29 May 2020	Commander, Navy Installations Command (CNIC), 2020–2023.	3	1986 (AOCS)	34	(1962– )
3	Eugene H. Black III		1 Jun 2020	Commander, U.S. Sixth Fleet/Commander, Task Force Six/Commander, Naval Striking and Support Forces NATO/Deputy Commander, U.S. Naval Forces Europe-Africa/Joint Force Maritime Component Commander Europe (COMSIXTHFLT/CTF-6/COMSTRIKFORNATO/DCOMCNE-CNA/JFMCC Europe), 2020–2022.; Deputy Chief of Naval Operations, Operations, Plans and Strategy (DCNO N3/N5), 2022–2024.	4	1986 (USNA)	34	(1964– )
4	Jeffrey E. Trussler		5 Jun 2020	Deputy Chief of Naval Operations, Information Warfare/Director of Naval Intelligence (DCNO N2/N6/DNI), 2020–2023.	3	1985 (NROTC)	35	(1963– )
5	William J. Galinis		19 Jun 2020	Commander, Naval Sea Systems Command (COMNAVSEA), 2020–2023.	3	1983 (USNA)	37	(1961– )
6	Michelle C. Skubic		24 Jul 2020	Director, Defense Logistics Agency (DIRDLA), 2020–2024.	4	1988 (NROTC)	32	(1966– ) Supply Corps.
7	Roy I. Kitchener		3 Aug 2020	Commander, Naval Surface Forces/Commander, Naval Surface Force, U.S. Pacific Fleet (COMNAVSURFOR/COMNAVSURFPAC), 2020–2023.	3	1984 (NROTC)	36	(1962– )
8	John B. Mustin		7 Aug 2020	Chief, U.S. Navy Reserve/Commander, Navy Reserve Force (CNR/CNRF), 2020–2024.	4	1990 (USNA)	30	(1967– ) Son of Navy vice admiral Henry C. Mustin; grandson of Navy vice admiral Lloyd M. Mustin; step-great grandson of Navy four-star admiral George D. Murray.
*	Samuel J. Paparo Jr.		19 Aug 2020	Commander, U.S. Naval Forces Central Command/Commander, U.S. Fifth Fleet/Commander, Combined Maritime Forces (COMUSNAVCENT/COMFIFTHFLT/COMCMF), 2020–2021.	1	1987 (NROTC)	33	(1964– ) (Note: Served as a combatant commander (CCDR).) Promoted to admiral, 5 May 2021.
9	Kenneth R. Whitesell		2 Oct 2020	Commander, Naval Air Forces/Commander, Naval Air Force, U.S. Pacific Fleet (COMNAVAIRFOR/COMNAVAIRPAC), 2020–2023.	3	1985 (AOCS)	35	(1961– )
10	Jeffrey W. Hughes		1 Feb 2021	Deputy Chief of Naval Operations, Warfighting Development (DCNO N7), 2021–2024.; Deputy Chief of Staff for Capability Development, Headquarters Supreme Allied Commander Transformation (DCOFS-CD), 2024–present.	4	1988 (NROTC)	33	(1966– )
11	C. Bradford Cooper II		5 May 2021	Commander, U.S. Naval Forces Central Command/Commander, U.S. Fifth Fleet/Commander, Combined Maritime Forces (COMUSNAVCENT/COMFIFTHFLT/COMCMF), 2021–2024.; Deputy Commander, U.S. Central Command (DCDRUSCENTCOM), 2024–2025.	4	1989 (USNA)	32	(1967– ) Promoted to admiral, 8 Aug 2025.
12	Kelly A. Aeschbach		7 May 2021	Commander, Naval Information Forces (COMNAVIFOR), 2021–2024.	3	1990 (NROTC)	31	(1968– )
*	Stephen T. Koehler		3 Jun 2021	Commander, U.S. Third Fleet (COMTHIRDFLT), 2021–2022.; Director, Strategy, Plans and Policy, Joint Staff, J5/Senior Member, U.S. Delegation to the U.N. Military Staff Committee (Sr. Member MSC), 2022–2024.	3	1986 (NROTC)	35	(1964– ) Promoted to admiral, 4 Apr 2024.
13	John V. Fuller		11 Jun 2021	Naval Inspector General (NAVIG), 2021–2025.	4	1987 (USNA)	34	(1965– )
14	Karl O. Thomas		8 Jul 2021	Commander, U.S. Seventh Fleet (COMSEVENTHFLT), 2021–2024.; Deputy Chief of Naval Operations, Information Warfare/Director of Naval Intelligence (DCNO N2/N6/DNI), 2024–2025.	3	1986 (NROTC)	35	(1963– ) Promoted to admiral, 1 Dec 2025.
15	Frank D. Whitworth III		30 Jul 2021	Director, Intelligence, Joint Staff, J2, 2019–2022.; Director, National Geospatial-Intelligence Agency (DIRNGA), 2022–present.	4	1989 (NROTC)	32	(1967– ) Brother-in-law of Navy vice admiral Darse E. Crandall Jr.
16	Francis D. Morley		4 Aug 2021	Principal Military Deputy to the Assistant Secretary of the Navy (Research, Development, and Acquisition) (PMD ASN(RDA)), 2021–2024.	3	1988 (NROTC)	33	(1966– )
17	Darse E. Crandall Jr.		18 Aug 2021	Judge Advocate General, U.S. Navy/U.S. Department of Defense Representative for Ocean Policy Affairs (JAG/REPOPA), 2021–2024.	3	1984 (NROTC)	37	(1962– ) Judge Advocate General's Corps. Brother-in-law of Navy vice admiral Frank D. Whitworth III.
18	Daniel W. Dwyer		20 Aug 2021	Commander, U.S. Second Fleet/Commander, Joint Force Command - Norfolk/Director, Combined Joint Operations from the Sea Center of Excellence (COMSECONDFLT/CDRJFC-NF/DIRCJOS COE), 2021–2024.; Deputy Chief of Naval Operations, Warfighting Development (DCNO N7), 2024.; Deputy Chief of Naval Operations, Operations, Plans, Strategy, and Warfighting Development (DCNO N3/N5/N7), 2024–2025.	4	1988 (CSU Maritime)	33	(1966– )
19	Carl P. Chebi		9 Sep 2021	Commander, Naval Air Systems Command (COMNAVAIR), 2021–2025.	4	1987 (NROTC)	34	(1965– )
*	William J. Houston		10 Sep 2021	Commander, Submarine Forces/Commander, Submarine Force Atlantic/Commander, Allied Submarine Command/Commander, Task Force 114/Commander, Task Force 88/Commander, Task Force 46 (COMSUBFOR/COMSUBLANT/COMASC/CTF-114/CTF-88/CTF-46), 2021–2023.	2	1990 (NROTC)	31	(1968– ) (Note: Served as Director, Naval Reactors.) Promoted to admiral, 10 Jan 2024.
20	Collin P. Green		16 Dec 2021	Deputy Commander, U.S. Special Operations Command (DCDRUSSOCOM), 2021–2024.	3	1986 (USNA)	35	(1962– ) Navy SEAL.
21	Sara A. Joyner		3 Jun 2022	Director, Force Structure, Resources and Assessment, Joint Staff, J8, 2022–present.	3	1989 (USNA)	33	(1967– )
22	Richard J. Cheeseman Jr.		3 Jun 2022	Deputy Chief of Naval Operations, Personnel, Manpower and Training/Chief of Naval Personnel (DCNO N1/CNP), 2022–2025.	3	1989 (NROTC)	33	(1966– ) (Note: Promoted directly from rank of rear admiral (lower half).)
23	Michael E. Boyle		16 Jun 2022	Commander, U.S. Third Fleet (COMTHIRDFLT), 2022–2024.; Director, Navy Staff (DNS/N09B), 2024–2026.	3	1987 (NROTC)	35	(1965– )
24	Craig A. Clapperton		4 Aug 2022	Commander, U.S. Fleet Cyber Command/Commander, U.S. Tenth Fleet/Commander, Joint Force Headquarters – Cyber (Navy) (COMFCC/COMTENTHFLT/CDRJFHQ-C), 2022–2023.; Commander, U.S. Fleet Cyber Command/Commander, U.S. Tenth Fleet/Commander, Navy Space Command/Commander, Joint Force Headquarters – Cyber (Navy) (COMFCC/COMTENTHFLT/COMNAVSPACECOM/CDRJFHQ-C), 2023–present.	3	1989 (NROTC)	33	(1967– )
25	Frank M. Bradley		10 Aug 2022	Commander, Joint Special Operations Command/Commander, Joint Special Operations Command Forward, U.S. Special Operations Command (CDRJSOC/CDRJSOC-F), 2022–2025.	3	1991 (USNA)	31	(c. 1970– ) Navy SEAL. Promoted to admiral, 3 Oct 2025.
26	Thomas E. Ishee		15 Sep 2022	Commander, U.S. Sixth Fleet/Commander, Task Force Six/Commander, Naval Striking and Support Forces NATO/Deputy Commander, U.S. Naval Forces Europe-Africa/Joint Force Maritime Component Commander Europe (COMSIXTHFLT/CTF-6/COMSTRIKFORNATO/DCOMCNE-CNA/JFMCC Europe), 2022–2024.	2	1988 (OCS)	34	(1965– )
27	Richard A. Correll		1 Dec 2022	Deputy Commander, U.S. Strategic Command (DCDRUSSTRATCOM), 2022–2025.	3	1986 (NROTC)	36	(1964– ) Promoted to admiral, 5 Dec 2025.
28	John F.G. Wade		1 Dec 2022	Commander, Joint Task Force - Red Hill (CDRJTF-RH), 2022–2024.; Commander, U.S. Third Fleet (COMTHIRDFLT), 2024–2026.; Senior Military Assistant to the Secretary of Defense, 2026-present.	3	1990 (USNA)	32	(1968– )
*	Alvin Holsey		1 Feb 2023	Military Deputy Commander, U.S. Southern Command (MILDEPUSSOUTHCOM), 2023–2024.	1	1988 (NROTC)	35	(1965– ) Promoted to admiral, 7 Nov 2024.
29	James E. Pitts		5 Dec 2023	Deputy Chief of Naval Operations, Warfighting Requirements and Capabilities (DCNO N9), 2023–present.	2	1986 (USNA)	37	(1964– )
30	Jeffrey T. Jablon		5 Dec 2023	Deputy Chief of Naval Operations, Installations and Logistics (DCNO N4), 2023–present.	2	1987 (NROTC)	36	(1964– )
31	Blake L. Converse		5 Dec 2023	Deputy Commander, U.S. Pacific Fleet (DCOMPACFLT), 2021–present.	2	1987 (NROTC)	36	(1965– )
32	Shoshana S. Chatfield		13 Dec 2023	U.S. Military Representative, NATO Military Committee (USMILREP), 2023–2025.	2	1987 (NROTC)	36	(1965– ) Relieved, 2025. President, Naval War College, 2019–2023.
33	C. Scott Gray		18 Dec 2023	Commander, Navy Installations Command (CNIC), 2023–present.	2	1989 (AOCS)	34	(1964– )
34	Brendan R. McLane		21 Dec 2023	Commander, Naval Surface Forces/Commander, Naval Surface Force, U.S. Pacific Fleet (COMNAVSURFOR/COMNAVSURFPAC), 2023–2026.	2	1990 (USNA)	33	(1968– )
35	John B. Skillman		22 Dec 2023	Deputy Chief of Naval Operations, Integration of Capabilities and Resources (DCNO N8), 2023–present.	2	1986 (USNA)	37	(1964– )
36	Robert M. Gaucher		28 Dec 2023	Commander, Submarine Forces/Commander, Submarine Force Atlantic/Commander, Allied Submarine Command/Commander, Task Force 114/Commander, Task Force 88/Commander, Task Force 46 (COMSUBFOR/COMSUBLANT/COMASC/CTF-114/CTF-88/CTF-46), 2023–2026.; Submarine Direct Reporting Portfolio Manager, 2026-present.	2	1991 (USNA)	32	(c. 1966– )
37	James P. Downey		3 Jan 2024	Commander, Naval Sea Systems Command (COMNAVSEA), 2024–present.	1	1987 (NROTC)	37	(1964– )
38	Yvette M. Davids		11 Jan 2024	Superintendent, U.S. Naval Academy, 2024–2025.; Deputy Chief of Naval Operations, Operations, Plans, Strategy, and Warfighting Development (DCNO N3/N5/N7), 2025–present.	1	1989 (USNA)	35	(1967– ) Wife of Navy rear admiral Keith B. Davids.
39	John E. Gumbleton		12 Jan 2024	Deputy Commander, U.S. Fleet Forces Command/Deputy Commander, U.S. Naval Forces Northern Command/Deputy Commander, U.S. Naval Forces Strategic Command/Commander, Task Force 80 (DCOMUSFF/DCOMUSNAVNORTH/DCOMUSNAVSTRAT/CTF-80), 2024–present.; Commander, U.S. Fleet Forces Command (COMUSFF), 2025–present.	1	1989 (NROTC)	35	(1967– )
40	Douglas G. Perry		12 Jan 2024	Commander, U.S. Second Fleet/Commander, Joint Force Command - Norfolk/Director, Combined Joint Operations from the Sea Center of Excellence (COMSECONDFLT/CDRJFC-NF/DIRCJOS COE), 2024–present.	1	1989 (USNA)	35	(1967– )
41	Daniel L. Cheever		31 Jan 2024	Commander, Naval Air Forces/Commander, Naval Air Force, U.S. Pacific Fleet (COMNAVAIRFOR/COMNAVAIRPAC), 2024–2026.	1	1988 (AOCS)	36	(1963– )
42	George M. Wikoff		1 Feb 2024	Commander, U.S. Naval Forces Central Command/Commander, U.S. Fifth Fleet/Commander, Combined Maritime Forces (COMUSNAVCENT/COMFIFTHFLT/COMCMF), 2024–2025.	1	1990 (NROTC)	34	(1968– ) Promoted to admiral, 18 Nov 2025.
43	Frederick W. Kacher		15 Feb 2024	Commander, U.S. Seventh Fleet (COMSEVENTHFLT), 2024–2025.; Director, Joint Staff (DJS), 2025-present.	1	1990 (USNA)	34	(1968– )
44	Scott W. Pappano		3 Jul 2024	Principal Military Deputy to the Assistant Secretary of the Navy (Research, Development, and Acquisition) (PMD ASN(RDA)), 2024–2025.	1	1989 (USNA)	35	(c. 1967– )
45	Michael J. Vernazza		26 Jul 2024	Commander, Naval Information Forces (COMNAVIFOR), 2024–present.	1	1990 (USNA)	34	(c. 1968– )
46	Dion D. English		2 Aug 2024	Director, Logistics, Joint Staff, J4, 2024–present.	1	1993 (NROTC)	31	(c. 1971– )
47	Nancy S. Lacore		23 Aug 2024	Chief, U.S. Navy Reserve/Commander, Navy Reserve Force (CNR/CNRF), 2024–present.	1	1990 (NROTC)	34	
48	Christopher C. French		5 Sep 2024	Judge Advocate General, U.S. Navy/U.S. Department of Defense Representative for Ocean Policy Affairs (JAG/REPOPA), 2024–2025.	1	1992 (direct) (Note: Directly commissioned via the JAG Corps Student Program.)	32	Judge Advocate General's Corps.
49	Jeffrey T. Anderson		20 Sep 2024	Commander, U.S. Sixth Fleet/Commander, Task Force Six/Commander, Naval Striking and Support Forces NATO/Deputy Commander, U.S. Naval Forces Europe-Africa/Joint Force Maritime Component Commander Europe (COMSIXTHFLT/CTF-6/COMSTRIKFORNATO/DCOMCNE-CNA/JFMCC Europe), 2024–present.	1	1991 (USNA)	33	(c. 1969– )
50	Peter A. Garvin		11 Oct 2024	President, National Defense University (NDU-P), 2024–present.	1	1989 (USNA)	35	(c. 1967– ) President, Naval War College, 2023–2024.
51	Thomas M. Henderschedt		30 Jun 2025	Director, Intelligence, Joint Staff, J2, 2025–present.	0	1992 (NROTC)	33	
52	Jeffrey J. Czerewko		1 Aug 2025	Deputy Chief of Naval Operations, Personnel, Manpower and Training/Chief of Naval Personnel (DCNO N1/CNP), 2025–present.	0	1990 (USNA)	35	
53	John E. Dougherty IV		1 Aug 2025	Commander, Naval Air Systems Command (COMNAVAIR), 2025–present.	0	1995 (USNA)	30	
54	E. Seiko Okano		8 Aug 2025	Principal Military Deputy to the Assistant Secretary of the Navy (Research, Development, and Acquisition) (PMD ASN(RDA)), 2025-present.	0	1994 (USNA)	31	(c. 1972– )
55	Curt A. Renshaw		4 Oct 2025	Commander, U.S. Naval Forces Central Command/Commander, U.S. Fifth Fleet/Commander, Combined Maritime Forces (COMUSNAVCENT/COMFIFTHFLT/COMCMF), 2025–present.	0	1990 (USNA)	35	(1968– )
56	Heidi K. Berg		10 Oct 2025	Commander, U.S. Fleet Cyber Command/Commander, U.S. Tenth Fleet/Commander, Joint Force Headquarters – Cyber (Navy) (COMFCC/COMTENTHFLT/CDRJFHQ-C), 2025–present.	0	1991 (USNA)	34	
57	Patrick J. Hannifin		13 Nov 2025	Commander, U.S. Seventh Fleet, 2025–present.	0	1991 (NROTC)	34	
58	M. Wayne Baze		18 Nov 2025	Naval Inspector General (NAVIG), 2025–present.	0	1990 (NROTC)	35	
59	Stephen R. Tedford		11 Dec 2025	Director, Defense Contract Management Agency (DCMA), 2025–present.	0	1990 (NROTC)	35	
60	Douglas C. Verissimo		2 Feb 2026	Commander, Naval Air Forces/Commander, Naval Air Force, U.S. Pacific Fleet (COMNAVAIRFOR/COMNAVAIRPAC), 2026-present.	0	1987 (NROTC)	39	
61	Richard E. Seif Jr.		20 Feb 2026	Commander, Submarine Forces/Commander, Submarine Force Atlantic/Commander, Allied Submarine Command/Commander, Task Force 114/Commander, Task Force 88/Commander, Task Force 46 (COMSUBFOR/COMSUBLANT/COMASC/CTF-114/CTF-88/CTF-46), 2026–present.	0	1992 (USNA)	34	
62	Joseph F. Cahill		13 Jul 2026	Commander, Naval Surface Forces/Commander, Naval Surface Force, U.S. Pacific Fleet (COMNAVSURFOR/COMNAVSURFPAC), 2026–present.	0	1992 (NROTC)	34	
63	Marc J. Miguez		20 Jul 2026	Commander, U.S. Third Fleet (COMTHIRDFLT), 2026–present.	0	1993 (NROTC)	33	

== Background ==
=== Modern use of the rank ===
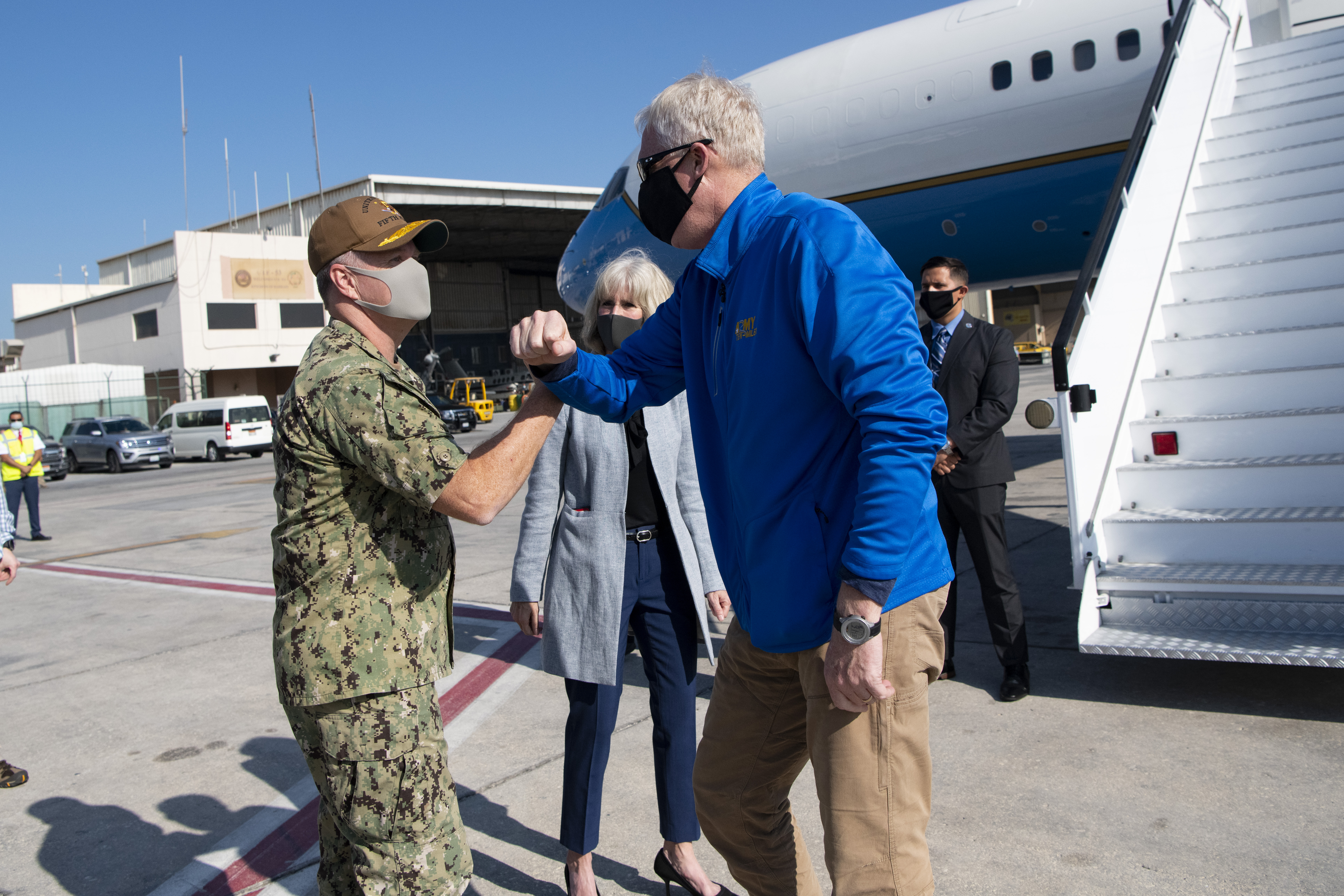
Vice Adm. Samuel Paparo greets Acting U.S. Secretary of Defense Christopher C. Miller in Manama, Bahrain on 25 November 2020.

Vice admirals in the United States Navy include commanders of numbered fleets (Note: only fleets subordinated to U.S. Fleet Forces Command, U.S. Naval Forces Central Command and the U.S. Pacific Fleet.) as well as high-level type commands and geographic commands, including the commanders of the naval submarine forces, naval surface forces, naval information forces and the chief of navy reserve. The superintendent of the United States Naval Academy has been a three-star vice admiral without interruption since John R. Ryan's tenure began in 1998.

As with any other service branch, vice admirals can hold joint assignments, of which there are 30 to 50 at any given time. Among the most prestigious of them is the director of the Joint Staff (DJS), principal staff advisor to the chairman of the Joint Chiefs of Staff and historically considered a stepping stone to four-star rank. All deputy commanders of the unified combatant commands are of three-star rank, (Note: The deputy commander of U.S. European Command was a four-star position until 2007, when it was reduced in rank to make way for the establishment of U.S. Africa Command, commanded by a four-star officer. The last four-star deputy commander of USEUCOM, General William E. Ward, also became the first commander of USAFRICOM.) as are directors of Defense Agencies not headed by a civilian such as the director of the Defense Intelligence Agency (DIRDIA). Internationally-based three-star positions include the United States military representative to the NATO Military Committee (USMILREP), the commander of Allied Joint Force Command – Norfolk (JFC-NF), and the security coordinator for Israel and the Palestinian National Authority. All nominees for three-star rank must be confirmed via majority by the Senate before the appointee can take office and thus assume the rank.

==== Statutory limits, elevations and reductions ====
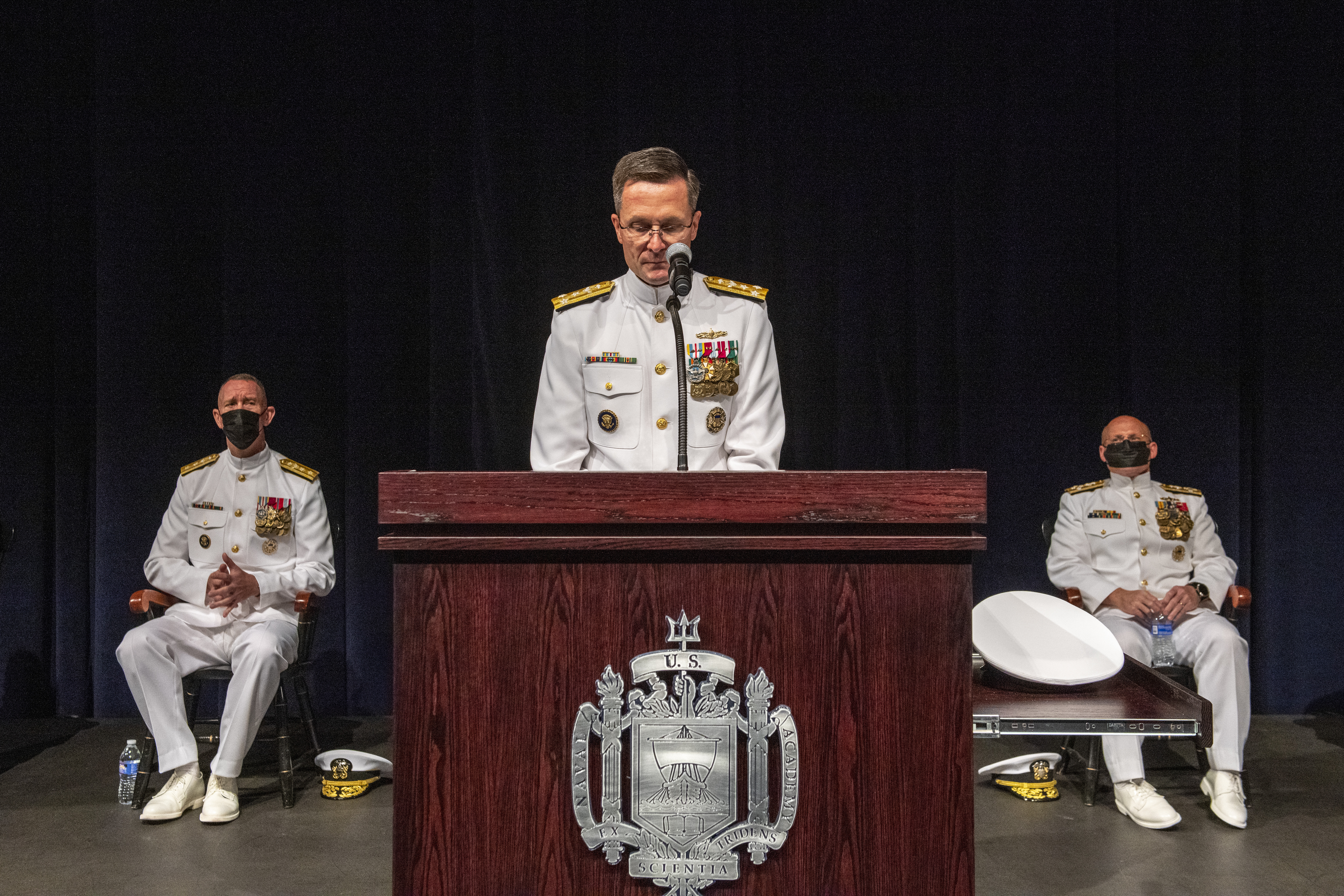
Vice Adm. Darse E. Crandall Jr. provides remarks after being sworn in as the 45th judge advocate general of the Navy on 18 August 2021.

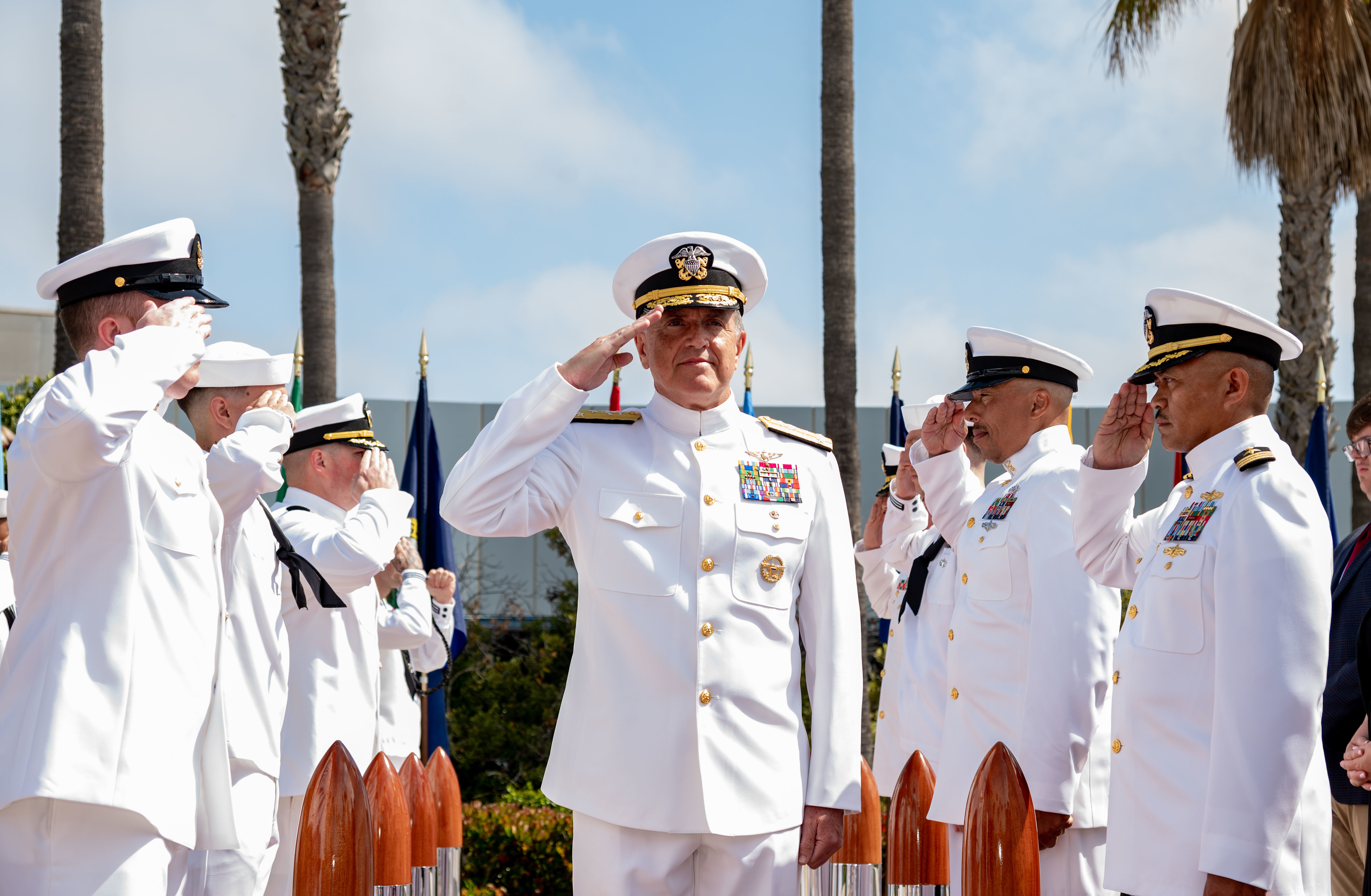
Vice Adm. Michael E. Boyle salutes sideboys during the change of command ceremony for U.S. Third Fleet on 16 June 2022.

The U.S. Code states that no more than 34 officers in the U.S. Navy may hold the rank of vice admiral on the active duty list, aside from those on joint duty assignments. Three-star positions can be elevated to four-star grade or reduced to two-star grade where deemed necessary, either to highlight their increasing importance (Note: 10 U.S.C. § 601 refers to positions held by four-star and three-star officers as "positions of importance and responsibility".) to the defense apparatus (or lack thereof) or to achieve parity with equivalent commands in other services or regions. Few three-star positions are set by statute, leading to their increased volatility as they do not require congressional approval to be downgraded.

- Rear Admiral Frank D. Whitworth II was promoted to vice admiral on 30 July 2021, making him the first director of intelligence of the Joint Staff to hold three-star rank. The elevation would remain in place after Whitworth's assignment as director of the National Geospatial-Intelligence Agency, with the role being taken over by Lieutenant General Dimitri Henry.
- Rear Admiral John F.G. Wade, commander of Joint Task Force Red Hill, was promoted to vice admiral on 1 December 2022. Under the commander of USINDOPACOM, Wade was charged with overseeing the defueling of the closing Red Hill Underground Fuel Storage Facility from 2022 to 2024.
- Lieutenant General Jeffrey A. Kruse was appointed the first advisor for military to the director of national intelligence in August 2021 as part of organizational changes to the ODNI. The role was created to serve as a "focal point" for the ODNI to communicate with the Department of Defense, including the under secretary of defense for intelligence and security, combat support agency directors and the combatant commands.

==== Senate confirmations ====
Military nominations are considered by the Senate Armed Services Committee. While it is rare for three-star or four-star nominations to face even token opposition in the Senate, nominations that do face opposition due to controversy surrounding the nominee in question are typically withdrawn. Nominations that are not withdrawn are allowed to expire without action at the end of the legislative session.

- For example, the nomination of Major General Ryan F. Gonsalves for promotion to lieutenant general and assignment as commanding general of U.S. Army Europe was withdrawn in November 2017 after an investigation was launched into the general's inappropriate comment to a female Congressional staffer. As a result, Gonsalves was administratively reprimanded and retired in May 2018.

Additionally, events that take place after Senate confirmation may still delay or even prevent the nominee from assuming office.

- For example, Major General John G. Rossi, who had been confirmed for promotion to lieutenant general and assignment as the commanding general of the U.S. Army Space and Missile Defense Command in April 2016 committed suicide two days before his scheduled promotion and assumption of command. As a result, the then incumbent commander of USASMDC, Lieutenant General David L. Mann, remained in command beyond customary term limits until another nominee, Major General James H. Dickinson was confirmed by the Senate.

== See also ==
- List of active duty United States four-star officers
- List of active duty United States three-star officers
- List of United States Navy vice admirals on active duty before 1960
- List of United States Navy vice admirals from 2000 to 2009
- List of United States Navy vice admirals from 2010 to 2019
- List of United States Coast Guard vice admirals
- List of United States Public Health Service Commissioned Corps vice admirals
- List of United States military leaders by rank
- List of United States Navy four-star admirals
- Vice admiral (United States)

== Bibliography ==
- United States Navy Flag Officers (Public), January 2021 (PDF), Washington, D.C.: MyNavyHR, January 2021, archived from the original (PDF) on 17 April 2021
- United States Navy Flag Officers (Public), March 2021 (PDF), Washington, D.C.: MyNavyHR, March 2021, archived from the original (PDF) on 18 May 2021
- United States Navy Flag Officers (Public), April 2021 (PDF), Washington, D.C.: MyNavyHR, April 2021, archived from the original (PDF) on 17 April 2021
- United States Navy Flag Officers (Public), May 2021 (PDF), Washington, D.C.: MyNavyHR, May 2021, archived from the original (PDF) on 18 May 2021
- United States Navy Flag Officers (Public), June 2021 (PDF), Washington, D.C.: MyNavyHR, June 2021, archived from the original (PDF) on 3 June 2021
- United States Navy Flag Officers (Public), July 2021 (PDF), Washington, D.C.: MyNavyHR, July 2021, archived from the original (PDF) on 9 July 2021
- United States Navy Flag Officers (Public), August 2021 (PDF), Washington, D.C.: MyNavyHR, August 2021, archived from the original (PDF) on 6 August 2021
- United States Navy Flag Officers (Public), September 2021 (PDF), Washington, D.C.: MyNavyHR, September 2021, archived from the original (PDF) on 1 September 2021
- United States Navy Flag Officers (Public), October 2021 (PDF), Washington, D.C.: MyNavyHR, October 2021, archived from the original (PDF) on 1 October 2021
- United States Navy Flag Officers (Public), November 2021 (PDF), Washington, D.C.: MyNavyHR, November 2021, archived from the original (PDF) on 2 November 2021
- United States Navy Flag Officers (Public), January 2022 (PDF), Washington, D.C.: MyNavyHR, January 2022, archived from the original (PDF) on 4 July 2022
- United States Navy Flag Officers (Public), February 2022 (PDF), Washington, D.C.: MyNavyHR, February 2022, archived from the original (PDF) on 4 February 2022
- United States Navy Flag Officers (Public), March 2022 (PDF), Washington, D.C.: MyNavyHR, March 2022, archived from the original (PDF) on 2 March 2022
- United States Navy Flag Officers (Public), April 2022 (PDF), Washington, D.C.: MyNavyHR, April 2022, archived from the original (PDF) on 2 April 2022
- United States Navy Flag Officers (Public), May 2022 (PDF), Washington, D.C.: MyNavyHR, May 2022, archived from the original (PDF) on 30 April 2022
- United States Navy Flag Officers (Public), June 2022 (PDF), Washington, D.C.: MyNavyHR, June 2022, archived from the original (PDF) on 1 June 2022
- United States Navy Flag Officers (Public), July 2022 (PDF), Washington, D.C.: MyNavyHR, July 2022, archived from the original (PDF) on 5 July 2022
- United States Navy Flag Officers (Public), August 2022 (PDF), Washington, D.C.: MyNavyHR, August 2022, archived from the original (PDF) on 2 August 2022
- United States Navy Flag Officers (Public), September 2022 (PDF), Washington, D.C.: MyNavyHR, September 2022, archived from the original (PDF) on 2 September 2022
- United States Navy Flag Officers (Public), October 2022 (PDF), Washington, D.C.: MyNavyHR, October 2022, archived from the original (PDF) on 27 October 2022
- United States Navy Flag Officers (Public), November 2022 (PDF), Washington, D.C.: MyNavyHR, November 2022, archived from the original (PDF) on 2 November 2022
- United States Navy Flag Officers (Public), December 2022 (PDF), Washington, D.C.: MyNavyHR, December 2022, archived from the original (PDF) on 2 December 2022
- United States Navy Flag Officers (Public), January 2023 (PDF), Washington, D.C.: MyNavyHR, January 2023, archived from the original (PDF) on 5 January 2023
- United States Navy Flag Officers (Public), February 2023 (PDF), Washington, D.C.: MyNavyHR, February 2023, archived from the original (PDF) on 2 February 2023
- United States Navy Flag Officers (Public), March 2023 (PDF), Washington, D.C.: MyNavyHR, March 2023, archived from the original (PDF) on 2 March 2023
- United States Navy Flag Officers (Public), April 2023 (PDF), Washington, D.C.: MyNavyHR, April 2023, archived from the original (PDF) on 6 April 2023
- United States Navy Flag Officers (Public), May 2023 (PDF), Washington, D.C.: MyNavyHR, May 2023, archived from the original (PDF) on 2 May 2023
- United States Navy Flag Officers (Public), January 2024 (PDF), Washington, D.C.: MyNavyHR, January 2024, archived from the original (PDF) on 9 January 2024
- United States Navy Flag Officers (Public), February 2024 (PDF), Washington, D.C.: MyNavyHR, February 2024, archived from the original (PDF) on 6 February 2024
- United States Navy Flag Officers (Public), March 2024 (PDF), Washington, D.C.: MyNavyHR, March 2024, archived from the original (PDF) on 2 March 2024
- United States Navy Flag Officers (Public), July 2024 (PDF), Washington, D.C.: MyNavyHR, July 2024, archived from the original (PDF) on 5 July 2024
- United States Navy Flag Officers (Public), August 2024 (PDF), Washington, D.C.: MyNavyHR, August 2024, archived from the original (PDF) on 2 August 2024
- United States Navy Flag Officers (Public), September 2024 (PDF), Washington, D.C.: MyNavyHR, September 2024, archived from the original (PDF) on 5 September 2024
- United States Navy Flag Officers (Public), October 2024 (PDF), Washington, D.C.: MyNavyHR, October 2024, archived from the original (PDF) on 2 October 2024
- United States Navy Flag Officers (Public), July 2025 (PDF), Washington, D.C.: MyNavyHR, July 2025, archived from the original (PDF) on 2 July 2025
