= James W. Crawford III =

43rd Judge Advocate General of the Navy

Vice Admiral James W. Crawford III
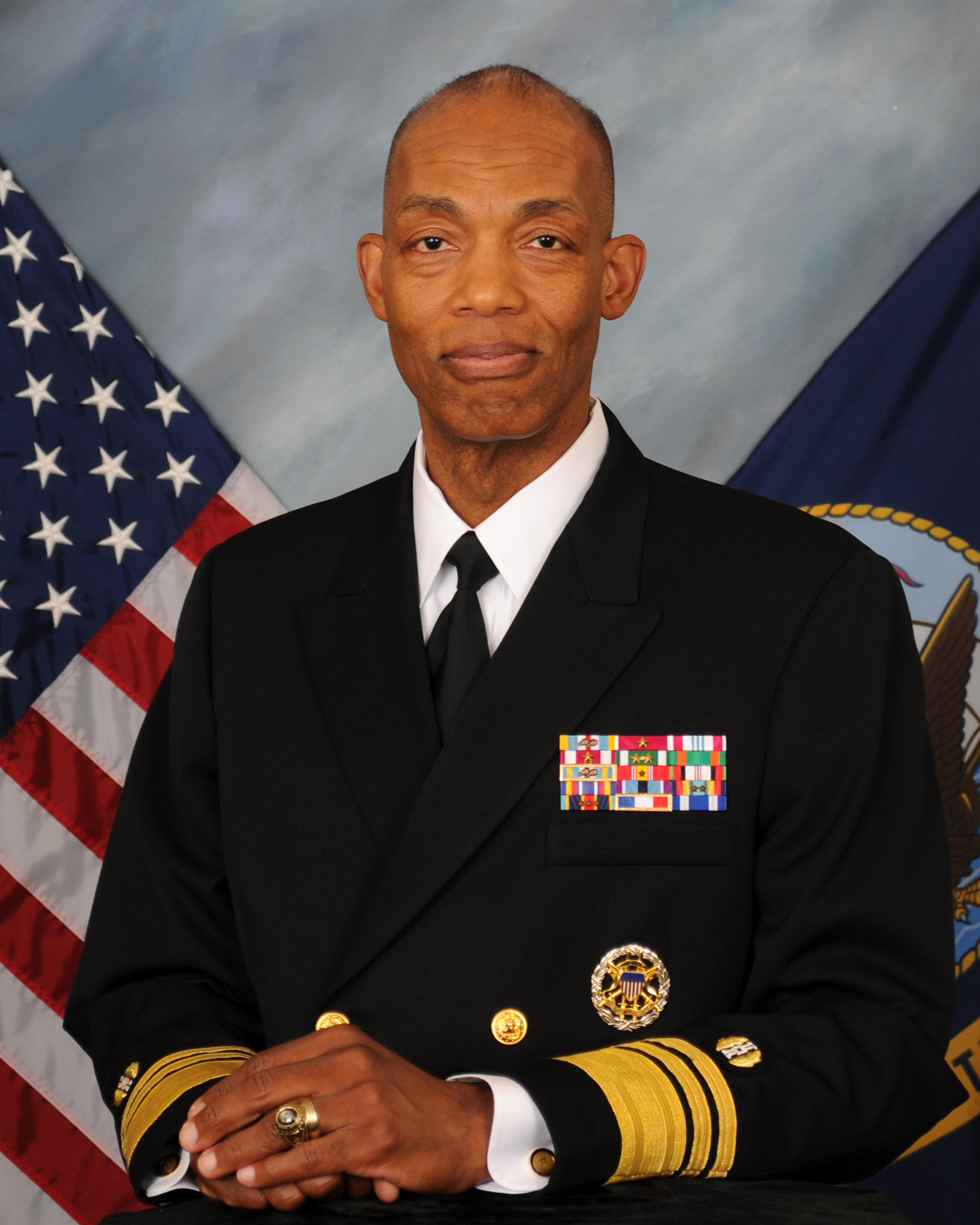

14th President of Texas Southern University
- Incumbent
- Assumed office June 1, 2024
- Preceded by: Lesia L. Crumpton-Young; Mary Evans Sias (interim)

6th President of Felician University
- In office September 29, 2020 – April 5, 2023
- Preceded by: Anne Prisco
- Succeeded by: Mildred Mihlon

Personal details
- Born: James Walter Crawford III; November 28, 1957 (age 68) Charlotte, North Carolina, U.S.
- Spouse: Elizabeth Crawford
- Children: 2
- Education: Belmont Abbey College (BA); University of North Carolina (JD); University of Miami (LLM); Naval War College (MA)
- Awards: Navy Distinguished Service Medal; Defense Superior Service Medal (x3); Legion of Merit (x3); Defense Meritorious Service Medal; Meritorious Service Medal (x2); Navy and Marine Corps Commendation Medal (x3); Navy and Marine Corps Achievement Medal

Military service
- Allegiance: United States of America
- Branch/service: United States Navy
- Years of service: 1983–2018
- Rank: Vice admiral
- Commands: Judge Advocate General of the Navy; Deputy Judge Advocate General of the Navy

James Walter Crawford III (born November 28, 1957) is an American university administrator and former United States Navy officer who is the president of Texas Southern University. He served in the Navy for 34 years and is the former president of Felician University, having left the role in April 2023.

He served as the 43rd Judge Advocate General (JAG) of the United States Navy from June 26, 2015, to September 12, 2018.

== Early life and education ==
Crawford III was born in Charlotte, North Carolina, on November 28, 1957, to James W. Crawford II and his wife. The younger Crawford would go on to be educated in Catholic schools, first by the Oblate Sisters of Providence and the Sisters of Mercy. He graduated from Belmont Abbey College in 1979 with a bachelor's degree in political science.

== Career ==
=== Military ===
He was commissioned through the Judge Advocate General (JAG) Corps Student Program and in 1983 earned a Juris Doctor degree from the University of North Carolina School of Law at Chapel Hill. He later earned a Master of Laws in Ocean and Coastal Law from the University of Miami School of Law and a Master of Arts in National Security and Strategic Studies from the Naval War College.

Crawford served from 2012 to 2015 as the deputy judge advocate general of the Navy and commander, Naval Legal Service Command. As commander, Naval Legal Service Command, he led the judge advocates, enlisted legalmen, and civilian employees of 14 commands worldwide, providing prosecution and defense services, legal assistance services to individuals and legal support to shore and afloat commands.

Crawford served from 2007 to 2011 as legal counsel to the chairman, Joint Chiefs of Staff. From 2011 to 2012, he served as commander, NATO Rule of Law Field Support Mission/Rule of Law Field Force-Afghanistan.

Before his appointment to flag rank, he served as special counsel to the chief of naval operations, the senior staff judge advocate for the commander, U.S. Pacific Command and as the fleet judge advocate for U.S. 7th Fleet. In command, he served as commanding officer, Region Legal Service Office Southeast.

Crawford also served at Navy Personnel Command; the Office of the Legal Counsel to the chairman of the Joint Chiefs of Staff; the Naval War College; commander, U.S. Naval Forces Europe; the Naval Justice School and Cruiser-Destroyer Group 8. He began his legal career as a defense counsel at the Naval Legal Service Trial Defense Activity, Naval Air Station Jacksonville.

Crawford was the 43rd Judge Advocate General of the Navy. Crawford was the principal military legal counsel to the Secretary of the Navy and Chief of Naval Operations and serves as the Department of Defense representative for ocean policy affairs (REPOPA). He led 2,300 attorneys, enlisted legalmen, and civilian employees of the worldwide Navy JAG Corps community.

Crawford is a member of the state bar of North Carolina. His personal decorations include the Distinguished Service Medal, the Defense Superior Service Medal (three awards), the Legion of Merit (three awards), the Defense Meritorious Service Medal, the Meritorious Service Medal (two awards), the Navy and Marine Corps Commendation Medal (three awards) and the Navy and Marine Corps Achievement Medal.

Crawford's long career ended under a cloud. Less than two months prior to his retirement, the Navy Times reported on a ruling from the Court of Appeals for the Armed Forces that he had illegally influenced the prosecution of Senior Chief Special Warfare Operator Keith E. Barry (on charges of rape of a girlfriend). Barry's conviction was overturned on that appeal and dismissed with prejudice.

The Court of Appeals for the Armed Forces found Crawford's involvement constituted "unlawful influence." In reaching this conclusion, the court applied Article 37 of the Uniform Code of Military Justice, which at the time of his conduct prohibited judge advocates (and others subject to the code) from "unlawfully influencing action of court." (UCI) The appellate attorney for the exonerated Barry urged that the Navy not allow for Crawford's upcoming retirement, but instead to place him on legal hold and go forward with a prosecution of Crawford for this charge of UCI. Defense attorneys in other cases have alleged similar improper influence by Crawford.

According to his official Navy biography, Crawford retired on November 1, 2018. There is no mention within his official biography of this appellate finding of UCI on his part.

=== Academia ===
Crawford became the president of Felician University in New Jersey in 2020 during the COVID-19 pandemic. He served in the role until April 2023, when he stepped down. He was named the sole finalist for the presidency of Texas Southern University in April 2024, and became president June 1, 2024.

== Personal life ==
Crawford is Catholic, and attended Nativity Church in Burke, Virginia, before assuming presidency at Felician University and currently serves as the President of Texas Southern University.

Military offices
Preceded by Nanette M. DeRenzi	43rd Judge Advocate General of the Navy; 2015 – 2018	Succeeded by John G. Hannink
