= Bruce E. MacDonald =

40th Judge Advocate General of the Navy

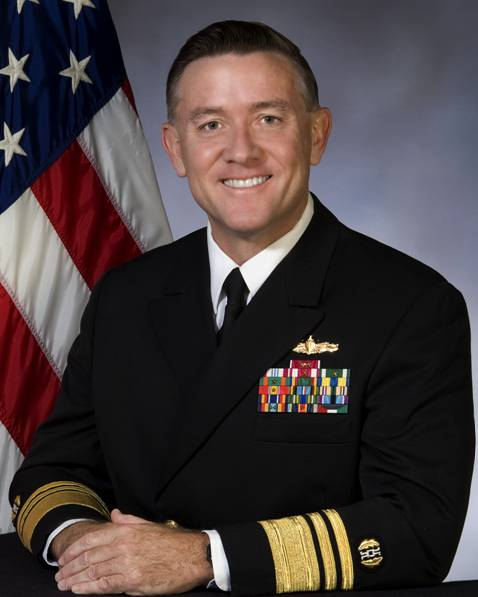
- Vice Admiral Bruce E. MacDonald
- Born: 1955 (age 70–71); Cincinnati, Ohio, U.S.
- Education: College of the Holy Cross (BA); California Western School of Law (JD); Harvard University (LLM)
- Military career
- Allegiance: United States of America
- Branch: United States Navy
- Service years: 1978–2009
- Rank: Vice Admiral
- Unit: Judge Advocate General's Corps, U.S. Navy
- Commands: Judge Advocate General of the Navy; Deputy Judge Advocate General of the Navy; Naval Legal Service Command; Naval Legal Service Office Northwest; Trial Service Office West Detachment
- Conflicts: Gulf War
- Awards: Navy Distinguished Service Medal; Legion of Merit (3)

Bruce Edward MacDonald (born 1955) is a retired United States Navy vice admiral who last served as the 40th Judge Advocate General of the Navy from July 2006 to August 2009. Prior to that, MacDonald served as Deputy Judge Advocate General of the Navy from November 2004 to July 2006.

On July 2, 2008, then Rear Admiral MacDonald was nominated for appointment to the grade of vice admiral while serving as the Navy's Judge Advocate General. He was confirmed by the Senate on August 1, 2008 and was promoted to grade on August 4, 2008 becoming the first JAG to be a three-star flag officer.

== Naval career ==
Vice Admiral MacDonald graduated from the College of the Holy Cross in 1978 with a Bachelor of Arts degree in English, and entered the Navy in May of that year.

VADM MacDonald was commissioned an ensign in the unrestricted line through the Naval Reserve Officer Training Corps. Following the normal Surface Warfare pipeline, he reported to the USS Hepburn (FF 1055) in October 1979 where he served as Main Propulsion Assistant and Navigator.

After a two-year tour at Fleet Combat Training Center, Pacific where he served as Intermediate Combat Systems Team Training and Advanced Multi-Threat Team Training course director, he was selected for the Law Education Program in 1984. He received his degree of Juris Doctor from California Western School of Law in 1987.

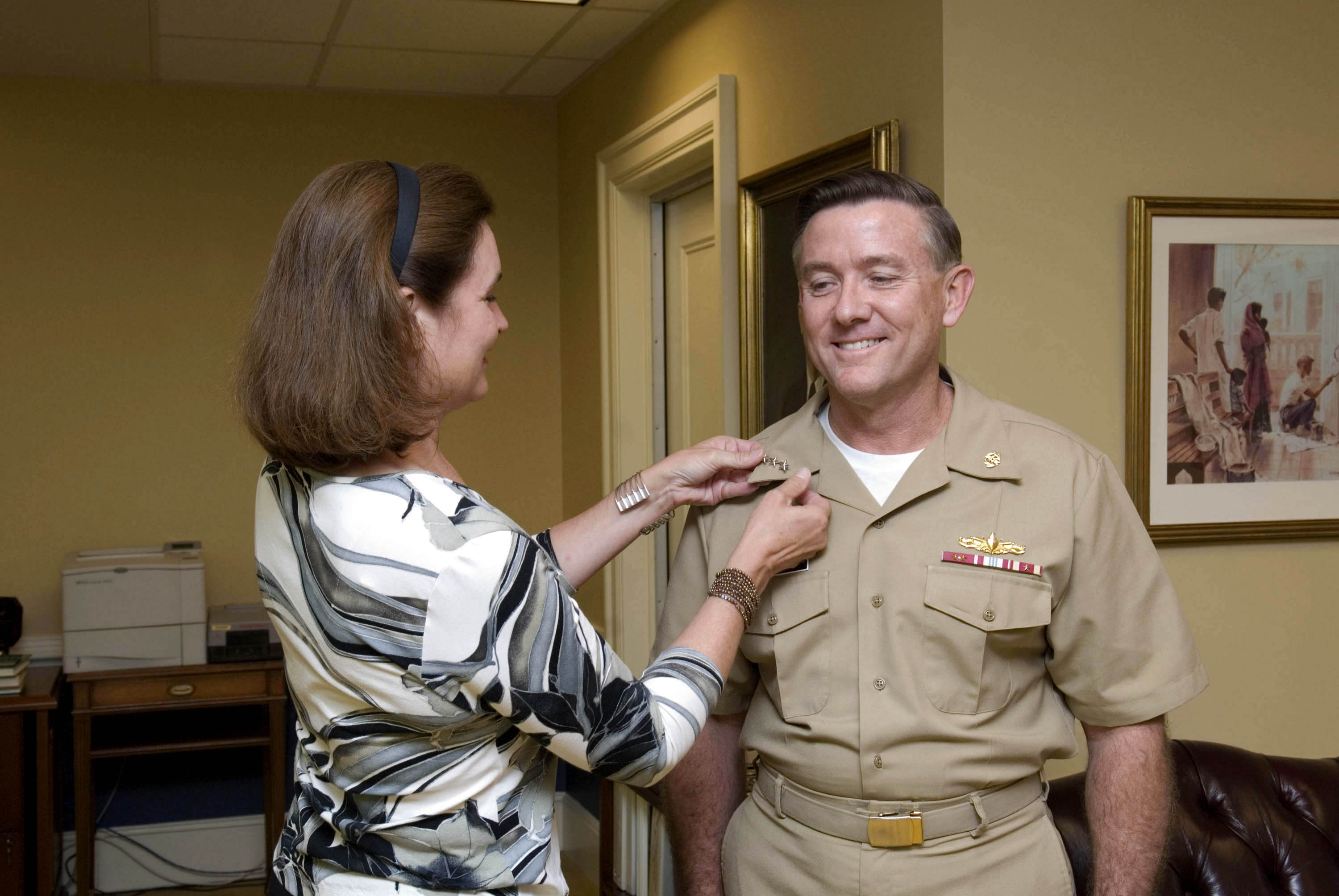
Vice Adm. Judge Advocate General (JAG) Bruce MacDonald is pinned by his wife, Karen, during a promotion ceremony at the Pentagon.

In 1987, VADM MacDonald reported to Naval Legal Service Office San Diego where he served as Senior Defense Counsel, Trial Counsel, and Medical Care Recovery Act Claims Officer. In 1990, he reported aboard USS Independence (CV 62) as the Command Judge Advocate. After receiving a Master of Laws degree from Harvard Law School in Cambridge, Massachusetts, in 1992, he was transferred to Seoul, Korea, where he served as Chief, Operational Law Division, on the staffs of United Nations Command, Combined Forces Command, and United States Forces Korea. He also served as Staff Judge Advocate on the staff of United States Naval Forces Korea.

In August 1994, VADM MacDonald reported aboard Naval Legal Service Office Northwest as its Executive Officer. In November 1996, he became the Officer in Charge of Trial Service Office West Detachment Bremerton, Wash. In July 1997, he reported to Commander Seventh Fleet in Yokosuka, Japan as the Fleet Judge Advocate. VADM MacDonald assumed command of Naval Legal Service Office Northwest in August 1999, serving as commanding officer until June 2002. He was assigned to The Pentagon as the Special Counsel to the Chief of Naval Operations from June 2002 through October 2004. In November 2004, VADM MacDonald became the Deputy Judge Advocate General and Commander, Naval Legal Service Command. In July 2006, VADM MacDonald assumed his position as Judge Advocate General of the Navy. He retired from the Navy in 2009.

== Post-Naval career ==
In 2010, MacDonald was appointed the Convening Authority for the Office of Military Commissions, replacing Susan J. Crawford. On March 24, 2010, Newsweek reported that MacDonald had helped draft the Military Commissions Act of 2009.

Carol Rosenberg, of the Miami Herald, reports that MacDonald had testified before the United States Congress on numerous occasions, defending the Guantanamo Military Commission system.

MacDonald testified on February 13, 2013, at the military commission of Khalid Sheikh Mohammed, and the four men accused of being his co-conspirators. Defense attorneys had argued that MacDonald had improperly approved death sentences prior to their clients being provided with informed legal advice. According to Jane Sutton, reporting from Guantanamo, MacDonald and Commander Walter Ruiz had a "shouting match".

Sutton reported that MacDonald's term as convening authority was scheduled to end in March 2013.

== Awards and decorations ==
Navy Distinguished Service Medal
Legion of Merit (3 Award Stars)
Defense Meritorious Service Medal
Meritorious Service Medal (1 Award Star)
Navy and Marine Corps Commendation Medal (1 Award Star)
Navy and Marine Corps Achievement Medal (1 Award Star)
Navy Unit Commendation
Navy Expeditionary Medal
National Defense Service Medal (1 Service Star)
Armed Forces Expeditionary Medal
Southwest Asia Service Medal
Global War on Terrorism Service Medal
Korea Defense Service Medal
Humanitarian Service Medal
Sea Service Deployment Ribbon (2 Service Stars)
Overseas Service Ribbon (1 Service Star)
Kuwait Liberation Medal (Kuwait)

== See also ==
- Director of Operations, Planning and Development for Military Commissions

== Sources ==
This article incorporates text in the public domain from the United States Navy.

- https://web.archive.org/web/20070730075233/http://www.jag.navy.mil/AboutUs/RADMMacdonald.doc
- navy.mil

Military offices
Preceded by James E. McPherson	40th Judge Advocate General of the Navy; 2006–2009	Succeeded by James W. Houck
