= Christopher French (admiral) =

U.S. Navy admiral

Christopher C. French
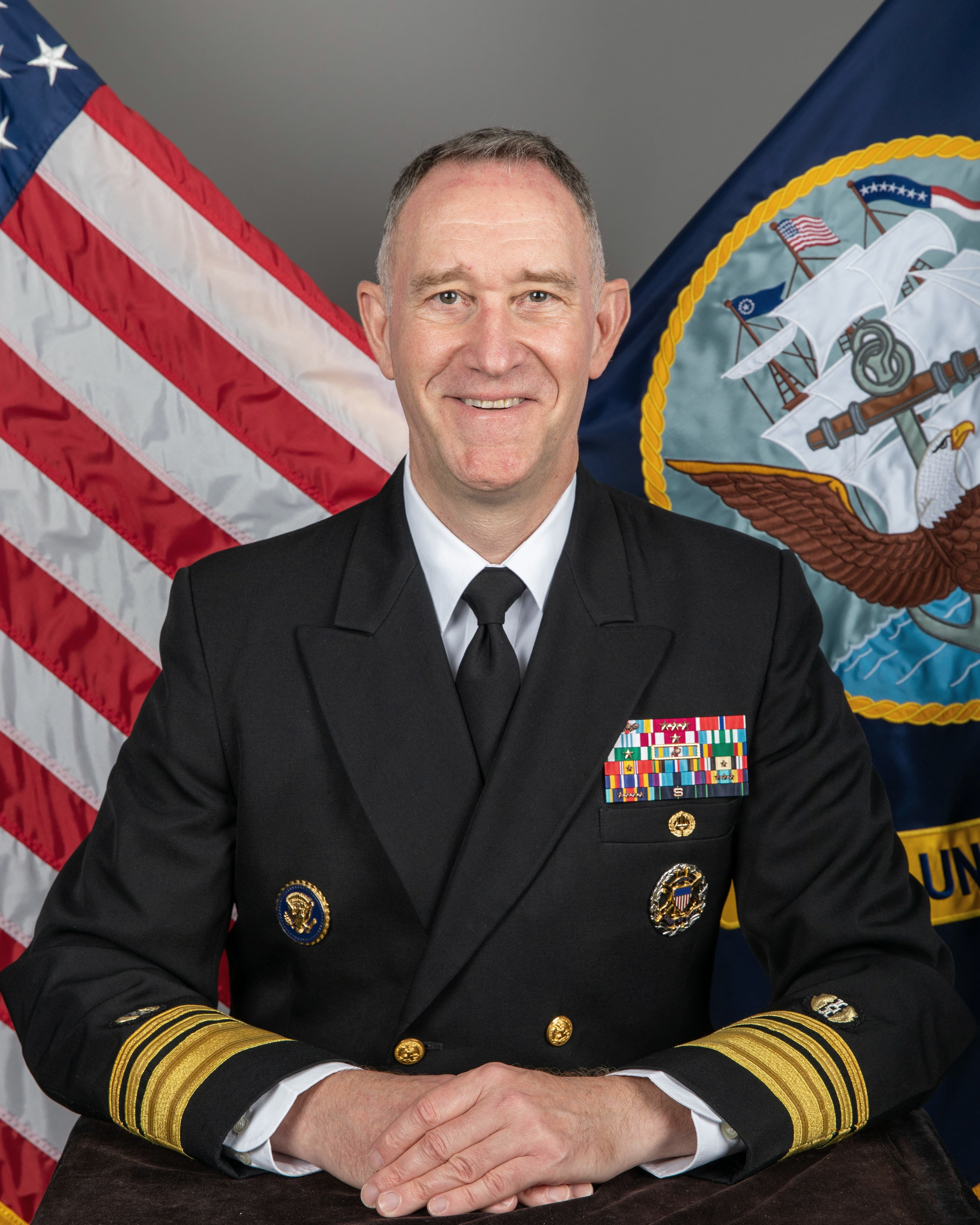
- Official portrait, 2024
- Born: Albany, New York, U.S.
- Education: University of New Hampshire (BA); Villanova University JD); Georgetown University Law Center (LLM)
- Military career
- Branch: United States Navy
- Service years: 1992–2025
- Rank: Vice Admiral (Retired as Rear Admiral)
- Unit: Judge Advocate General's Corps, U.S. Navy
- Commands: Judge Advocate General of the Navy; Deputy Judge Advocate General of the Navy; Legal Counsel to the Chairman of the Joint Chiefs of Staff; U.S. Region Legal Service Office, Europe, Africa, and Southwest Asia
- Awards: Defense Superior Service Medal (4); Legion of Merit (3); Bronze Star Medal

Christopher C. French is a retired United States Navy rear admiral who last served as the 46th Judge Advocate General of the Navy from September 5, 2024, to January 1, 2025. He served as the Deputy Judge Advocate General of the Navy from 2021 to 2024. A career judge advocate, French was commissioned into the Navy via the JAG Corps Student Program in 1992, graduating from the University of New Hampshire in 1990, the Villanova University School of Law in 1993 and from the Georgetown University Law Center with an L.L.M. degree in 2004.

== Early life and education ==
French was born in Albany, New York. He graduated from the University of New Hampshire in 1990. French was commissioned through the Judge Advocate General's Corps Student Program in 1992, graduating in 1993 from the Villanova University School of Law. He later earned a Master of Laws from Georgetown University Law Center in 2004.

== Naval and JAG Career ==
At sea, French served as the fleet judge advocate to Commander, U.S. Seventh Fleet; staff judge advocate to Commander, Carrier Strike Group FIVE; and legal officer, aboard USS Nimitz (CVN-68).

His other assignments include legal counsel, Chairman of the Joint Chiefs of Staff; staff judge advocate, U.S. European Command; deputy legal advisor to the U.S. National Security Council; special counsel to the Chief of Naval Operations; commanding officer, U.S. Region Legal Service Office, Europe, Africa, and Southwest Asia; chief of Operational Law, Multi-National Forces, Iraq; deputy legal counsel, Office of the Legal Counsel to the Chairman of the Joint Chiefs of Staff; assistant force judge advocate, Commander, U.S. Naval Forces, Europe; staff judge advocate, Naval Special Warfare Development Group. French began his legal career first as a trial counsel and later as the senior defense counsel at Naval Legal Service Office, Middle Pacific, Pearl Harbor, Hawaii.

He was promoted to rear admiral (lower half) on 31 July 2018, and rear admiral on 1 August 2021.

In May 2024, French was nominated for promotion to vice admiral and assignment as Judge Advocate General of the Navy. He was promoted and assumed office in September 2024. In December 2024, French submitted for voluntary retirement in the rank of rear admiral, only three months after assuming office; his retirement took effect on January 1, 2025.

== Awards and decorations ==

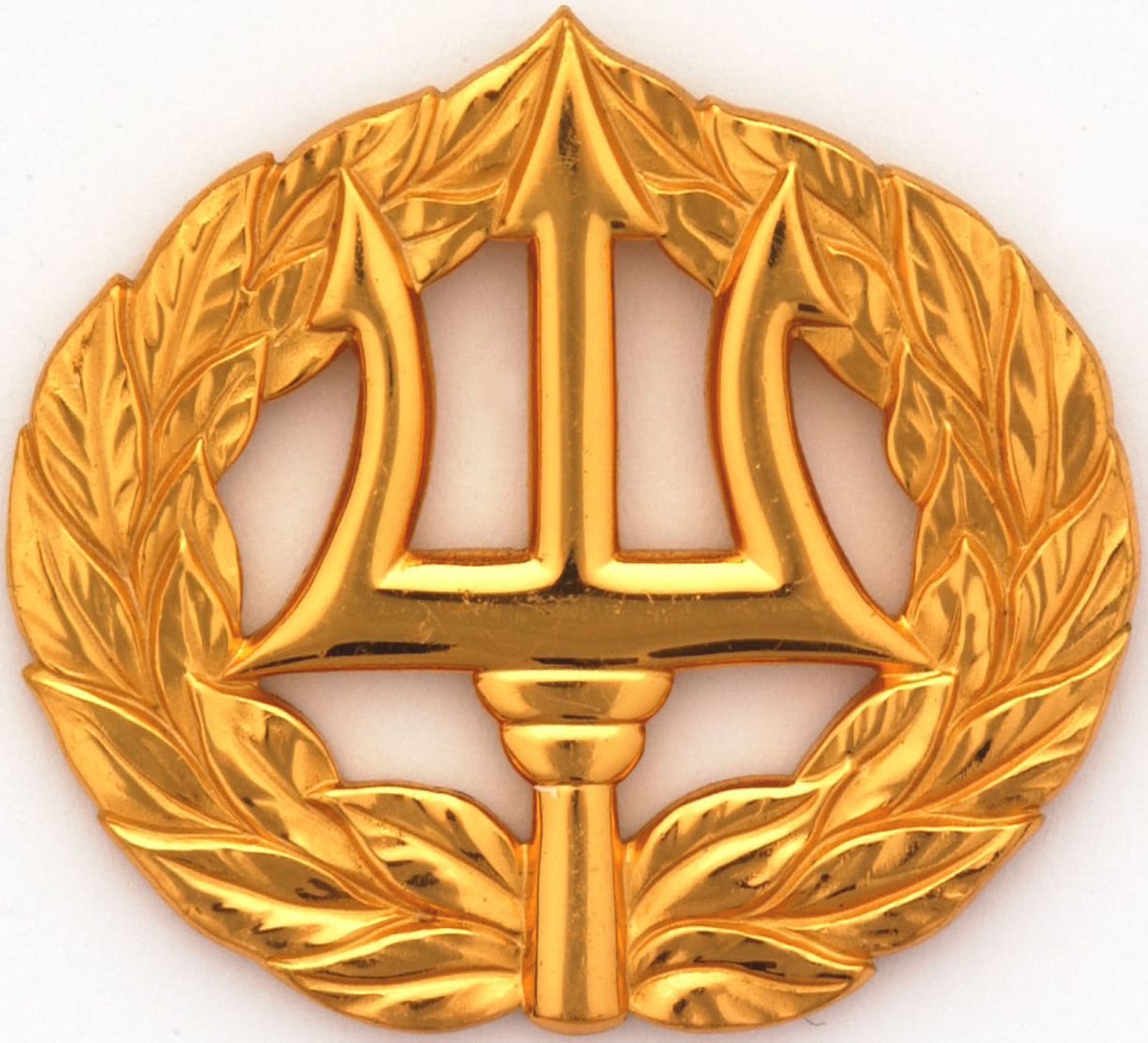

Defense Superior Service Medal with three bronze oak leaf clusters		Legion of Merit with two gold award stars
Bronze Star	Defense Meritorious Service Medal	Meritorious Service Medal with gold award star
Joint Service Commendation Medal	Navy and Marine Corps Commendation Medal with gold award star	Joint Meritorious Unit Award with bronze oak leaf cluster
Navy Unit Commendation with bronze service star	National Defense Service Medal with bronze service star	Armed Forces Expeditionary Medal
Iraq Campaign Medal with bronze service star	Global War on Terrorism Service Medal	Navy and Marine Corps Sea Service Deployment Ribbon with three bronze service star
Navy and Marine Corps Overseas Service Ribbon with three bronze service stars	Navy Rifle Marksmanship Ribbon	Navy Pistol Marksmanship Ribbon
Command Ashore insignia
Office of the Joint Chiefs of Staff Identification Badge
Presidential Service Badge

== Effective dates of promotions ==
Insignia	Rank	Date
	Ensign	N/A
	Lieutenant (junior grade)	N/A
	Lieutenant	N/A
	Lieutenant commander	N/A
	Commander	N/A
	Captain	N/A
	Rear admiral (lower half)	31 July 2018
	Rear Admiral	1 August 2021
	Vice Admiral	5 September 2024

Military offices
Preceded by ???	Legal Counsel to the Chairman of the Joint Chiefs of Staff; 2018–2021	Succeeded by Robert A. Borcherding
Preceded by Darse E. Crandall Jr.	Deputy Judge Advocate General of the Navy; 2021–2024	Succeeded by Lia M. Reynolds
Preceded by Darse E. Crandall Jr.	Judge Advocate General of the Navy; 2024–2025	Succeeded by Lia M. Reynolds; Acting
