= Darse Crandall =

U.S. Navy admiral

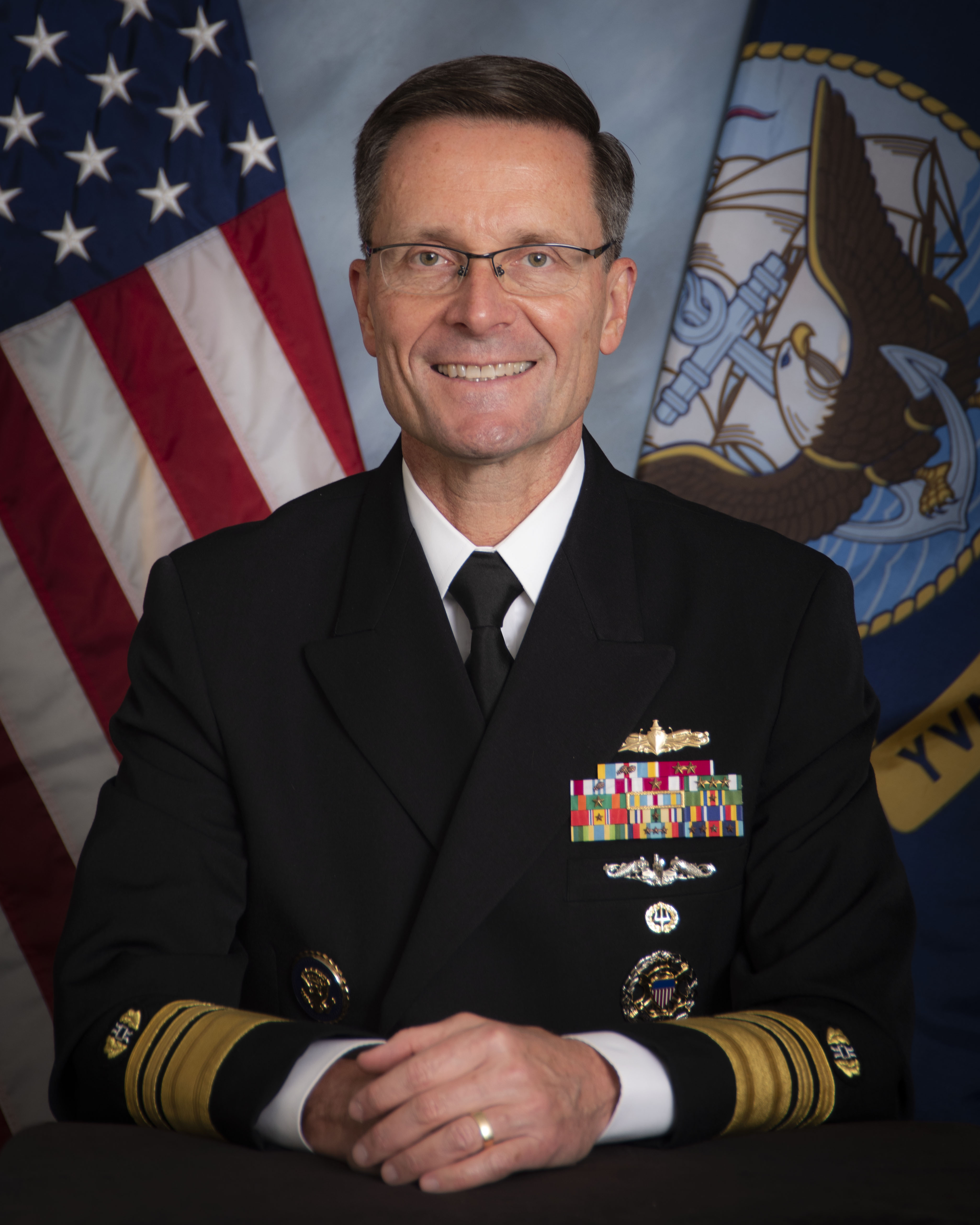
- Official portrait, 2021
- Born: 1962 (age 63–64)
- Education: Northwestern University (BA); Georgetown University (JD); George Washington University (LLM)
- Relatives: Vice Adm. Frank D. Whitworth (brother-in-law)
- Military career
- Allegiance: United States
- Branch: United States Navy
- Service years: 1984–2024
- Rank: Vice Admiral
- Nickname: Del
- Unit: Judge Advocate General's Corps, U.S. Navy
- Commands: Judge Advocate General of the Navy; Deputy Judge Advocate General of the Navy; Naval Legal Service Command
- Awards: Navy Distinguished Service Medal; Defense Superior Service Medal (3); Legion of Merit (3)

Darse Earle "Del" Crandall Jr. (born 1962) is a retired United States Navy vice admiral who is the dean of the University of North Dakota School of Law. Crandall previously served as the 45th Judge Advocate General of the Navy from 2021 to 2024, and as the Deputy Judge Advocate General of the Navy and Commander of the Naval Legal Service Command from 2018 to 2021.

== Early life and education ==
Raised in Elgin, Illinois, Crandall earned a B.A. degree in economics from Northwestern University in 1984. He served aboard USS Woodrow Wilson (SSBN-624) and USS Lockwood (FF-1064) before being selected for the Funded Legal Education Program (FLEP). Crandall received his J.D. degree from the Georgetown University Law Center in 1992 and his LL.M. degree in international law from George Washington University in 1999.

== Personal life ==
Crandall is the son of Darse Earle Crandall Sr., who was a Navy Supply Corps officer. His younger sister Amy Beth Crandall is married to fellow Navy admiral Frank D. Whitworth.

Crandall married Barbara A. Puckett on December 20, 1986 in Lucas County, Ohio. They have three adult sons.

Crandall was named dean of the University of North Dakota School of Law on April 23, 2026 and began work in the role on July 1 of the same year.

== Conspiracy theories ==
Crandall has been the subject of frequent QAnon-aligned conspiracy theories, generally published by the "Real Raw News" website, insinuating he is, in his role as Judge Advocate General, in charge of a secret military court trying and executing "Deep State" officials for supposed crimes.

== Awards and decorations ==

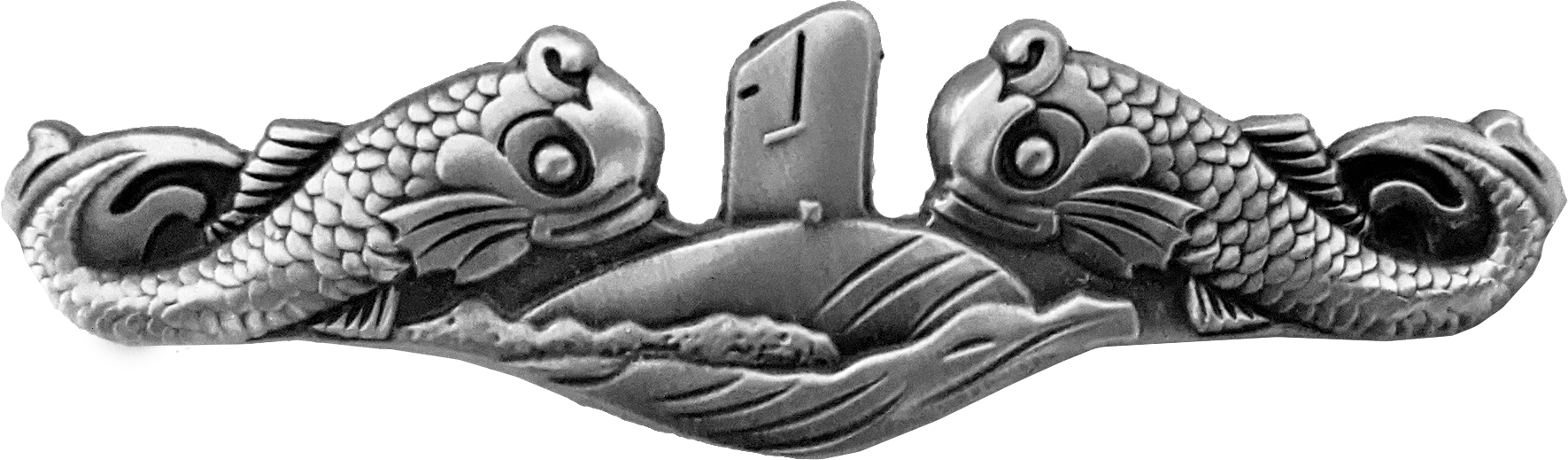

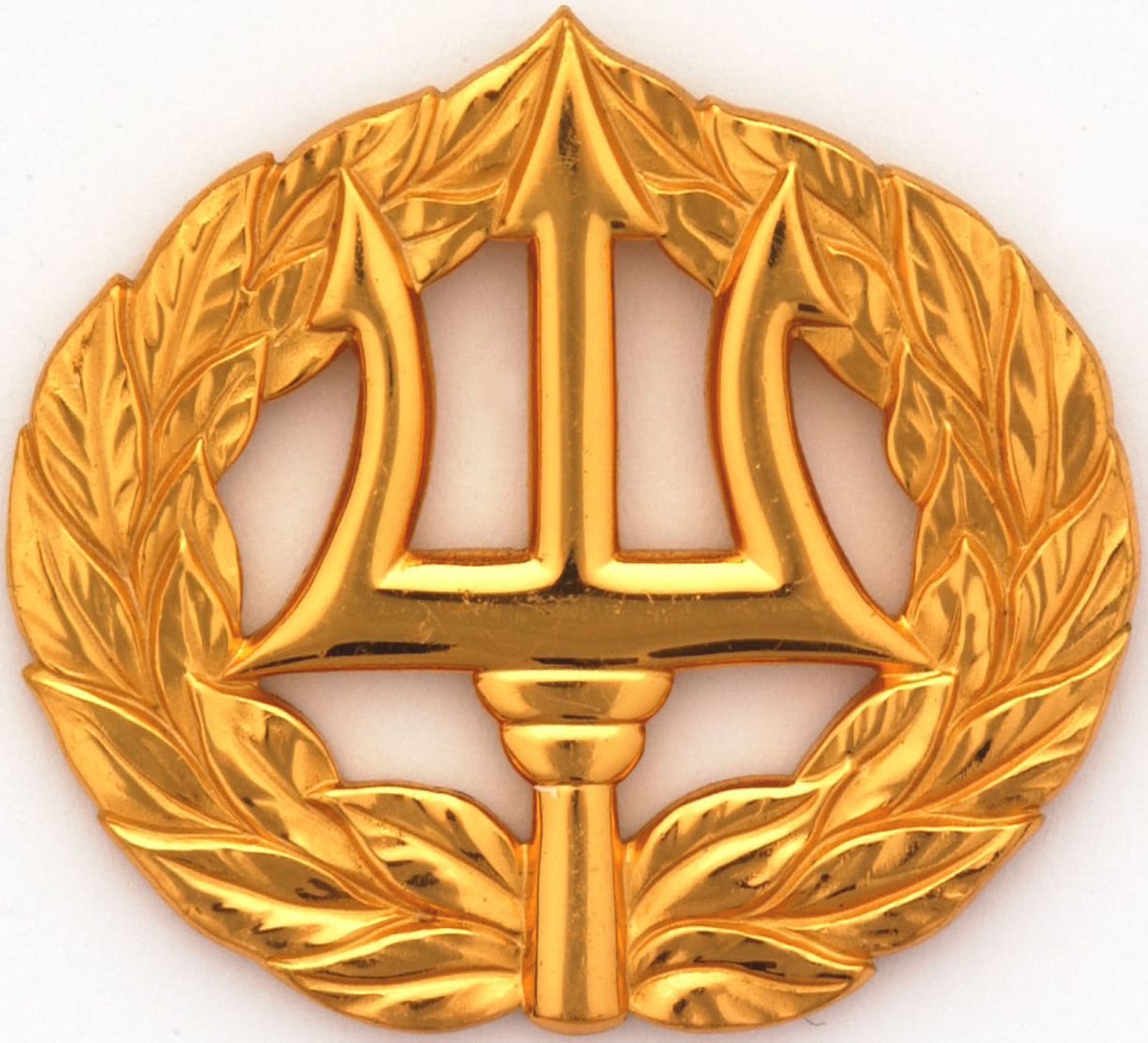

Surface Warfare Officer Insignia
| Navy Distinguished Service Medal | Defense Superior Service Medal with two bronze oak leaf clusters | Legion of Merit with two award stars |
| Defense Meritorious Service Medal with bronze oak leaf cluster | Meritorious Service Medal with award star | Navy and Marine Corps Commendation Medal with three award stars |
| Navy and Marine Corps Achievement Medal with award star | Joint Meritorious Unit Award | Navy Meritorious Unit Commendation with bronze service star |
| National Defense Service Medal with bronze service star | Southwest Asia Service Medal with bronze service star | Global War on Terrorism Service Medal |
| Armed Forces Service Medal | Navy Sea Service Deployment Ribbon with three bronze service stars | Navy and Marine Corps Overseas Service Ribbon with four bronze service stars |
Submarine Warfare insignia in silver
Command Ashore insignia
Office of the Joint Chiefs of Staff Identification Badge
Presidential Service Badge

Military offices
| Preceded by John G. Hannink | Deputy Judge Advocate General of the Navy; 2018–2021 | Succeeded by Christopher C. French |
| Preceded by John G. Hannink | Commander of the Naval Legal Service Command; 2018–2021 | Succeeded by David G. Wilson |
| Preceded by John G. Hannink | Judge Advocate General of the Navy; 2021–2024 | Succeeded by Christopher C. French |
