= Deputy Judge Advocate General of the Navy =

Military rank of the United States Navy

The deputy judge advocate general of the Navy (DJAG) is the second-highest ranking JAG officer and lawyer in the United States Navy. As part of the Judge Advocate General’s Corps, the DJAG also serves as Deputy Department of Defense Representative for Ocean Policy Affairs.

The DJAG was previously dual-hatted as commander of the Naval Legal Service Command (CNLSC), until the position was separated into a distinct position in 2021. Darse E. Crandall Jr. was the last DJAG to serve in both positions simultaneously.

== Appointment ==
Similar to the judge advocate general of the Navy (JAG), the DJAG is appointed by the president with the advice and consent of the Senate. The DJAG may be chosen from judge advocates of the Navy and Marine Corps who have the qualifications prescribed for the JAG. Upon appointment to the office of DJAG, the appointee, if they hold a lower rank, will be promoted to the rank of rear admiral or major general, as appropriate.

== List of deputy judge advocates general of the Navy ==
| Name | Photo | Branch | Term began | Term ended |
|---|---|---|---|---|
| RADM Michael F. Lohr | | USN | 2000 | 2002 |
| RADM James E. McPherson | | USN | 2002 | 2004 |
| RADM Bruce E. MacDonald | | USN | 2004 | 2006 |
| RADM James W. Houck | | USN | 2006 | 2009 |
| RADM Nanette M. DeRenzi | | USN | 2009 | 2012 |
| RADM James W. Crawford, III | | USN | 2012 | 2015 |
| RADM John G. Hannink | | USN | 2015 | 2018 |
| RADM Darse E. Crandall, Jr. | | USN | 2018 | 2021 |
| RADM Christopher C. French | | USN | 2021 | 2024 |
| RADM Lia M. Reynolds | | USN | 2024 | present |

== See also ==
- Staff Judge Advocate to the Commandant of the Marine Corps
