= John G. Hannink =

United States Navy officer

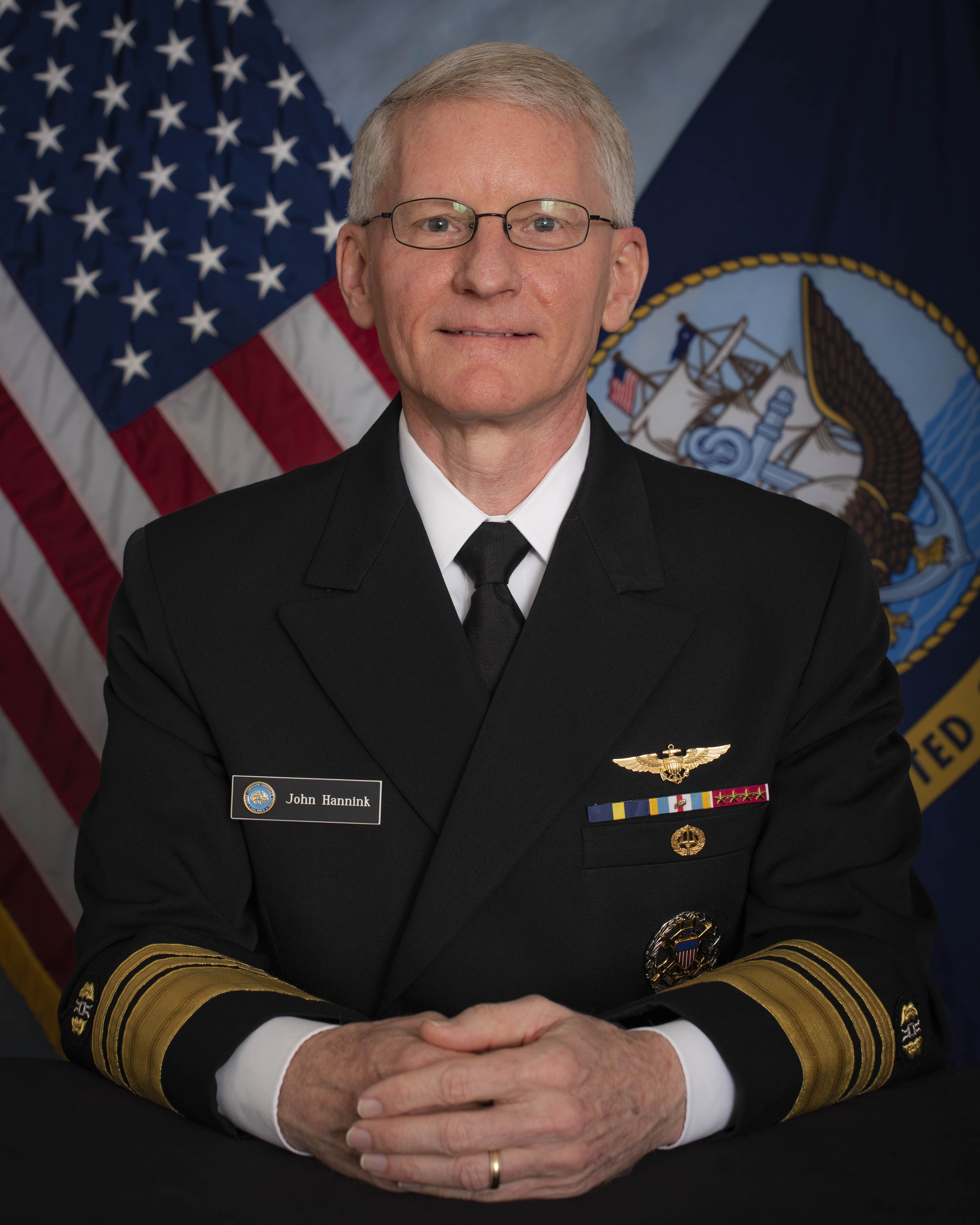
- Born: 1962 (age 63–64)
- Military career
- Allegiance: United States
- Branch: United States Navy
- Service years: 1985–2021
- Rank: Vice Admiral
- Commands: Judge Advocate General of the Navy; Deputy Judge Advocate General of the Navy
- Awards: Navy Distinguished Service Medal (3); Defense Superior Service Medal (2); Legion of Merit (5)

John G. Hannink (born 1962) is a retired United States Navy officer. He last served as the 44th Judge Advocate General (JAG) of the United States Navy. He assumed the position on September 12, 2018 following the retirement of Vice Admiral James W. Crawford, III and relinquished it on August 18, 2021 to Darse Crandall.

== Naval career ==
Hannink initially served as a Naval Aviator, assigned to Sea Control Squadron 33 (VS-33) at NAS North Island, flying the S-3 Viking and deploying aboard the aircraft carrier USS Nimitz (CVN 68). While assigned to VS-33, in addition to his duties as a pilot, he also served as the squadron’s public affairs officer, quality assurance officer and nuclear safety officer.

Upon graduation from Baylor Law School in 1994, Hannink transferred from the unrestricted line to the Judge Advocate General Corps.

Throughout his career, Hannink has served as the Deputy Judge Advocate General (DJAG) of the United States Navy, the Deputy Staff Judge Advocate for the United States Fifth and Second Fleets. He has also served as the special assistant to the Secretary of the Navy, Deputy Legal Counsel to the Joint Chiefs of Staff, special counsel to the Chief of Naval Operations, and the Deputy Staff Judge Advocate for the United States Pacific Command.

On 11 June 2018, Hannink was nominated for promotion to vice admiral and assignment as Judge Advocate General of the Navy. This nomination was confirmed by a voice vote of the United States Senate on June 28. He relinquished the JAG office to Darse Crandall on August 18, 2021 and retired immediately after.

Military offices
Preceded by James W. Crawford III	Deputy Judge Advocate General of the Navy; 2015–2018	Succeeded by Darse E. Crandall Jr.
Preceded by James W. Crawford III	Judge Advocate General of the Navy; 2018–2021	Succeeded by Darse E. Crandall Jr.
