= Nanette M. DeRenzi =

42nd Judge Advocate General of the Navy

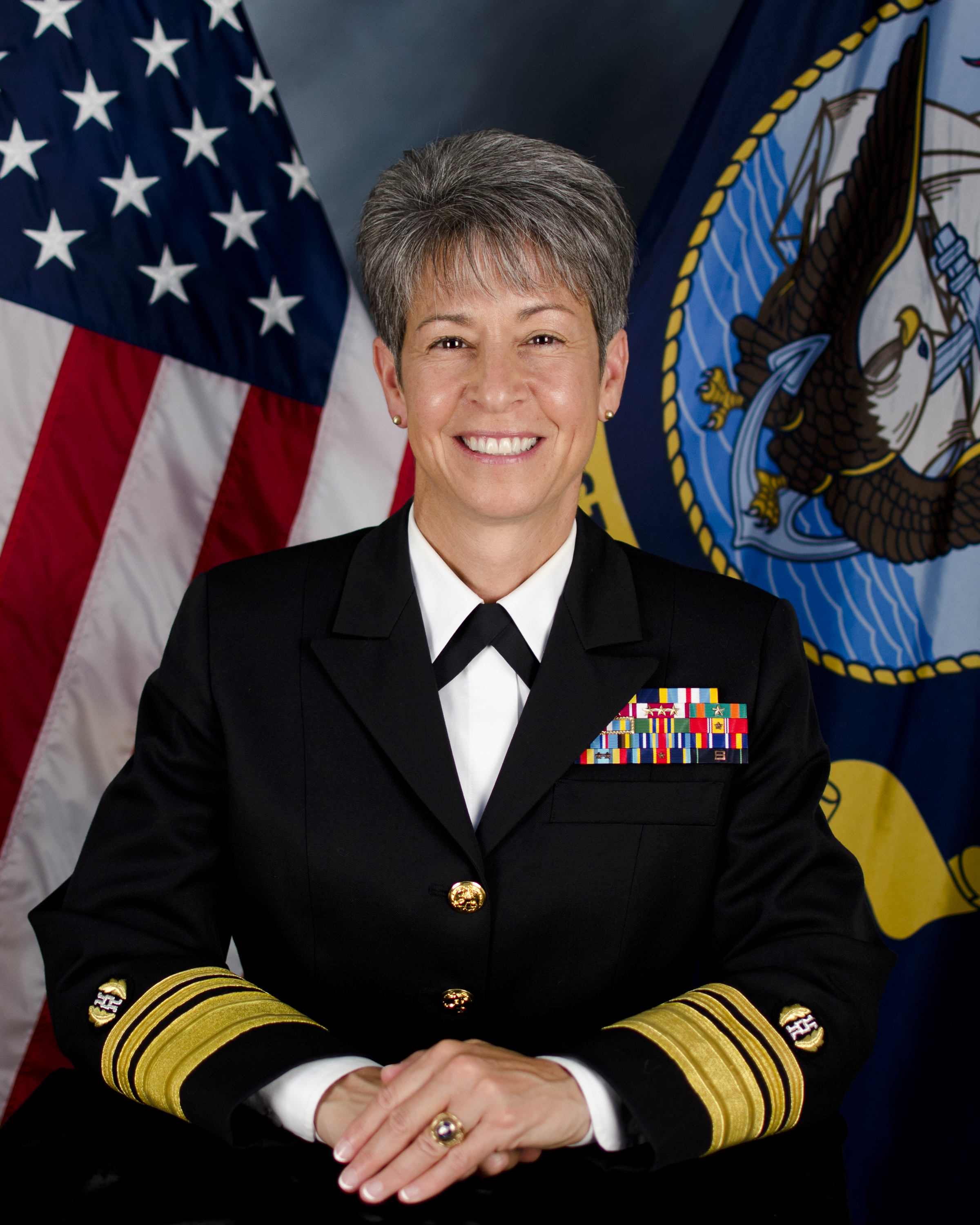
- DeRenzi in 2012
- Born: Philadelphia, Pennsylvania, U.S.
- Military career
- Allegiance: United States of America
- Branch: United States Navy
- Service years: 1984–2015
- Rank: Vice admiral
- Commands: Judge Advocate General of the Navy; Deputy Judge Advocate General of the Navy
- Awards: Navy Distinguished Service Medal; Defense Superior Service Medal; Legion of Merit; Meritorious Service Medal; Navy Achievement Medal

Nanette M. "Nan" DeRenzi is a former United States Navy officer. She served as the 42nd Judge Advocate General (JAG) of the United States Navy. She assumed that position on July 20, 2012 and held it until her retirement on June 26, 2015. Prior to that, she served as Deputy Judge Advocate General of the Navy (DJAG) from August 2009 to July 2012.

== Early life and education ==
DeRenzi was born in Philadelphia and raised in Pennsauken, New Jersey. She attended Camden Catholic High School and graduated magna cum laude from Villanova University in 1983. She was commissioned through the JAG Corps Student Program and, in 1986, graduated from the Temple University School of Law. She later earned a Master of Laws degree (Environmental Law) from the George Washington University Law School.

== Career ==
DeRenzi began her career as a litigator, first as a defense counsel and later as a trial counsel (prosecution) in Newport, Rhode Island, followed by assignments in appellate defense and civil litigation in Washington, DC. DeRenzi also served as the fleet judge advocate to commander, U.S. 7th and 3rd Fleets, as well as staff judge advocate to commander, Carrier Group 7. Before her appointment to flag rank, she served as the senior staff judge advocate for commander, U.S. Southern Command; special assistant for legal and legislative matters to the secretary of the Navy; legislative counsel for environmental programs in the Navy Office of Legislative Affairs; and executive assistant to the JAG. In command, she served as commanding officer, Naval Legal Service Office, North Central.

== Awards and education ==
DeRenzi's personal decorations include the Navy Distinguished Service Medal, the Defense Superior Service Medal, the Legion of Merit (four awards), the Meritorious Service Medal (four awards) and the Navy Achievement Medal (two awards).

Military offices
Preceded by James W. Houck	42nd Judge Advocate General of the Navy; 2012 – 2015	Succeeded by James W. Crawford III
