= Lesia L. Crumpton-Young =

American engineer and academic administrator

13th President of Texas Southern University
- In office June 2021 – June 2023
- Preceded by: Kenneth Huewitt (interim)
- Succeeded by: Mary Evans Sias (interim); James W. Crawford III

Personal details
- Spouse: Reginald R. Young
- Children: 2
- Education: Texas A&M University (BS, MS, PhD)
- Occupation: Engineer, academic administrator
- Website: lesiacrumptonyoung.com

Lesia L. Crumpton-Young is an American engineer and academic administrator. Served as the 13th president of Texas Southern University from 2021 to 2023. She was previously the provost and chief academic officer of Morgan State University.

== Education ==
Crumpton-Young completed a B.S. and M.S. degree at Texas A&M University. She was the first female African American Ph.D. graduate from the TAMU College of Engineering. She specializes in virtual reality, computer stimulations in ergonomics, design of displays and controls, workplace design, and carpal tunnel syndrome prevention.

== Career ==
Crumpton-Young was nominated by U.S. president Bill Clinton for a NSF Presidential Faculty Fellowship. She won the 1997 Black Engineer of the Year Educational Award. She received the 1999 Janice A. Lumpkin Educator of the Year Golden Torch Award from the National Society of Black Engineers. In 2000, she was the associate dean of research outreach at the Mississippi State University (MSU) College of Engineering. She developed the schools ergonomic and human factors program in the MSU department of industrial engineering.

At Texas A&M University, she was the associate provost and worked as a program director at the National Science Foundation. Crumpton-Young was the department head and professor of industrial engineering and management systems at the University of Central Florida. She received the Presidential Award for Excellence in Science, Mathematics, and Engineering Mentoring from U.S. president Barack Obama.

She was the vice president of research and institution advancement and chief research officer at Tennessee State University.

Crumpton-Young was the provost and senior vice president for academic affairs at Morgan State University. In 2019, she became the university's chief academic officer.Her appointment as Provost & Senior VP (effective July 1, 2019) included also being a tenured full professor in the department of industrial and systems engineering at Morgan’s Clarence M. Mitchell Jr. School of Engineering.

In June 2021, she was named as the 13th president of Texas Southern University, succeeding interim president Kenneth Huewitt. She retired in June 2023.

Afterwards, she invested her time to grow black students education in colleges and universities to a higher scale.

== Personal life ==
Crumpton-Young married Reginald R. Young. They have two daughters.

== Selected works ==
- Ferreras, Ana; Crumpton-Young, Lesia L. (2017). Company Success in Manufacturing Organizations: A Holistic Systems Approach. CRC Press. ISBN 978-1-4822-3317-9.
- Crumpton-Young, Lesia L. (2019). Key Productivity and Performance Strategies to Advance Your Career. Elsevier. ISBN 978-0-12-799956-2.
