= Seiko Okano =

U.S. Navy officer

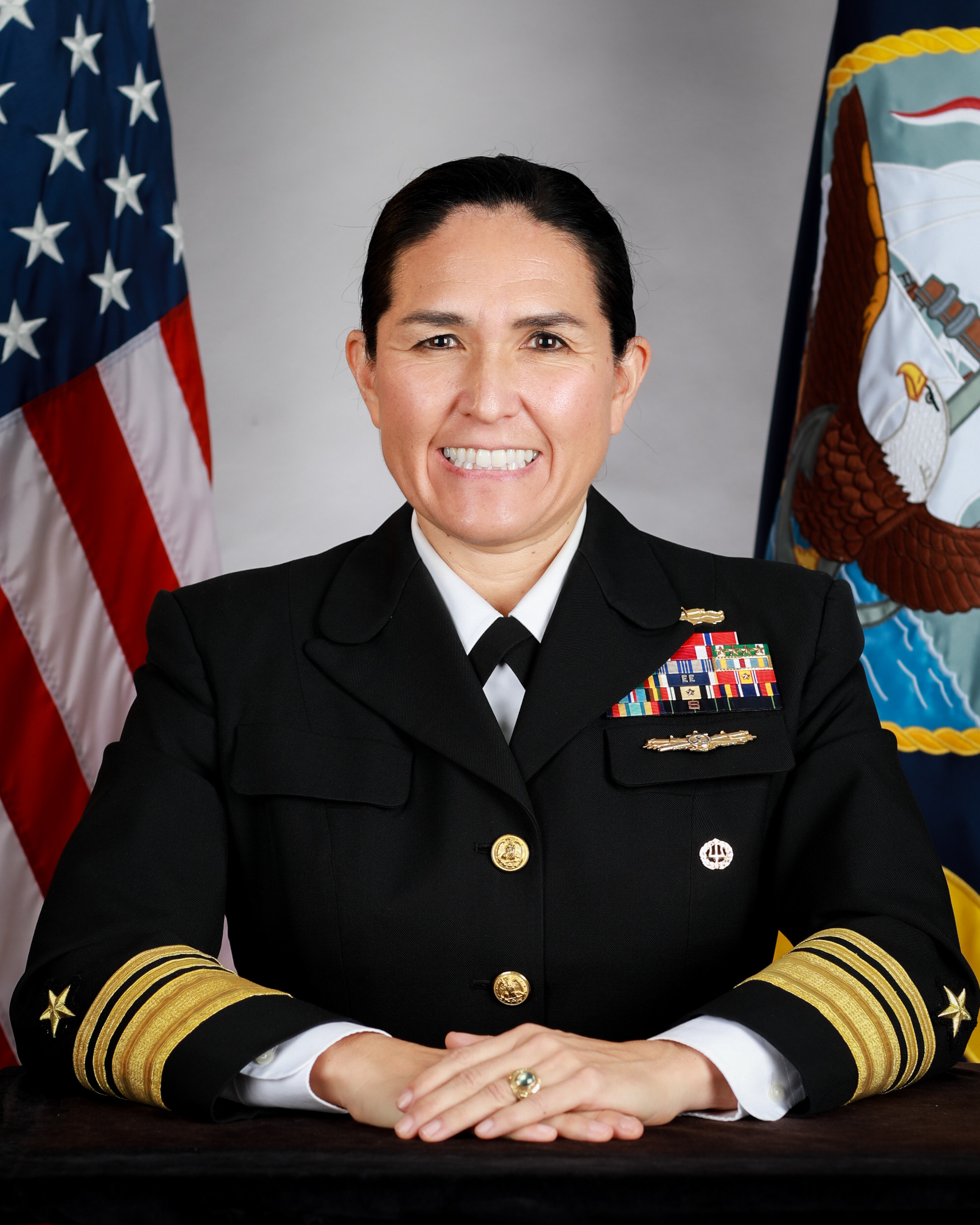
- Born: Lexington,Kentucky
- Branch: United States Navy
- Service years: 1994 − present
- Rank: Vice Admiral
- Commands: NAVWAR
- Awards: Legion of Merit; Bronze Star
- Alma mater: United States Naval Academy (B.S.); Naval Postgraduate School (M.S.)

Vice Admiral Seiko Okano is United States Navy flag officer and since August 2025, she is serving as the Principal Military Deputy Assistant Secretary of the Navy (Research, Development and Acquisition).

== Early years and education ==
Okano was born in Lexington, Kentucky and raised in Evanston, Illinois. She is from a "blended cultural family" - her mother is Irish Catholic from Louisiana and her father is Japanese.

In high school, she was a swimmer and was recruited to swim for the United States Naval Academy.

Okano graduated in 1994 from U.S. Naval Academy, with a Bachelor of Science in Aerospace Engineering. She earned a Master of Science in Space Systems Engineering from the Naval Postgraduate School, where she was also selected for transfer to the engineering duty officer community.

== Military career ==
Okano's operational tours include gunnery and fire control officer, and electrical division officer on USS Belleau Wood (LHA-3) which she deployed to Somalia; and Amphibious Force 7th Fleet flag aide in Okinawa, Japan. During Operation Iraqi Freedom, she served on Joint Crew Composite Squadron One in Tikrit, Iraq to assist with defeating radio-controlled improvised explosive devices.

As an engineering duty officer since 2001, Okano had a number of tours in acquisition, starting with Space and Naval Warfare Systems Center, San Diego, California; Missile Defense Agency, Aegis Ballistic Missile Defense System; Military Satellite Communications Wing, Space and Missile Systems Center; and Naval Surface Warfare Center, Port Hueneme. Moving to the Program Executive Office for Integrated Warfare Systems (PEO IWS), Okano was the major program manager for Above Water Sensors (PEO IWS 2) overseeing the development and sustainment of all surface radars, electronic warfare systems, and directed energy programs. Later, she served as executive assistant to the Assistant Secretary of the Navy (Research, Development and Acquisition).

Okano was assigned as Principal Military Deputy Assistant Secretary of the Navy for Research, Development and Acquisition in August 2025. Her previous flag assignments include Program Executive Officer for Integrated Warfare Systems in July 2020, and Commander of Naval Information Warfare Systems Command from August 2024 to August 2025.

Okano was nominated for promotion to vice admiral in June 2025.

== Decorations and honors ==
Okano's decorations include the Legion of Merit, Bronze Star Medal, Defense Meritorious Service Medal, and various other individual, and unit campaign and service awards.
