= Legalman =

United States Navy occupational rating

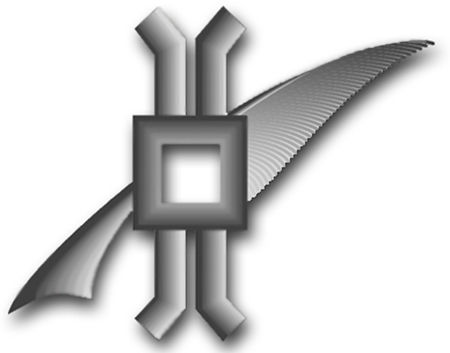
- Rating insignia
- Issued by: United States Navy
- Type: Enlisted rating
- Abbreviation: LN
- Specialty: Administration

Legalman (abbreviated as LN) is a United States Navy occupational rating.

Legalmen:

- Perform paralegal duties under the direction and supervision of Judge Advocates in providing and administering legal services, including matters concerned with military justice, administrative discharges, claims, admiralty law and legal assistance
- Record and transcribe proceedings of courts-martial, courts of inquiry, investigations and military commissions and prepare and submit necessary records and reports
- Prepare correspondence
- Conduct interviews
- Serve as military notaries public
- Perform legal research of pertinent material for evaluation
- Provide advice and assistance to personnel and command on matters of legal administration

== See also ==
- List of United States Navy ratings § Administration, deck, technical, and weapons specialty ratings (at "Legalman")
- Uniforms of the United States Marine Corps § Wear by Navy personnel
