= Judge Advocate General of the Navy =

Highest-ranking uniformed lawyer in the United States Department of the Navy

Judge Advocate General of the Department of the Navy
- JAG
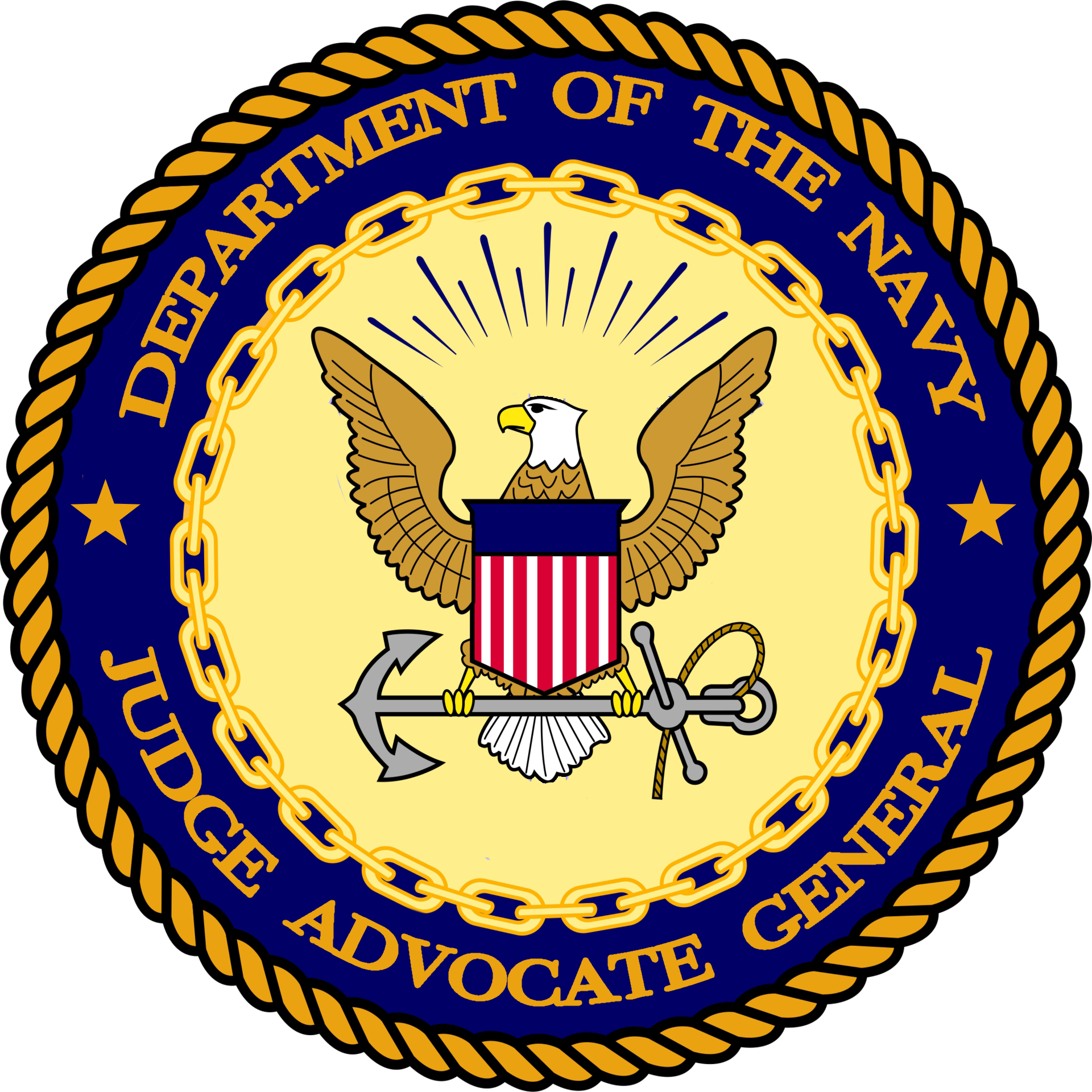
- Seal of the Office of the Judge Advocate General

- Flag of a U.S. Navy rear admiral

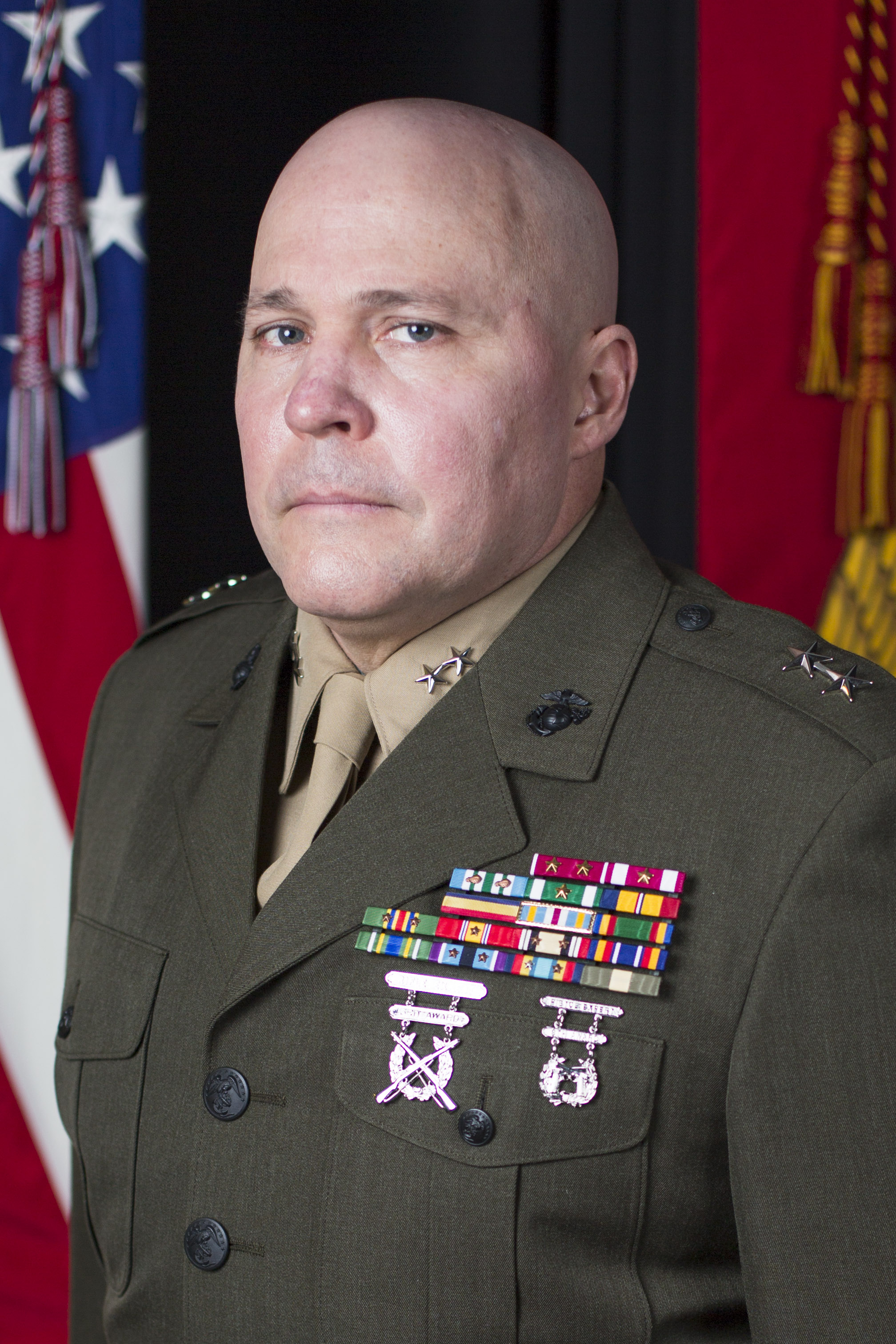
- Incumbent; MajGen David J. Bligh, USMC since August 2025
- Department of the Navy; Office of the Secretary
- Reports to: Secretary of the Navy; Chief of Naval Operations
- Seat: The Pentagon, Arlington County, Virginia, United States
- Appointer: The president with Senate advice and consent
- Term length: Four years
- Constituting instrument: 10 U.S.C. § 8088
- Formation: 1880
- First holder: Colonel William Butler Remey, USMC
- Deputy: Deputy Judge Advocate General of the Navy
- Website: Official website

The judge advocate general of the Navy (JAG) is the highest-ranking uniformed lawyer in the United States Department of the Navy. The judge advocate general is the principal advisor to the secretary of the Navy and the chief of naval operations on legal matters pertaining to the Navy. The judge advocate general also performs other duties prescribed to them under 10 U.S.C. § 8088 and those prescribed under the Uniform Code of Military Justice.

== Duties ==
The judge advocate general of the Navy, according to the United States Navy Regulations, has three principal roles: Staff Assistant in the Office of the Secretary of the Navy, commanding the Office of the Judge Advocate General (OJAG), and is Chief of the Judge Advocate General's Corps.

The judge advocate general maintains a close working relationship with the general counsel of the Department of the Navy, the senior civilian lawyer in the Department of the Navy.

The judge advocate general:

- provides or supervises the provision of all legal advice and related services throughout the Department of the Navy, except for the advice and services provided by the general counsel;
- performs the functions required or authorized by law;
- provides legal and policy advice to the secretary of the Navy on military justice, administrative law, claims, operational and international law, and litigation involving these issues, and;
- acts on other matters as directed by the secretary of the Navy.

The principal deputy to the JAG is the deputy judge advocate general of the Navy.

== Nomination and appointment ==
The judge advocate general is nominated for appointment by the president with the advice and/or suggestion of the secretary of defense and the secretary of the Navy, and must be confirmed via majority vote by the Senate. The judge advocate general is appointed to a four-year term of office but they historically serve for three. The judge advocate general has also historically been a naval officer; however, statute states that a Marine officer can be appointed to the position as long as they meet the requirements stated in the section.

Previously, the judge advocate general was appointed as a two-star rear admiral. In 2008, the National Defense Authorization Act for Fiscal Year 2008 advanced the position of the judge advocate general to a statutory three-star vice admiral or lieutenant general. The statutory three-star rank was amended and struck from U.S. law in the National Defense Authorization Act for Fiscal Year 2017; however, the Navy continued to appoint the JAG to that rank until 2025.

Other than age and years of military service, there is no other statute of limitations on how many times the JAG can be renominated for appointment to that position if the president so chooses; however, the JAG normally serves one term.

== List of judge advocates general of the Navy ==
No.	Name	Photo	Branch	Term began	Term ended
1	Col William Butler Remey		USMC	1880	1892
2	CAPT Samuel Conrad Lemly		USN	1892	1904
3	CAPT Samuel Willauer Black Diehl		USN	1904	1907
4	CAPT Edward Hale Campbell		USN	1907	1909
5	CAPT Robert Lee Russell		USN	1909	1913
6	CAPT Ridley McLean		USN	1913	1916
7	CAPT William Carleton Watts		USN	1917	1918
8	RADM George Ramsey Clark		USN	1918	1921
9	RADM Julian Lane Latimer		USN	1921	1925
10	RADM Edward Hale Campbell		USN	1925	1929
11	RADM David F. Sellers		USN	1929	1931
12	RADM Orin Gould Murfin		USN	1931	1934
13	RADM Claude C. Bloch		USN	1934	1936
14	RADM Gilbert Jonathan Rowcliff		USN	1936	1938
15	RADM Walter Browne Woodson		USN	1938	1943
16	RADM Thomas Leigh Gatch		USN	1943	1945
17	RADM Oswald Symister Colclough		USN	1945	1948
18	RADM George Lucius Russell		USN	1948	1952
19	RADM Ira Hudson Nunn		USN	1952	1956
20	RADM Chester Charles Ward		USN	1956	1960
21	RADM William Chamberlain Mott		USN	1960	1964
22	RADM Wilfred Asquith Hearn		USN	1964	1968
23	RADM Joseph Bryan McDevitt		USN	1968	1972
24	RADM Merlin Howard Staring		USN	1972	1975
25	RADM Horace Bascomb Robertson Jr.		USN	1975	1976
26	RADM William Owen Miller		USN	1976	1978
27	RADM Charles Eager McDowell		USN	1978	1980
28	RADM John Smith Jenkins		USN	1980	1982
29	RADM James Joseph McHugh		USN	1982	1984
30	RADM Thomas Edward Flynn		USN	1984	1986
31	RADM Hugh Don Campbell		USN	1986	1988
32	RADM Everett Don Stumbaugh		USN	1988	1990
33	RADM John Edward Gordon		USN	1990	1992
34	RADM William Leon Schachte Jr.		USN	1992	1993
35	RADM Harold Eric Grant		USN	1993	1997
36	RADM John Dudley Hutson		USN	1997	2000
37	RADM Donald J. Guter		USN	2000	2002
38	RADM Michael F. Lohr		USN	2002	2004
39	RADM James E. McPherson		USN	2004	2006
40	VADM Bruce E. MacDonald		USN	2006	2009
41	VADM James W. Houck		USN	14 August 2009	20 July 2012
42	VADM Nanette M. DeRenzi		USN	20 July 2012	26 June 2015
43	VADM James W. Crawford, III		USN	26 June 2015	12 September 2018
44	VADM John G. Hannink		USN	12 September 2018	18 August 18, 2021
45	VADM Darse Crandall		USN	18 August 2021	5 September 2024
46	VADM Christopher C. French		USN	5 September 2024	1 January 2025
Acting	RADM Lia M. Reynolds		USN	1 January 2025	6 August 2025
47	MajGen David J. Bligh		USMC	6 August 2025	Present

== See also ==
- Judge Advocate General of the Army
- Judge Advocate General of the Air Force
- U.S. Marine Corps Judge Advocate Division
- Navy-Marine Corps Court of Criminal Appeal
- Naval Inspector General
- JAG (television series)
- U.S. Army Judge Advocate General's Corps
- U.S. Air Force Judge Advocate General's Corps
- U.S. Coast Guard Legal Division
