= Naval Legal Service Command =

Command of the United States Navy

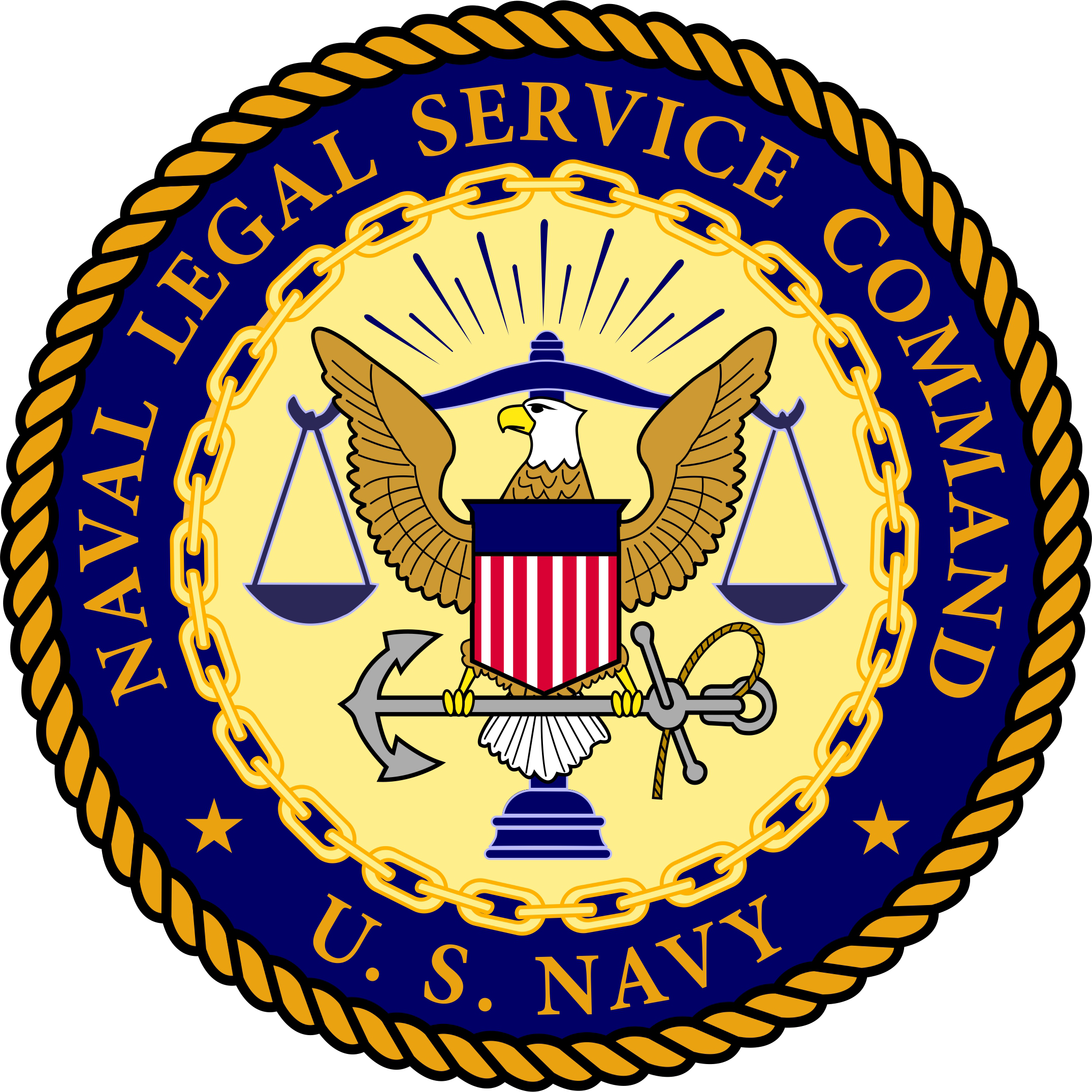
NLSC seal.

The Naval Legal Service Command is an Echelon 2 command of the United States Navy. Its stated mission is to provide legal services to the worldwide components of the fleet.

The Region Legal Service Offices, Defense Service Offices, and Victims’ Legal Counsel Program deliver a range of assistance, such as legal advice, Fleet services, and military justice support in their respective areas of responsibility within the command. They also perform other functions and tasks requested or directed by a competent authority.

The command was led by the Deputy Judge Advocate General of the Navy until 2021 when the offices were separated. Rear Admiral David G. Wilson became the first independent commander of the Naval Legal Service Command; reporting to the Chief of Naval Operations.

== See also ==
- Staff Judge Advocate to the Commandant of the Marine Corps
- United States Navy Judge Advocate General's Corps
