= United States Navy Judge Advocate General's Corps =

Staff corps and legal arm of the US Navy

Judge Advocate General's Corps
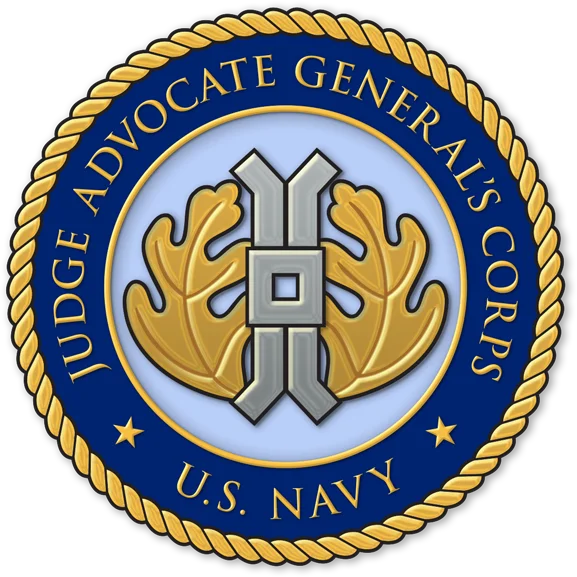
- Founded: December 8, 1967
- Country: United States
- Branch: United States Navy
- Role: Military law
- Part of: Department of the Navy
- Garrison/HQ: Washington Navy Yard, Washington, D.C., U.S.

Commanders
- JAG: MajGen David J. Bligh
- DJAG: RADM Lia M. Reynolds

Insignia
- Identification symbol

The Judge Advocate General's Corps, also known as the "JAG Corps" or "JAG", is the legal arm of the United States Navy. Today, the JAG Corps consists of a worldwide organization of more than 1,000 commissioned officers serving as judge advocates, 550 enlisted members (primarily in the legalman rating), and nearly 700 civilian personnel, all serving under the direction of the judge advocate general of the Navy. The organization also includes more than 550 Reserve officers and enlisted members in the Navy Reserve Law Program.

The Office of the Judge Advocate General of the Navy is located in Washington, D.C.

== History ==
In 1775, the Continental Congress enacted the Articles of Conduct, governing the ships and men of the Continental Navy. However, all of these ships were soon sold and Navy and Marine Corps were disbanded. In July 1797, Congress authorized the construction of six frigates and enacted the Rules for Regulation of the Navy as a temporary measure. Then, in 1800, Congress enacted a more sophisticated code adopted directly from the British Naval Code of 1749. There was little or no need for lawyers to interpret these simple codes, nor was there a need for lawyers in the uncomplicated administration of the Navy prior to the Civil War.

During the Civil War, however, Secretary of the Navy Gideon Welles named a young assistant U.S. attorney in the District of Columbia named Nathaniel Wilson to present the government's case in complicated courts-martial. Without any statutory authority, Secretary Welles gave Wilson the title of "Solicitor of the Navy Department," making him the first house counsel to the U.S. Navy.

By the Act of March 2, 1865, Congress authorized the president "to appoint, by and with the advice and consent of the Senate, for service during the rebellion and one year thereafter, an officer of the [Navy] to be called the 'Solicitor and Naval Judge Advocate General.'" The United States Congress maintained the billet on a year-to-year basis by amendments to the Naval Appropriations Acts. In 1870, Congress transferred the billet to a newly established Justice Department with the title of Naval Solicitor.

Colonel William Butler Remey, U.S. Marine Corps, was the first uniformed chief legal officer of the Navy, in 1878. Colonel Remey was able to convince Congress that the Navy Department needed a permanent uniformed judge advocate general and that naval law was so unique it would be better to appoint a line officer of the Navy or Marine Corps. The bill to create the billet of judge advocate general of the Navy was signed in 1880.

The Naval Appropriations Act of 1918 elevated the billets of navy bureau chiefs and judge advocate general to rear admiral. In July 1918, Captain George Ramsey Clark was appointed the first judge advocate general to hold the rank of rear admiral.

In 1946, the Naval Justice School was established at Port Hueneme, Calif., to provide legal training for all Navy, Marine Corps, and Coast Guard lawyers, enlisted legal professionals, active and reserve.

In 1947, the Navy created a "law specialist" program to allow line officers restricted duty to perform legal services. By the Act of May 5, 1950, Congress required that the judge advocate general be a lawyer. The act also required each judge advocate general of any service be a member of the bar with not less than eight years of legal duties as a commissioned officer. The Act also enacted the first Uniform Code of Military Justice (UCMJ).

By 1967, the Navy had 20 years of experience with the law specialist program. There was, however, increasing pressure to create a separate corps of lawyers. That year, Congress decided to establish the Judge Advocate General's Corps within the Department of the Navy. The legislation was signed into law by President Lyndon B. Johnson on December 8, 1967, and ensured navy lawyers as staff officers within the navy, and ensured Navy lawyers’ status as members of a distinct professional group within the Navy, similar to physicians and chaplains.

On December 3, 1973, by Notice 5450, the chief of naval operations (CNO) officially established the Naval Legal Service, “to administer the legal services program and provide command direction for all Naval Legal Service activities and resources as may be assigned; and to perform such other functions or tasks as may be related to the Naval Legal Service as directed by the CNO.” Navy Legal Service Offices were created in 1976 and responsible for providing defense and legal assistance to eligible personnel; Trial Service Offices were established in the mid-1990s and responsible for providing courts-martial prosecution, court reporting and administrative trial support; and Staff Judge Advocates provided legal advice to U.S. naval base commanding officers. In 2004, the judge advocate general approved the merger of the Navy's Trial Service Offices and Staff Judge Advocates into new commands known as Region Legal Service Offices. On October 1, 2012, the eight Navy Legal Service Offices were disestablished, and four Defense Service Offices were established.

In 2023, the Navy significantly reformed its military justice system and established the Office of Special Trial Counsel, which oversees the prosecution of sailors and other service members who commit personal violence offenses, including sexual assault.

Today, the judge advocate general directs a worldwide organization of active and reserve component judge advocates, active and reserve component enlisted, and civilian personnel. The judge advocate general provides legal and policy advice to the secretary of the Navy in all legal matters concerning military justice, administrative law, environmental law, ethics, claims, admiralty, operational and international law, litigation, and legal assistance.

== Insignia ==
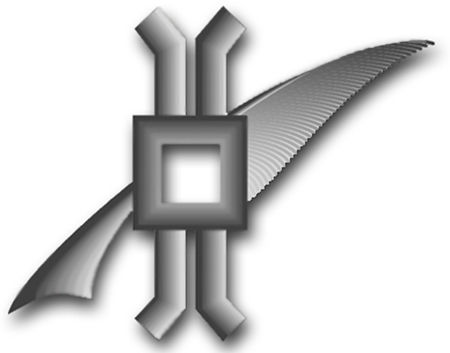
Legalman enlisted rating insignia

The distinctive JAG Corps insignia incorporates the millrind. In ancient France, the fer de moline, or millrind, was a symbol of equal justice for all under the law. The two counterbalancing oak leaves are identical and connote the scales upon which justice is weighed. Oak leaves denote a corps and symbolize strength, particularly the strength of the oak-timbered hulls of the early American Navy ships. In the milling of grains, the millrind was used to keep the stone-grinding wheels an equal distance apart to provide consistency in the milling process. Thus, it symbolizes the wheels of justice that must grind exceedingly fine and exceptionally even. In the 16th century, the millrind was adopted in England as a symbol for lawyers and later brought to America.

The legalman insignia incorporates the millrind and quill pen. The quill pen annotates the administrative nature and responsibilities that paralegals have for their attorneys.

== U.S. Navy ranks and insignias for JAG officers ==
Uniformed services pay grade	Special grade	O-10	O-9	O-8	O-7	O-6	O-5	O-4	O-3	O-2	O-1
United States Navy JAG Corps
United States Navy JAG Corps			Vice admiral	Rear admiral	Rear admiral (lower half)	Captain	Commander	Lieutenant commander	Lieutenant	Lieutenant (junior grade)	Ensign

== Legalman ==
See: List of United States Navy ratings § Administration, deck, technical, and weapons specialty ratings (at "Legalman")

Legalmen are trained paralegals who assist Navy and Marine Corps judge advocates and work in Navy legal offices throughout the fleet.

On January 4, 1972, Secretary of the Navy John H. Chafee approved the recommendation for establishment of the legalman enlisted rating. A memorandum from the chairman of the Rating Review Board announced the approval, stating in part, "the scope of the new rating will provide judge advocates with the personnel trained in court reporting, claims matters, investigations, legal administration, and legal research. This scope is in consonance with the new concept in the civilian legal community where many areas of legal services can be provided by competent trained personnel under the supervision of a lawyer." On October 4, 1972, 275 petty officers were selected for conversion to the new legalman rating.

In 2007, the legalman education and training pipeline was adapted in order to fully train legalmen as paralegals. The Naval Justice School's curriculum was adapted to include four American Bar Association approved paralegal college courses. Legalmen now leave Naval Justice School with 10 semester hours of college credit in paralegal studies.

== Judge Advocate General of the Navy ==
The judge advocate general of the Navy and the deputy judge advocate general of the Navy are appointed positions. They are both nominated by the U.S. president and must be confirmed via majority vote by the U.S. Senate. They are appointed to a four-year term of office but they usually serve for three. They have historically been officers in the service of the Navy. Federal statutes, however, state that a Marine officer can be appointed to either position as long as they meet the requirements stated in the section. Currently, the judge advocate general is appointed as a two-star rear admiral or major general while holding office, and the deputy judge advocate general is also currently appointed as a two-star rear admiral or a major general. Other than age and years of military service, there is no other statute of limitations on how many times they can be re-nominated for appointment to that position if the president so chooses.

== Offices ==
=== Headquarters ===
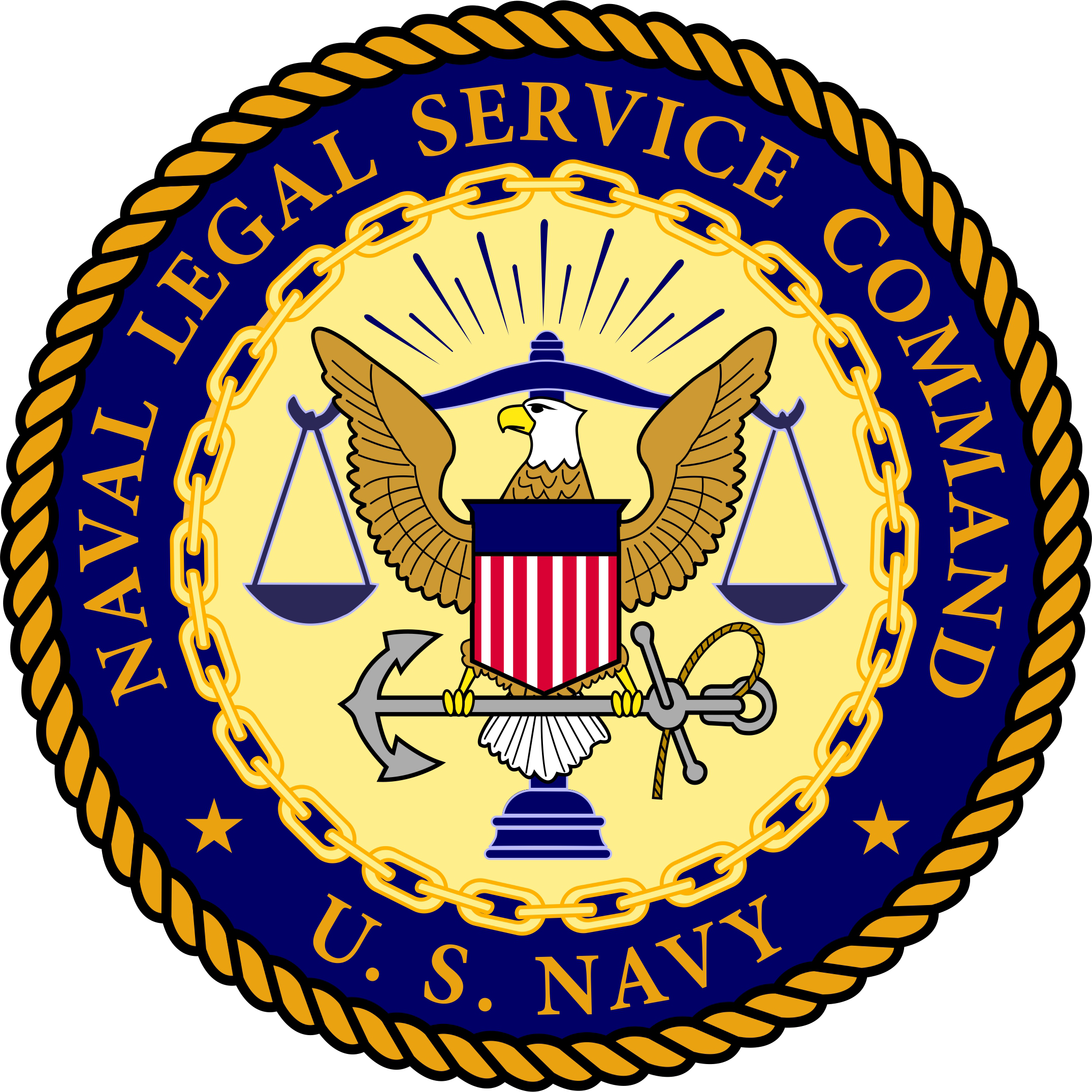
The seal for Naval Legal Service Command (NLSC).

- Office of the Judge Advocate General (OJAG), Washington Navy Yard, Washington, D.C.
- Headquarters, Naval Legal Service Command (NLSC), Washington Navy Yard, Washington, D.C.

==== Defense Service Offices (DSO) ====
North

- DSO North Headquarters, Washington Navy Yard, Washington, D.C.
- DSO North Detachment, Naval Support Activity Naples, Italy
- DSO North Branch Office, Naval Support Activity Bahrain, Bahrain
- DSO North Detachment, Naval Station Rota, Spain
- DSO North Branch Office, U.S. Naval Academy, Maryland
- DSO North Detachment Groton, Naval Submarine Base New London, Connecticut
- DSO North Detachment Great Lakes, Naval Station Great Lakes, Illinois

West

- DSO West Headquarters, Naval Base San Diego, California
- DSO West Bremerton, Naval Station Bremerton, Washington
- DSO West Branch Office, Naval Station Everett, Washington
- DSO West Branch Office, Naval Air Station Lemoore, California

Pacific

- DSO Pacific Headquarters Yokosuka, United States Fleet Activities Yokosuka, Japan
- DSO Pacific Detachment Sasebo, United States Fleet Activities Sasebo, Japan
- DSO Pacific Detachment Guam, Naval Base Guam, Guam
- DSO Pacific Detachment Pearl Harbor, Pearl Harbor Naval Shipyard, Hawaii

Southeast

- DSO Southeast Headquarters, Naval Station Norfolk, Virginia
- DSO Southeast Detachment Mayport, Naval Station Mayport, Florida
- DSO Southeast Detachment Pensacola, Naval Air Station Pensacola, Florida
- DSO Southeast Branch Office Jacksonville, Naval Air Station Jacksonville, Florida
- DSO Southeast Branch Office Gulfport, Naval Construction Battalion Center Gulfport, Mississippi
- DSO Southeast Remote Office New Orleans, Naval Air Station Joint Reserve Base New Orleans, Louisiana
- DSO Southeast Remote Office Millington, Naval Support Activity Mid-South, Tennessee
- DSO Southeast Remote Office Kings Bay, Naval Submarine Base Kings Bay, Georgia
- DSO Southeast Remote Office Guantanamo Bay, Naval Base Guantanamo Bay, Cuba

==== Region Legal Service Offices (RLSO) ====
Naval District Washington

- RLSO Naval District Washington Headquarters, Washington Navy Yard, Washington, D.C.
- RLSO Naval District Washington Branch Office Pentagon, Virginia
- RLSO Naval District Washington Branch Office Walter Reed National Military Medical Center, Maryland
- RLSO Naval District Washington Branch Office U.S. Naval Academy, Maryland
- RLSO Naval District Washington Branch Office Patuxent River, Naval Air Station Patuxent River, Maryland
- RLSO Midwest, Naval Station Great Lakes, Illinois

Southeast

- RLSO Southeast Headquarters Jacksonville, Naval Air Station Jacksonville, Florida
- RLSO Southeast Detachment Mayport, Naval Station Mayport, Florida
- RLSO Southeast Detachment Pensacola, Naval Air Station Pensacola, Florida
- RLSO Southeast Detachment Guantanamo Bay, Naval Base Guantanamo Bay, Cuba
- RLSO Southeast Detachment New Orleans, Naval Air Station Joint Reserve Base New Orleans, Louisiana
- RLSO Southeast Branch Office Gulfport, Naval Construction Battalion Center. Mississippi
- RLSO Southeast Branch Office Meridan, Naval Air Station Meridan, Mississippi
- RLSO Southeast Branch Office Millington, Naval Support Activity Mid-South, Tennessee
- RLSO Southeast Branch Office Fort Worth, Naval Air Station Joint Reserve Base Fort Worth, Texas
- RLSO Southeast Branch Office Corpus Christi, Naval Air Station Corpus Christi, Texas
- RLSO Southeast Branch Office Kingsville, Naval Air Station Kingsville, Texas
- RLSO Southeast Branch Office Key West, Naval Air Station Key West
- RLSO Southeast Branch Office Guantanamo Bay, Guantanamo Bay Naval Base, Cuba

Mid-Atlantic

- RLSO Mid-Atlantic Headquarters, Naval Station Norfolk, Virginia
- RLSO Mid-Atlantic Branch Office Oceana, Naval Air Station Oceana, Virginia
- RLSO Mid-Atlantic Branch Office Little Creek, Joint Expeditionary Base-Little Creek / Fort Story, Virginia
- RLSO Mid-Atlantic Detachment Groton, Naval Submarine Base New London, Connecticut
- RLSO Mid-Atlantic Detachment Newport, Naval Station Newport, Rhode Island

Southwest

- RLSO Southwest Headquarters, Naval Station San Diego, California
- RLSO Southwest Branch Office Ventura County, Naval Surface Warfare Center Port Hueneme, California
- RLSO Southwest Branch Office Lemoore, Naval Air Station Lemoore, California
- RLSO Southwest Branch Office Point Loma, Naval Base Point Loma, California
- RLSO Southwest Branch Office Coronado, Naval Base Coronado, California
- RLSO Southwest Branch Office Fallon, Naval Air Station Fallon, Nevada
- RLSO Southwest Branch Office China Lake, Naval Air Weapons Station China Lake, California
- RLSO Southwest Branch Office Monterey, Naval Support Activity Monterey, California

Northwest

- RLSO Northwest Headquarters, Naval Station Bremerton, Washington
- RLSO Northwest Branch Office Everett, Naval Station Everett, Washington
- RLSO Northwest Branch Office Kitsap Bangor, Naval Station Kitsap Bangor, Washington
- RLSO Northwest Branch Office Whidbey Island, Naval Air Station Whidbey Island, Washington

Pacific

- RLSO Western Pacific (WESTPAC) Headquarters, United States Fleet Activities Yokosuka, Japan
- RLSO WESTPAC Detachment Hawaii, Joint Base Pearl Harbor-Hickam, Hawaii
- RLSO WESTPAC Branch Office Guam, Naval Base Guam, Guam
- RLSO WESTPAC Branch Office Sasebo, Commander Fleet Activities Chinhae, Japan
- RLSO WESTPAC Branch Office Atsugi, Naval Air Facility Atsugi, Japan
- RLSO WESTPAC Branch Office Misawa, Naval Air Facility Misawa, Japan
- RLSO WESTPAC Branch Office Okinawa, Commander Fleet Activities Okinawa, Japan
- RLSO WESTPAC Branch Office Diego Garcia, Naval Support Facility Diego Garcia
- RLSO WESTPAC Branch Office Singapore, Singapore Area Coordinator, Singapore

Europe Africa Central

- RLSO Europe Africa Central (EURAFCENT) Headquarters, Naval Support Activity Naples, Italy
- RLSO EURAFCENT Detachment Rota, Naval Station Rota, Spain
- RLSO EURAFCENT Detachment Sigonella, Naval Air Station Sigonella, Italy
- RLSO EURAFCENT Detachment Bahrain, Naval Support Activity Bahrain, Bahrain
- RLSO EURAFCENT Detachment Souda Bay, Naval Support Activity Souda Bay, Greece
- RLSO EURAFCENT Detachment London, England

==== Trial Judiciary Offices ====
- Northern Circuit, Washington Navy Yard, D.C. / Marine Corps Base Quantico, Virginia
- Central Circuit, Norfolk, Virginia
- Eastern Circuit, Camp Lejeune, North Carolina
- Southern Circuit, Pensacola, Jacksonville / Mayport, Florida
- Southern Circuit, Parris Island, South Carolina / Beaufort, South Carolina
- Southwestern Circuit, San Diego, California
- Western Circuit, Camp Pendleton, California
- Northwest Circuit, Bremerton, Washington
- Hawaii Circuit, Pearl Harbor, Hawaii
- WESTPAC Circuit, Yokosuka, Japan
- WESTPAC Circuit, Okinawa, Japan
- EURAFCENT Circuit, Naples, Italy

== See also ==
- United States Marine Corps Judge Advocate Division
- Staff Judge Advocate to the Commandant of the Marine Corps
- Navy-Marine Corps Court of Criminal Appeals
- United States Army Judge Advocate General's Corps
- United States Air Force Judge Advocate General's Corps
- Category:Judge advocates general of the United States Coast Guard
- United States Coast Guard Legal Division
- Judge Advocate General's Corps
- Judge Advocate General
- Military law

Equivalents in other countries

- Judge Advocate of the Fleet
- Judge Advocate General (United Kingdom)
- Judge Advocate General (Canada)

Portrayal in media

- JAG (TV series)
- A Few Good Men
