= Charles H. Swannack Jr. =

United States Army officer

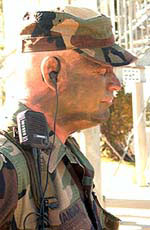
- Major General Charles Swannack Jr. (retired)
- Born: March 9, 1949 (age 77)
- Military career
- Allegiance: U.S. Army
- Service years: 1971–2006
- Rank: Major general
- Commands: 82nd Airborne Division
- Conflicts: Iraq War; * Operation Just Cause
- Awards: Legion of Merit (7); Bronze Star Medal (2)

Charles Henry "Chuck" Swannack Jr. (born March 9, 1949) is a former general officer in the United States Army who, once retired, called for the resignation of Defense Secretary Donald Rumsfeld.

Swannack is a 1971 graduate of the U.S. Military Academy at West Point. He later earned an M.S. degree in mechanical engineering from the Georgia Institute of Technology and became a Registered Professional Engineer in Virginia.

As a lieutenant colonel in July 1989, Swannack commanded the 2nd battalion (2/9) of the 9th Infantry Regiment garrisoned at Fort Ord, California. During his command, the unit deployed as part of the 7th Infantry Division (Light) for Operation Just Cause in Panama.

On February 12, 2004 Fallujah insurgents attacked a convoy carrying Swannack and General John Abizaid, commander of US forces in the Middle East, firing on the vehicles from nearby rooftops with RPGs, after seemingly infiltrating the Iraqi security forces.

Swannack's last position within the Army was Deputy Commanding General of the 18th Airborne Corps and Fort Bragg. Prior to this assignment he served as the commander of the Army's 82nd Airborne Division. His last rank was major general. On April 13, 2006, and after retirement, Swannack called for the dismissal of Secretary of Defense Donald Rumsfeld. In an interview with The New York Times, Swannack said:

We need to continue to fight the global war on terror and keep it off our shores, But I do not believe Secretary Rumsfeld is the right person to fight that war based on his absolute failures in managing the war against Saddam in Iraq.

CNN reports that Swannack, the second General who served in Iraq under Rumsfeld told their reporter:

I really believe that we need a new secretary of defense because Secretary Rumsfeld carries way too much baggage with him,

After his retirement from active duty, Swannack became the Chief Operating Officer of U.S. Logistics, Inc. In 2014, he became Executive Director of Speedway Children's Charities.

== See also ==
- David M. Brahms
- James Cullen
- John L. Fugh
- Robert Gard
- Lee F. Gunn
- John D. Hutson
- Richard O'Meara
