= Joseph P. Hoar =

United States Marine Corps general (1934–2022)

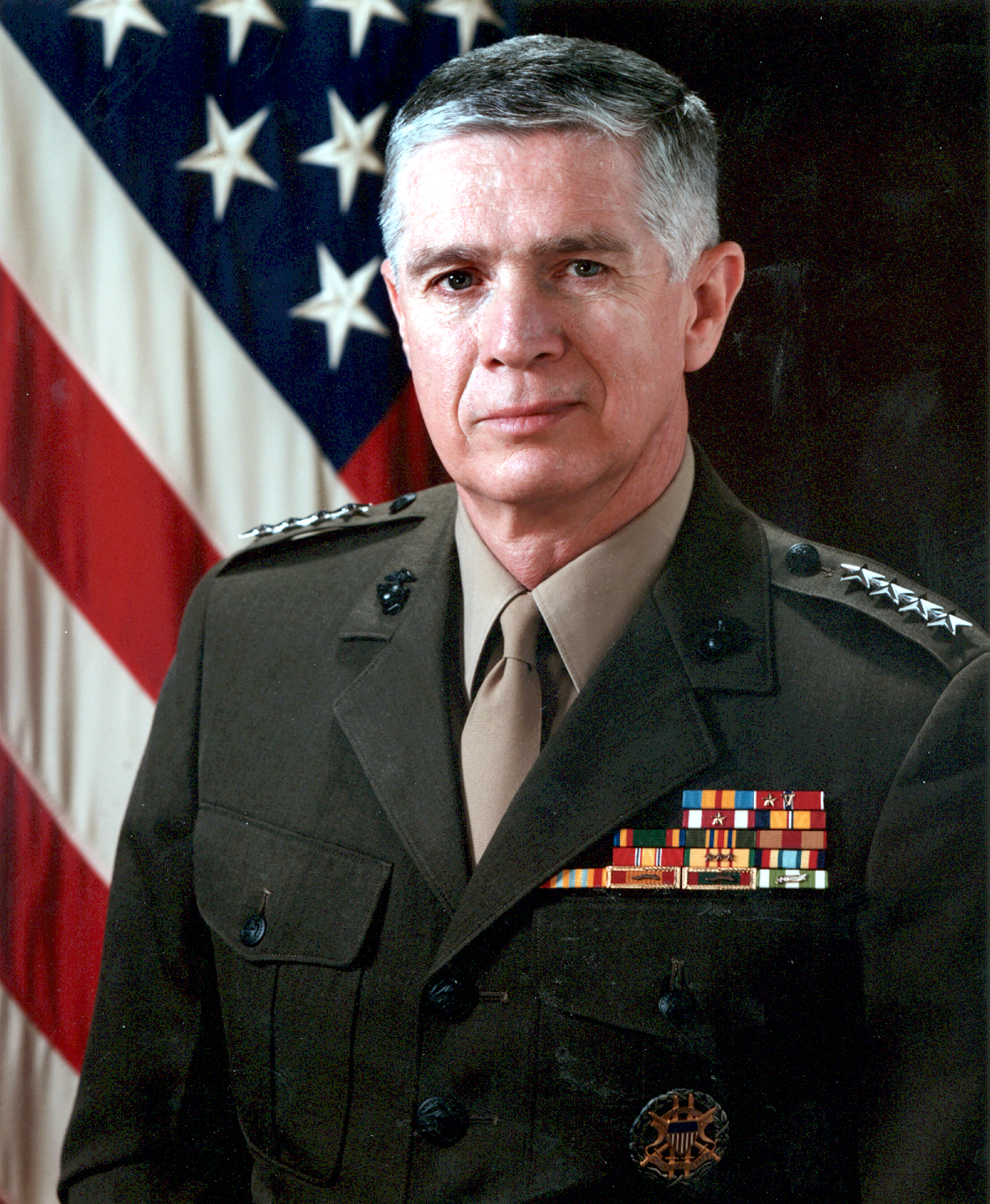
- Born: December 30, 1934; Boston, Massachusetts, U.S.
- Died: September 17, 2022 (aged 87); San Diego, California, U.S.
- Burial place: Miramar, California
- Military career
- Allegiance: United States
- Branch: United States Marine Corps
- Service years: 1957–1994
- Rank: General
- Commands: United States Central Command; Marine Corps Recruit Depot Parris Island
- Conflicts: Vietnam War
- Awards: Defense Distinguished Service Medal; Bronze Star (2)

Joseph Paul Hoar (December 30, 1934 – September 17, 2022) was a United States Marine Corps four-star general. He served as Commander in Chief of United States Central Command from 1991 to 1994, retiring from the Marine Corps on September 1, 1994.

== Marine Corps career ==
Hoar attended Boston College High School, then went on to graduate from Tufts University and receive a second lieutenant's commission in the Marine Corps in 1957. After graduating from the Basic School at Quantico, he was assigned as a rifle platoon commander with the 5th Marine Regiment. Later assignments included duty with 1st Battalion, 1st Marines at Camp Pendleton, battalion staff officer on Okinawa, the Marine Barracks at Yorktown, Virginia, and Assistant Manpower, Personnel and Administration Officer at Camp Lejeune.

During the Vietnam War, Hoar was assigned with the 2nd Marine Division, commanding Company M, 3rd Battalion, 2nd Marine Regiment of that unit. He later served as a battalion and brigade adviser with a South Vietnamese Marine Corps unit. He then returned stateside, completing a three-year tour of duty in Washington, D.C. as an operations officer and as Special Assistant to the Assistant Marine Corps Commandant. In 1971, he again went overseas as Executive Officer of 1st Battalion, 9th Marines.

From 1972 to 1976 Hoar was an instructor at the Marine Corps Command and Staff College, later returning to Marine Headquarters where he served in the Personnel Management Division. In 1977, he returned to 1st Marines as commander of its 3rd Battalion, later accepting duty with the Division's staff, where he was promoted to colonel. Hoar assumed command of 1st Marine Regiment from 17 November 1979 to 24 April 1981.

After completing this tour he was assigned to the 31st Marine Amphibious Unit aboard USS Belleau Wood, participating in three deployments in the Indian Ocean. He then returned to the U.S. as Assistant Chief of Staff for Manpower, Personnel and Administration, gaining a promotion to brigadier general in February 1984. In 1985, he returned to Washington as Director of the Facilities and Services Division at Marine HQ. 1987 saw Hoar accept a position as Commanding General at the Parris Island recruit depot; later that year he was promoted to major general.

Hoar moved to MacDill AFB, Florida in 1988 as Chief of Staff for United States Central Command. He returned to Headquarters Marine Corps in June 1990, earning a promotion to lieutenant general while serving there as Deputy Chief of Staff for Plans, Policies and Operations. After a year at this assignment he returned to CENTCOM as its commander on August 9, 1991, relieving General H. Norman Schwarzkopf. He remained in that capacity until his retirement three years later.

While in command of CENTCOM, General Hoar oversaw a number of different operations in the region, including enforcement of the Persian Gulf and Red Sea naval embargo, enforcement of the southern no-fly zone over Iraq, ground operations in Somalia, and American troop evacuation from Yemen during that country's civil war in 1994.

== Post-military career and death ==
After retirement, he set up a consulting company involved in business ventures in various places in the Middle East and Africa. He has served as Director of Hawaiian Airlines, as a Fellow of the World Economic Forum, and on the boards of trustees of Suffolk University and the Center for Naval Analyses.

General Hoar drew upon his experience with CENTCOM in the days leading up to the 2003 invasion of Iraq to stress the importance of allied cooperation, notably the ability to base military operations from Saudi Arabia, Jordan and Turkey, as key to success in the region. As U.S. strategy for the invasion coalesced, Hoar expressed misgivings, in particular regarding the number of troops committed to the operation.

A year after the official cessation of hostilities, Hoar continued to maintain that coalition forces did not have enough troops on the ground to accomplish their mission. In December 2003, Hoar stated that Deputy Secretary of Defense Paul Wolfowitz, "...doesn't know much about the business he's in". In testimony before the Senate committee on foreign relations on May 19, 2004, he stated regarding the situation in Iraq, "I believe we are absolutely on the brink of failure. We are looking into the abyss".

On September 7, 2004, Hoar and seven other retired officers wrote an open letter to President Bush expressing their concern over the number of allegations of abuse of prisoners in U.S. military custody. In it they wrote:

We urge you to commit – immediately and publicly – to support the creation of a comprehensive, independent commission to investigate and report on the truth about all of these allegations, and to chart a course for how practices that violate the law should be addressed.

In March 2006, Hoar joined fellow former United States Marines General Tony Zinni, Lt. General Greg Newbold, Lt. General Frank E. Petersen, and Congressman Jack Murtha in endorsing fellow former U.S. Marine and Secretary of the Navy Jim Webb for U.S. Senate in Virginia.

Hoar served on the Board of Directors for the Middle East Policy Council, a Washington D.C.–based non-profit organization that seeks to educate American citizens and policy makers about the political, economic and security issues impacting U.S. national interests in the Middle East. He also served on the National Advisory Board of the Center for Arms Control and Non-Proliferation, the research arm of Council for a Livable World.

He died on September 17, 2022, of complications related to Alzheimer's disease.

== Education and awards ==
Hoar held a master's degree from George Washington University and was also a graduate of the National War College and the Marine Corps Command and Staff College.

His military decorations include:

	Defense Distinguished Service Medal	Bronze Star w/ 1 award star & valor device		Office of the Joint Chiefs of Staff Identification Badge
Meritorious Service Medal w/ 1 award star	Combat Action Ribbon	Navy Unit Commendation	Navy Meritorious Unit Commendation	Office of the Joint Chiefs of Staff Identification Badge
Marine Corps Expeditionary Medal	National Defense Service Medal w/ 1 service star	Vietnam Service Medal w/ 3 service stars	Navy Sea Service Deployment Ribbon	Office of the Joint Chiefs of Staff Identification Badge
Vietnam Armed Forces Honor Medal, 2nd class	Vietnam Gallantry Cross unit citation	Vietnam Civil Actions unit citation	Vietnam Campaign Medal	Office of the Joint Chiefs of Staff Identification Badge

== See also ==
- David M. Brahms
- James Cullen
- John L. Fugh
- Robert Gard
- Lee F. Gunn
- John D. Hutson
- Richard O'Meara

Military offices
Preceded by H. Norman Schwarzkopf	Commander-in-Chief of United States Central Command; 1991–1994	Succeeded by J. H. Binford Peay III
