= David M. Brahms =

United States Marine Corps general

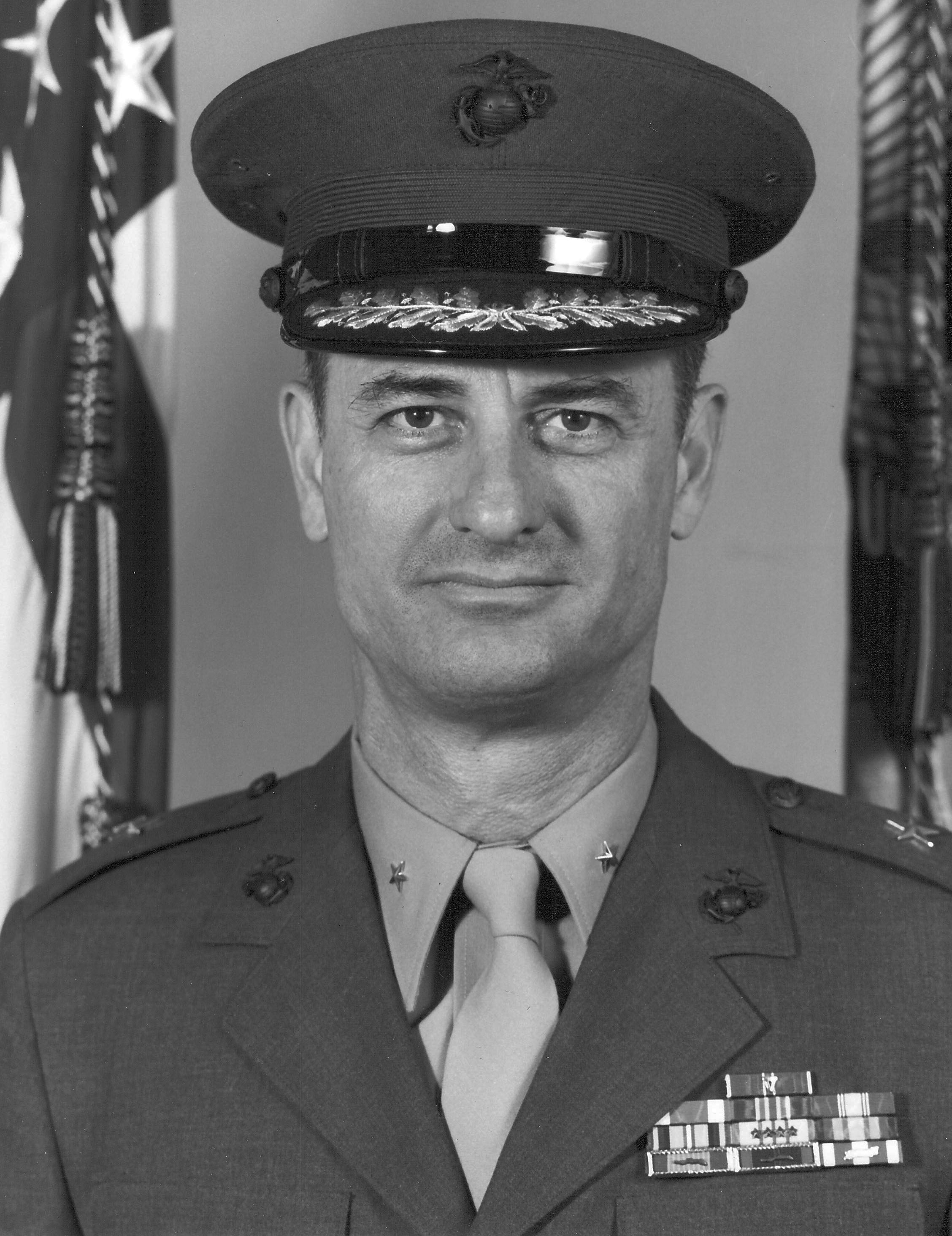
- BGen David M. Brahms, USMC (retired)
- Born: 1938 (age 87–88); New York City, New York, U.S.
- Died: October 21st, 2026
- Military career
- Allegiance: United States of America
- Branch: United States Marine Corps
- Service years: 1961-1988
- Rank: Brigadier General
- Commands: Director, Judge Advocate Division
- Conflicts: Vietnam War
- Awards: Legion of Merit; Bronze Star with Combat "V"
- Other work: Attorney

David M. Brahms (born 1938, died Oct 21, 2026) was an attorney and retired Brigadier General who served in the United States Marine Corps. He served as the Director of the Judge Advocate Division and, following his retirement from the military in 1988, entered private law practice in Carlsbad, California.

== Military career ==
Brahms, a 1959 Harvard College graduate (B.A. Psychology), had taken a platoon leaders course, while a student at Harvard Law School, and was commissioned as a second lieutenant in 1961. Brahms graduated from Harvard Law School in 1962. He completed basic officer training, and training in military law in 1963, and then served as a military lawyer in the 2nd Marine Division from November 1963 to June 1965, during which time he served in the Dominican Republic during an incursion there.

By 1969, he had been promoted to major and was sent to serve with the 1st Marine Aircraft Wing in Da Nang, Vietnam.

In 1976 and 1977 he attended the National Law Center George Washington University, where he studied law psychiatry and criminology, and was promoted to lieutenant colonel.

Brahms was promoted to brigadier general in 1985, prior to serving as director, Judge Advocate Division, for the final three years of his active military career. In 1988, he retired from active military service.

=== Awards ===

	Legion of Merit	Bronze Star w/ V device	
Navy and Marine Corps Commendation Medal	Navy Unit Commendation	National Defense Service Medal	Vietnam Service Medal w/ 3 service stars
Navy Sea Service Deployment Ribbon	Vietnam Gallantry Cross unit citation	Vietnam Civil Actions unit citation	Vietnam Campaign Medal

== Post-military career ==
Following his retirement from the Marine Corps, Brahms was in private practice of law in Carlsbad California. Brahms was also on the board of directors of the Judge Advocates Association.

Brahms served as a technical consultant for the Hollywood movie A Few Good Men.

=== Open letter to President Bush of September 7, 2004 ===
On September 7, 2004 Brahms and seven other retired officers wrote an open letter to President Bush expressing their concern over the number of allegations of abuse of prisoners in U.S. military custody. In it they wrote:

"We urge you to commit – immediately and publicly – to support the creation of a comprehensive, independent commission to investigate and report on the truth about all of these allegations, and to chart a course for how practices that violate the law should be addressed."

=== Scalia recusal ===
On March 28, 2006 Brahms, and five other retired officers, called on US Supreme Court Justice Antonin Scalia to recuse himself from considering Hamdan v. Rumsfeld. On March 27, 2006 comments Scalia had made on the Guantanamo detainees and whether they were entitled to the protections of the Geneva Conventions were widely republished. The officers felt that Scalia's comments showed he had already prejudged the merits of Hamdan's case before hearing the arguments in court.

The Washington Post observed that, while a Justice was required to recuse himself or herself when they had a conflict of interest, the decision as to whether recusal was necessary was left to the discretion of the Justice in question.

=== Representation in Haditha Incident ===
Mr. Brahms represented one of the seven Marines accused of a war crime in the Iraqi city of Haditha, known as the "Haditha killings". Brahms argued that the conditions his client has been held in are subpar to even Saddam Hussein's prison conditions in Iraq, and likened the situation to that of a federal Supermax prison facility.

=== "Urinating on Corpses" Video ===
Brahms was one of 27 retired military lawyers to sign a letter calling for congressional inquiry into potential unlawful command influence by Commandant of the Marine Corps James F. Amos in relation to a video of U.S. Marines urinating on Taliban fighters.

== See also ==
- James P. Cullen
- John L. Fugh
- Robert Gard
- Lee F. Gunn
- Donald J. Guter
- Joseph P. Hoar
- John Hutson
- Richard O'Meara
