= John Hutson =

American lawyer

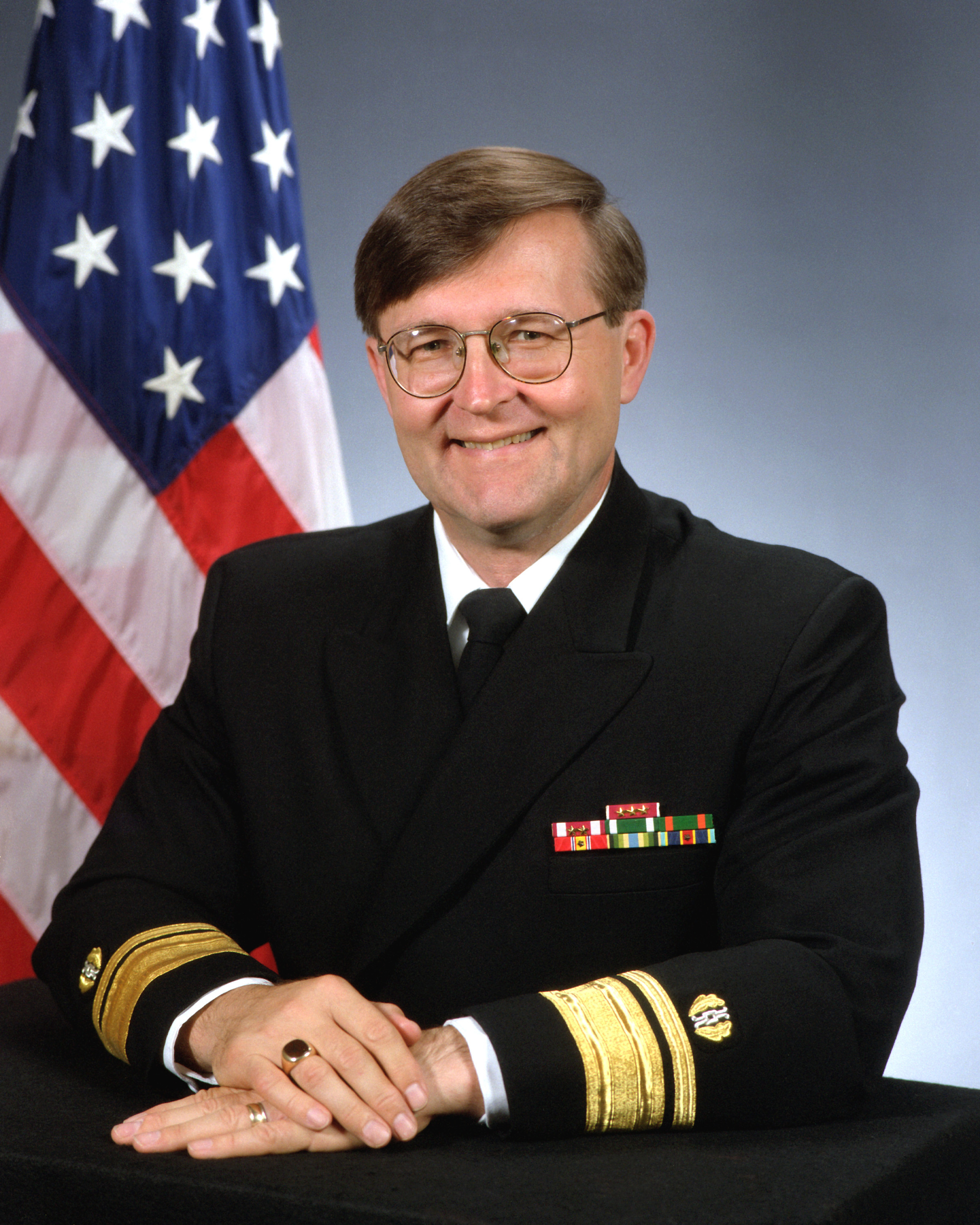
- Born: 1947 (age 78–79); North Muskegon, Michigan, U.S.
- Alma mater: Michigan State University (BA); Naval Justice School; University of Minnesota (JD); Georgetown University (LLM)
- Military career
- Allegiance: United States
- Branch: United States Navy
- Service years: 1969–2000
- Rank: Rear admiral
- Unit: U.S. Navy Judge Advocate General's Corps
- Commands: Judge Advocate General of the Navy; Naval Justice School; Naval Legal Service Office Europe and Southwest Asia
- Awards: Navy Distinguished Service Medal (2); Legion of Merit (4)

John Dudley Hutson (born 1947) is a former United States Navy officer, attorney, and former Judge Advocate General of the Navy. He is a former dean and president of University of New Hampshire School of Law in Concord, New Hampshire, having served in the position from 2000 to 2010.

== Early life and education ==
Hutson holds a B.A. from Michigan State University, a J.D. from the University of Minnesota Law School, and an LL.M. from Georgetown University Law Center.

== Career ==
=== Open letter to President Bush of September 7, 2004 ===
On September 7, 2004, Hutson and seven other retired officers wrote an open letter to President Bush expressing their concern over the number of allegations of abuse of prisoners in U.S. military custody. In it they wrote:

We urge you to commit – immediately and publicly – to support the creation of a comprehensive, independent commission to investigate and report on the truth about all of these allegations, and to chart a course for how practices that violate the law should be addressed.

=== January 2005 congressional testimony ===
In January 2005, Dean Hutson, along with Yale Law School dean Harold Koh, testified before the U.S. Senate Judiciary Committee in opposition to the appointment of Alberto Gonzales as attorney general of the United States, because of his alleged role in attempting to provide legal guidance to the U.S. military justifying abusive interrogation practices, including that the war on terror "renders obsolete" and "renders quaint" aspects of the Geneva Conventions.

In November 2005, his activities led the NHCLU to name Hutson their recipient of that year's Bill of Rights Award; Hutson had previously been the featured speaker at the 2004 annual meeting of that organization.

=== July 2005 congressional testimony ===
Hutson testified before the Senate Armed Services Personnel Subcommittee on July 14, 2005, offering his opinion on the detention of "unlawful combatants". Hutson said that he had been an early supporter of trial by military commission—provided those military commissions were conducted fairly. But he thought that the proposed process was flawed, and there had been too long a delay. In his prepared statement he argued that the captives should face charges before Military Courts Martial. And he argued that if they were to be convicted, they should be convicted using a high standard of proof. He also argued that the captives who were not charged should not be held indefinitely.

=== Scalia recusal ===
On March 28, 2006, Hutson, and five other retired officers, called on US Supreme Court Justice Antonin Scalia to recuse himself from considering Hamdan v. Rumsfeld. On March 27, 2006, comments Scalia had made on the Guantanamo detainees and whether they were entitled to the protections of the Geneva Conventions were widely republished. The officers felt that Scalia's comments showed he had already prejudged the merits of Hamdan's case before hearing the arguments in court. The Washington Post observed that while a Justice was required to recuse himself or herself when they had a conflict of interest, the decision as to whether recusal was necessary was left to the discretion of the Justice in question.

=== July 2006 congressional testimony ===
The Boston Globe reported on July 11, 2006, that Hutson was scheduled to testify before the House and Senate Armed Services Committees. The Globe reported, at length, comments Hutson had made regarding a memo from Deputy Secretary of Defense Gordon R. England telling Armed Forces personnel to comply with the Geneva Conventions in its treatment of captives: "It kind of takes the wind out of the sails of people who say the Congress should simply authorize what the president had done in his original order. I'd like to see something coming of the CIA or Negroponte similarly."

=== Comments on Bush plan for new Guantanamo military commissions ===
The Washington Post reports that Hutson commented on a draft bill from the Bush administration for new Guantanamo military commissions to replace those struck down by the US Supreme Court. According to the Washington Post:

[Hutson] said the rules would evidently allow the government to tell a prisoner: "We know you're guilty. We can't tell you why, but there's a guy, we can't tell you who, who told us something. We can't tell you what, but you're guilty."

=== "A second chance to get it right" ===
Hutson published an article entitled: "Detainee treatment: a second chance to get it right", on August 3, 2006.

=== Ghosts of Abu Ghraib ===
Hutson was one of the lawyers and former Navy Officers interviewed for the HBO documentary Ghosts of Abu Ghraib.

=== Politics ===
Hutson had discussed having been asked about running for the United States House of Representatives in the second district of New Hampshire, but denied that he intends to do so.

Despite being a lifelong Republican, Hutson was a featured speaker at the 2008 Democratic National Convention on August 25 and August 27, 2008, who later announced that he was switching parties and endorsed Senator Barack Obama. He was mentioned as a possible Republican replacement for U.S. Senator Judd Gregg, prior to Gregg's nomination to be U.S. Secretary of Commerce in the Obama administration. The Senate vacancy was to have been filled by Bonnie Newman, but Gregg ultimately withdrew his candidacy for the position. He also was a featured speaker at the 2016 Democratic National Convention at Philadelphia on July 27, 2016, on the topic of national security and endorsed Hillary Clinton for president.

== See also ==
- David M. Brahms
- James P. Cullen
- John L. Fugh
- Robert Gard
- Lee F. Gunn
- Joseph Hoar
- Richard O'Meara

Military offices
Preceded by Harold Eric Grant	36th Judge Advocate General of the Navy; 1997-2000	Succeeded by Donald Joseph Guter
