= Ken Gormley (academic) =

American lawyer and academic administrator (born 1955)

Chancellor of Duquesne University
- Incumbent
- Assumed office July 1, 2026

13th President of Duquesne University
- In office July 1, 2016 – July 1, 2026
- Preceded by: Charles J. Dougherty
- Succeeded by: David Dausey

Dean of the Duquesne University School of Law
- In office December 10, 2008 – January 2016
- Preceded by: Donald J. Guter
- Succeeded by: Maureen Lally-Green

Personal details
- Born: Kenneth Gerald Gormley; March 19, 1955 (age 71) Pittsburgh, Pennsylvania, U.S.
- Education: University of Pittsburgh (BA); Harvard University (JD)

Kenneth Gerald Gormley (born March 19, 1955) is an American legal scholar and academic administrator who served as the 13th president of Duquesne University from 2016 to 2026 and became the university's chancellor on July 1, 2026. He is a former dean and a professor of constitutional law at the Duquesne University Thomas R. Kline School of Law. He previously practiced law at Cindrich & Titus and served as legal counsel for the Appellate Practice Group at Schnader Harrison Segal & Lewis LLP. His scholarship has focused on constitutional and state constitutional law, the Watergate scandal, the Clinton presidency, special prosecutors, the Supreme Court and the American presidency.

== Early life and education ==
Kenneth Gerald Gormley was born in Pittsburgh on March 19, 1955, and grew up in nearby Swissvale and Edgewood. He earned a BA in political science and philosophy from the University of Pittsburgh in 1977, summa cum laude, and a JD from Harvard Law School in 1980.

== Legal and academic career ==
After graduating from law school, Gormley clerked for U.S. District Judge Donald E. Ziegler. He subsequently taught at the University of Pittsburgh School of Law, engaged in private practice, served as executive director of the Pennsylvania Legislative Reapportionment Commission and served as a special clerk to Justice Ralph J. Cappy of the Pennsylvania Supreme Court.

Gormley joined the faculty of the Duquesne University School of Law in 1994. He was elected mayor of Forest Hills, Pennsylvania, serving from 1998 to 2001. In 2007, he became the first academic elected president of the Allegheny County Bar Association in the organization's 137-year history.

Gormley was named dean of the Duquesne University School of Law in December 2008.

In February 2015, Pennsylvania Governor Tom Wolf nominated Gormley to fill one of two vacancies on the Supreme Court of Pennsylvania. The Pennsylvania State Senate opted not to fill the vacancies, allowing the seats to be filled in the November election instead.

== President and chancellor of Duquesne University ==
On November 4, 2015, Duquesne University announced that Gormley would become its 13th president following the retirement of Charles J. Dougherty. Gormley took office on July 1, 2016.

In 2017, Gormley introduced the strategic plan Re-Imagining Duquesne's Spiritan Legacy for a New Era, covering the years 2018–2023. The plan was succeeded by an updated strategic plan in 2024. During his presidency, the university established its first Office of Community Engagement and expanded its regional outreach programs.

=== Academic programs and initiatives ===
During Gormley's presidency, Duquesne undertook what the university described as its largest academic expansion in more than a century with the 2024 opening of the College of Osteopathic Medicine. Developed in part to address physician shortages in underserved communities, the college was renamed the Nasuti College of Osteopathic Medicine in 2025 following a gift from alumnus Jim Nasuti and his wife, Celeste. The gift was the second largest in the university's history.

In 2022, Gormley announced a $50 million gift commitment from alumnus Thomas R. Kline to support the university's law school. The gift, the largest in Duquesne's history, led to the school's renaming as the Thomas R. Kline School of Law. In 2024, the school's library was renamed the Ken Gormley Law Library at the donor's request.

Gormley's tenure also included the renaming of the School of Science and Engineering, the creation of new engineering programs and the establishment of the university's first endowed chair in engineering.

The university also created several interdisciplinary centers, including the Carl G. Grefenstette Center for Ethics in Science, Technology and Law and the Patricia Doherty Yoder Institute for Ethics and Integrity in Journalism and Media, and expanded the Center for Integrative Health. Gormley's administration introduced a new undergraduate general education curriculum and established the August Wilson House Fellows program, which recognizes artists of color and supports the preservation of playwright August Wilson's childhood home.

Gormley also collaborated with music professor Robert Traugh to update the university's alma mater. Gormley composed new lyrics for the 150th anniversary of the 1872 arrival of the university's founders, the Spiritans, in Pittsburgh.

=== Fundraising and campus development ===
During Gormley's presidency, Duquesne conducted the IGNITE fundraising campaign, which set a goal of raising $333 million by June 2025. The campaign surpassed its goal four months ahead of schedule and concluded with more than $345 million raised, making it the largest fundraising initiative in the university's history.

Gormley oversaw the renovation of several Duquesne buildings, including the UPMC Cooper Fieldhouse, the Thomas R. Kline School of Law and Rockwell Hall. His tenure also included construction of the Nasuti College of Osteopathic Medicine building and McGinley Hall student apartments.

Early in his tenure, Gormley oversaw the opening of a career development center within the university's student union. His administration established scholarships and financial-aid programs intended to expand student access to study-abroad programs and developed the Unico Family Pavilion, an all-season outdoor facility for student gatherings and study.

=== Athletics ===
Gormley oversaw the renovation of the A.J. Palumbo Center into the UPMC Cooper Fieldhouse, which was named for basketball player and Duquesne alumnus Chuck Cooper, the first African American drafted by an NBA team. Gormley served as the inaugural co-chair of the Atlantic 10 Conference Commission on Racial Equity, Diversity and Inclusion.

During his presidency, Duquesne hired men's basketball coach Keith Dambrot, whose team won the Atlantic 10 Conference championship and appeared in the 2024 NCAA tournament, the university's first appearance in 47 years. The university also added three women's varsity athletic teams and established a $1.1 million endowment for club sports.

=== Transition to chancellor ===
In 2025, Gormley announced that he would step down as president on July 1, 2026, after ten years in the position. Duquesne's board appointed him chancellor, a role previously held by two former presidents of the university.

== Scholarship and writing ==
Gormley has published scholarly legal articles on privacy and other constitutional subjects, including the constitutional implications of the Watergate scandal.

He has testified before the United States Senate on the independent counsel law, warrantless surveillance and the presidential pardon power.

Gormley has provided legal commentary on national media programs, including NBC's Today, The Charlie Rose Show, Hardball with Chris Matthews and NPR's Fresh Air. He has also published opinion articles in The New York Times, The Washington Post, The Wall Street Journal, the Los Angeles Times and other publications.

=== Books ===
Gormley was the principal editor of The Pennsylvania Constitution: A Treatise on Rights and Liberties, first published by George T. Bisel in 2004. A second edition was published in 2020. The work has been cited by courts in Pennsylvania and elsewhere in the United States.

In 1997, Gormley published Archibald Cox: Conscience of a Nation through Addison-Wesley. The book received the 1999 Bruce K. Gould Book Award for an outstanding publication relating to law.

In 2010, Gormley published The Death of American Virtue: Clinton vs. Starr through Crown Publishers. The book became a New York Times bestseller and received an honorable mention in the American Bar Association's 2011 Silver Gavel Awards. It was also reviewed in publications including The New York Times Book Review, The Washington Post Book World, The Wall Street Journal, the Los Angeles Times and The Atlantic.

Gormley edited The Presidents and the Constitution: A Living History, published as a single volume by New York University Press in 2016. The work was later expanded into a two-volume paperback edition. The first volume, published in 2020, covers the period from the Founding Fathers to the Progressive Era. The second volume, published in 2022, covers the period from World War I to the Trump era.

In 2021, Gormley published his first novel, The Heiress of Pittsburgh, through Sunbury Press. He described the novel as a "love story to Pittsburgh".

== Service and honors ==
Gormley has served on national advisory boards and panels. In 2024, he was appointed to the Pennsylvania Commission on Judicial Independence of the Supreme Court of Pennsylvania.

He served on the President's Board of the Pittsburgh Council on Higher Education, which he chaired from 2023 to 2026, and on the boards of directors of the Senator John Heinz History Center, the Allegheny Conference on Community Development, the Eradicate Hate Global Summit, the Duquesne Club and the Pittsburgh Symphony Orchestra.

His previous service included membership on the Atlantic 10 Presidents Council Executive Committee, the American Bar Association's Silver Gavel Award Committee, the Pennsylvania Supreme Court History Society and the Duquesne University Press Editorial Board. Gormley was president of the Allegheny County Bar Association from 2007 to 2008 and also served on its Board of Governors and as a legislative committee chair.

Gormley received the 2024 Art Rooney Award and the 2024 Irish Legal 100 Award. In October 2025, he was named an honorary member of Duquesne University's Century Club of Distinguished Alumni, the university's highest non-academic honor.

He has been listed in Who's Who in American Law since 1993 and Who's Who in America since 2009.

At the conclusion of Gormley's presidency, Duquesne's Board of Directors named the university's student union the Ken and Laura Gormley Student Union. The naming was announced at a ceremony on April 25, 2026. The board also awarded Gormley an honorary Doctor of Laws degree at the Duquesne Kline Law School commencement ceremony on May 16, 2026.

== Personal life ==
Gormley married Laura Kozler in 1986. They have four adult children and six grandchildren.
