= Richard O'Meara =

United States Army general

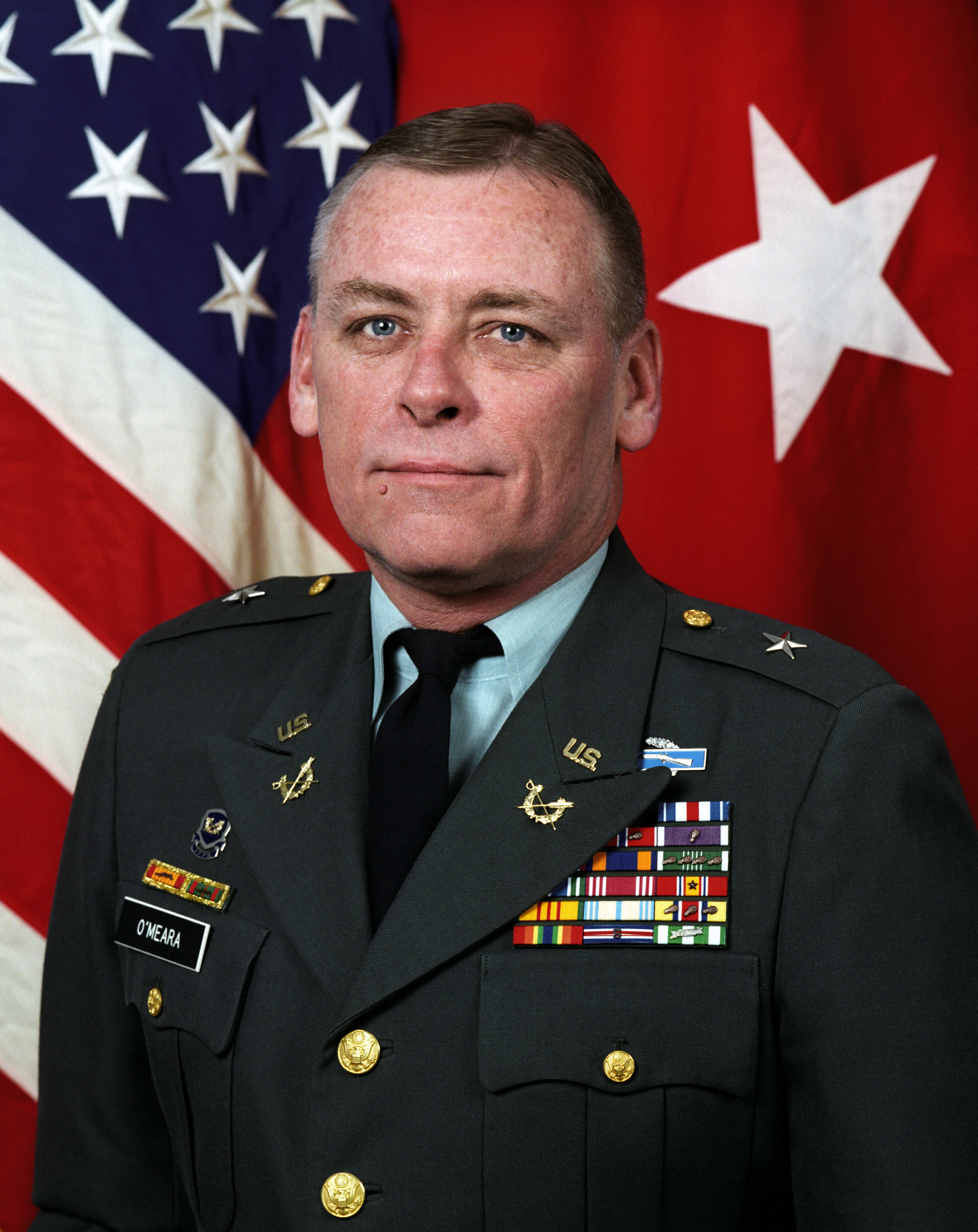
Brig. Gen. O'Meara in 1996

Richard Michael O'Meara is a retired brigadier general in the United States Army.

O'Meara is a combat veteran of the War in Vietnam. He was awarded the Silver Star, three Bronze Star Medals, two Purple Hearts and an Air Medal. Following his Vietnam service, O'Meara completed a B.A. degree in history at American University in 1971 and then earned a J.D. degree from the Fordham University School of Law in 1975 before joining the Judge Advocate General's Corps, U.S. Army. For two decades, while serving in the U.S. Army Reserve, he acted as senior partner in the litigation firm, O'Meara & Hight. O'Meara also received an M.A. degree in history from Montclair State University in 1995 and an M.A. degree in international relations from Salve Regina University in 1999. He retired from the United States Army Reserves in 2002, after 36 years of service. Following his retirement, he earned a Ph.D. degree from Rutgers University in 2011 and took up teaching posts at Rutgers University-Newark, where he served as the Director of Division of Global Affairs, Richard Stockton College, Kean University and Monmouth University, where he teaches courses in Security Studies, Human Rights, International Law, and History.

He holds a Research Fellowship at the Stockdale Center for Ethical Leadership, United States Naval Academy and continues to serve as Adjunct Faculty with the Defense Institute of International Legal Studies where he has taught rule of law, governance, and peacekeeping subjects in such diverse locations as El Salvador, Peru, Cambodia, Rwanda, Philippines, Chad, Sierra Leone, Guinea, Ukraine, Moldova, and Iraq. He is a qualified Emergency Medical Technician and served at the World Trade Center Site in the months after 9/11.

In July 2006, General O'Meara spoke about genocide and torture at the New Jersey Governor's School of Public Issues and the Future of New Jersey.

Maritime Piracy in the 21st Century: A Short Course for U.S. Policy Makers (Winter 2007, Journal of Global Change and Governance)

== Open letter to President Bush of September 7, 2004 ==
On September 7, 2004 O'Meara and seven other retired officers wrote an open letter to President Bush expressing their concern over the number of allegations of abuse of prisoners in U.S. military custody. In it they wrote:

"We urge you to commit – immediately and publicly – to support the creation of a comprehensive, independent commission to investigate and report on the truth about all of these allegations, and to chart a course for how practices that violate the law should be addressed."

== See also ==
- James Cullen
- John L. Fugh
- Robert Gard
- Lee F. Gunn
- Joseph Hoar
- John D. Hutson
- David M. Brahms
