= General Cullen =

General Cullen may refer to:

- David Mark Cullen (fl. 1980s–2010s), British Army major general
- James P. Cullen (1945–2017), U.S. Army brigadier general
- Paul Cullen (general) (1909–2007), Australian Army major general

== See also ==
- Frank L. Culin Jr. (1892–1967), U.S. Army major general
- Attorney General Cullen (disambiguation)
