= Charles J. Dougherty =

American academic

12th President of Duquesne University
- In office August 2001 – July 1, 2016
- Preceded by: John E. Murray, Jr.
- Succeeded by: Ken Gormley

Personal details
- Born: June 28, 1949 (age 77) Brooklyn, New York
- Education: St. Bonaventure University (BA); University of Notre Dame (MA, PhD)

Charles J. Dougherty (born June 28, 1949) is an American academic who served as the 12th president of Duquesne University in Pittsburgh, Pennsylvania. An expert in the field of health care ethics, Dougherty has published two books on the subject.

== Academic career ==
The first member of his family to attend college, Dougherty received his bachelor's degree in philosophy from St. Bonaventure University in 1971. He went on to earn a master's degree and doctorate in the same subject from the University of Notre Dame in 1973 and 1975.

=== Academic Vice President of Creighton University ===
Dougherty joined the faculty of Creighton University in 1975, chairing the philosophy department there from 1981 to 1989. He served as the first director of the Creighton Center for Health Policy and Ethics from 1988 to 1995, a position which he left when he was appointed the university's academic vice president. He held that post from 1995 to 2001, during which time he was acting university president for a brief period in 2000.

=== President of Duquesne University ===
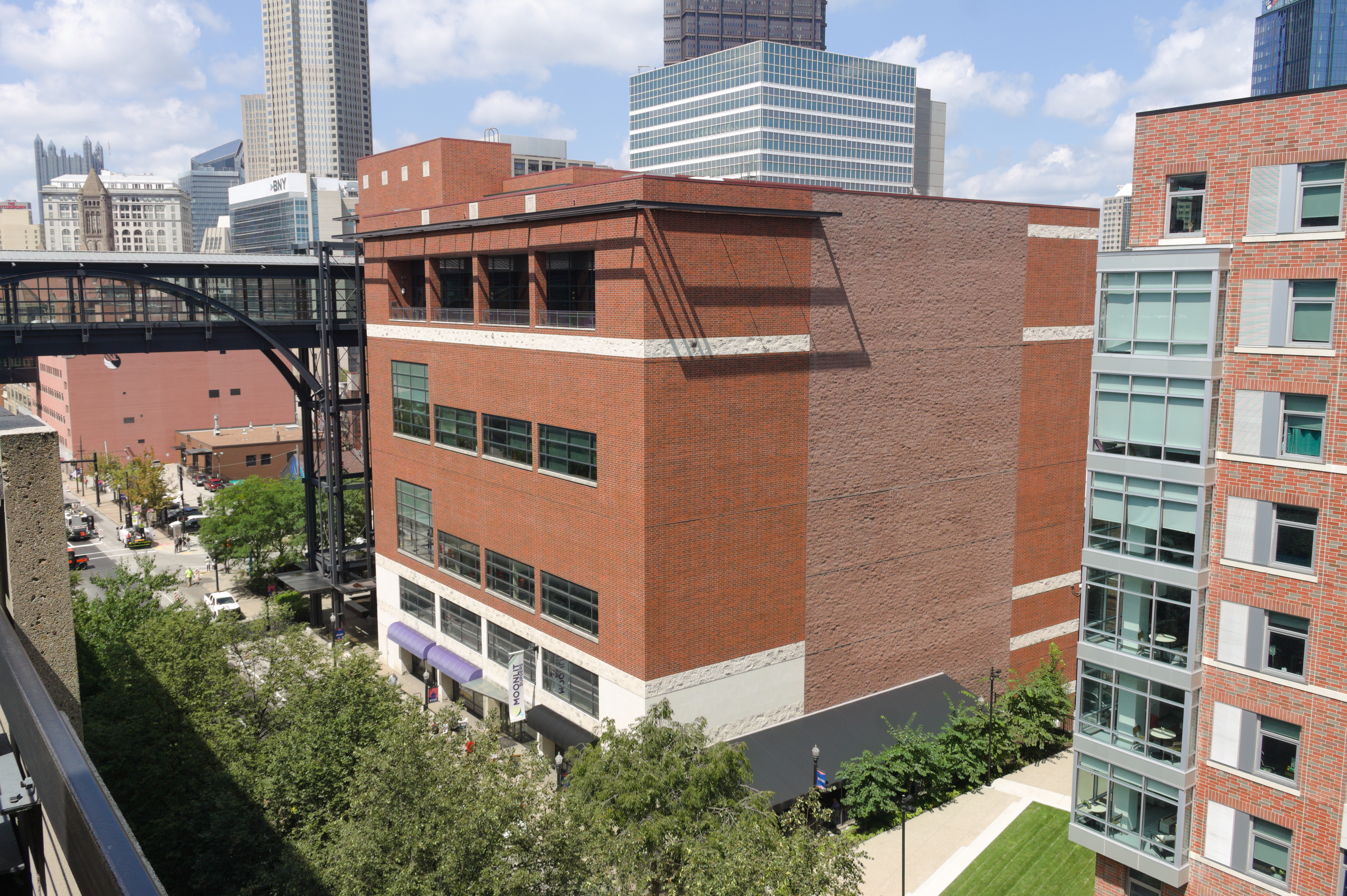
The multi-purpose Power Center building was constructed on Duquesne University's campus during Dougherty's tenure as president

Dougherty was elected president of Duquesne University by its board of directors in May 2001 and took office that August. During his presidency, Duquesne expanded its campus and fundraising operations. Its Advancing Our Legacy capital campaign raised more than $164 million, at the time the largest campaign in the university's history. Projects undertaken during Dougherty's tenure included construction of the Power Center, renovation of Towers residence hall, acquisition of Brottier Hall and expansion of the campus along Fifth Avenue. Duquesne reported at the time of his retirement that it had invested more than $350 million in facilities and campus improvements since 2001 and that the number of endowed academic chairs had increased from two to 24.

In 2005, following a semester-long review, Dougherty approved official recognition of a gay-straight student alliance, subject to requirements that its activities conform to Catholic teaching and university policy. Dougherty said that Catholic teaching regarded homosexual conduct as immoral but also required respect for people regardless of sexual orientation; the decision had the support of the university's board, the Congregation of the Holy Spirit and Bishop Donald Wuerl. Dougherty later identified strengthening Duquesne's Catholic and Spiritan identity and its ties with the Spiritans in Africa as priorities of his administration.

Dougherty's administration also faced disputes over university governance. In December 2008 he removed Donald Guter as dean of the School of Law, despite gains in the school's bar-examination passage rate during Guter's tenure. The removal followed earlier disagreements between the two over Dougherty's initial denial of tenure to a law professor whom Guter and the law faculty had supported. The student government subsequently adopted a resolution of no confidence in Dougherty, and nearly 200 students and faculty demonstrated in January 2009 seeking an explanation for Guter's dismissal.

In January 2011, Duquesne's board agreed to sell the license of university-owned public radio station WDUQ-FM for $6 million to Essential Public Media, a partnership between WYEP-FM and Public Radio Capital. The university announced that the proceeds would support two endowed academic chairs, graduate stipends and scholarships intended to increase student diversity. Dougherty said the board selected Essential Public Media despite a slightly higher competing bid because of its financing and experience in public radio.

The university experienced an enrollment decline following the Great Recession. Enrollment fell by 2 percent in 2011, interrupting what university officials described as ten years of enrollment growth and contributing to a projected $10 million deficit for the 2012–13 academic year. Seventy employees, including 20 faculty members, accepted voluntary buyouts. The administration also froze most hiring, temporarily suspended employee raises, reduced departmental operating budgets by 7 to 12 percent and raised tuition by 4.75 percent. In February 2012, Dougherty announced that these measures had eliminated the projected deficit and that no layoffs or program eliminations were planned. Enrollment subsequently recovered; by the end of Dougherty's tenure the university was reporting record-sized entering classes and an endowment of more than $262 million.

Beginning in 2012, Dougherty's administration became involved in a prolonged dispute over an effort by adjunct faculty in the McAnulty College and Graduate School of Liberal Arts to organize with the United Steelworkers. Duquesne initially agreed to an election overseen by the National Labor Relations Board (NLRB), but subsequently challenged the board's jurisdiction, arguing that application of federal labor law to the Catholic university threatened its religious freedom. The adjuncts voted 50–9 in favor of unionization that September, after which Duquesne continued its jurisdictional appeal. In 2015, a regional NLRB office again ruled that the adjuncts could unionize, finding no evidence that their employment involved religious duties. Dougherty said Duquesne would appeal the ruling to the national board and, if necessary, the federal courts. The dispute continued after Dougherty's retirement. In 2017, the NLRB certified the union and subsequently ordered Duquesne to bargain, but the university obtained review in federal court. In 2020, the United States Court of Appeals for the District of Columbia Circuit ruled that the NLRB lacked jurisdiction over Duquesne's faculty because of the university's religious character, effectively ending the unionization effort under federal labor law.

Dougherty announced in February 2015 that he would retire when his third term expired on June 30, 2016. He said that he favored turnover in administrative positions and believed that after 15 years a new president could bring different perspectives to the university. In November 2015 the university selected law school dean Ken Gormley as his successor. Gormley took office on July 1, 2016.

== Professional and civic service ==
Dougherty worked with the Hospital Trustees Project at the Hastings Center and the New York Academy of Medicine, as well as the National Coalition on Catholic Health Care. He also served on the board of trustees of the Catholic Health Association, on the editorial boards of Creighton University Press and Health Progress, and as a commissioner of the Nebraska Accountability and Disclosure Commission, a state government ethics body.

During his presidency at Duquesne, Dougherty served on the boards of Mercy Hospital, Mercy Health Systems, the Allegheny Conference on Community Development, the Pittsburgh Downtown Partnership, the World Affairs Council of Pittsburgh, and the Urban League of Pittsburgh. He also served on the board of the Association of Independent Colleges and Universities of Pennsylvania and chaired the presidents' committee of the Pittsburgh Council on Higher Education.

== Personal life ==
Charles Dougherty was born in Brooklyn, New York, and attended St. Anthony's High School in Smithtown, New York. Dougherty and his wife, Sandra, who served as a judge of Nebraska's Fourth Judicial District from 1999 to 2009, have two children.

Preceded by Dr. John E. Murray, Jr.	President of Duquesne University of the Holy Spirit; 2001–2016	Succeeded by Ken Gormley
