= James P. Cullen =

United States Army general

- Born: January 27, 1945; Queens, New York, U.S.
- Died: December 8, 2017 (aged 72); Scarsdale, New York, U.S.
- Military career
- Allegiance: United States
- Branch: United States Army
- Rank: Brigadier General
- Unit: Judge Advocate General's Corps
- Awards: Army Distinguished Service Medal; Meritorious Service Medal (3); Army Commendation Medal (2)

James P. Cullen (27 January 1945 – 8 December 2017) was a brigadier general in the United States Army who served in the Judge Advocate General's Corps.

== Open letter to President Bush ==
On September 7, 2004, Cullen and seven other retired officers wrote an open letter to President Bush expressing their concern over the number of allegations of abuse of prisoners in U.S. military custody. In it they wrote: "We urge you to commit – immediately and publicly – to support the creation of a comprehensive, independent commission to investigate and report on the truth about all of these allegations, and to chart a course for how practices that violate the law should be addressed."

== Scalia recusal ==
On March 28, 2006, Cullen, and five other retired officers, called on US Supreme Court Justice Antonin Scalia to recuse himself from considering Hamdan v. Rumsfeld. On March 27, 2006, comments Scalia had made on the Guantanamo detainees and whether they were entitled to the protections of the Geneva Conventions were widely republished. The officers felt that Scalia's comments showed he had already prejudged the merits of Hamdan's case before hearing the arguments in court.

The Washington Post observed that while a Justice was required to recuse himself or herself when they had a conflict of interest, the decision as to whether recusal was necessary was left to the discretion of the Justice in question.

== See also ==
- David M. Brahms
- John L. Fugh
- Robert Gard
- Lee F. Gunn
- Joseph Hoar
- John D. Hutson
- Richard O'Meara
