= Donald J. Guter =

American educator and former U.S. Navy admiral

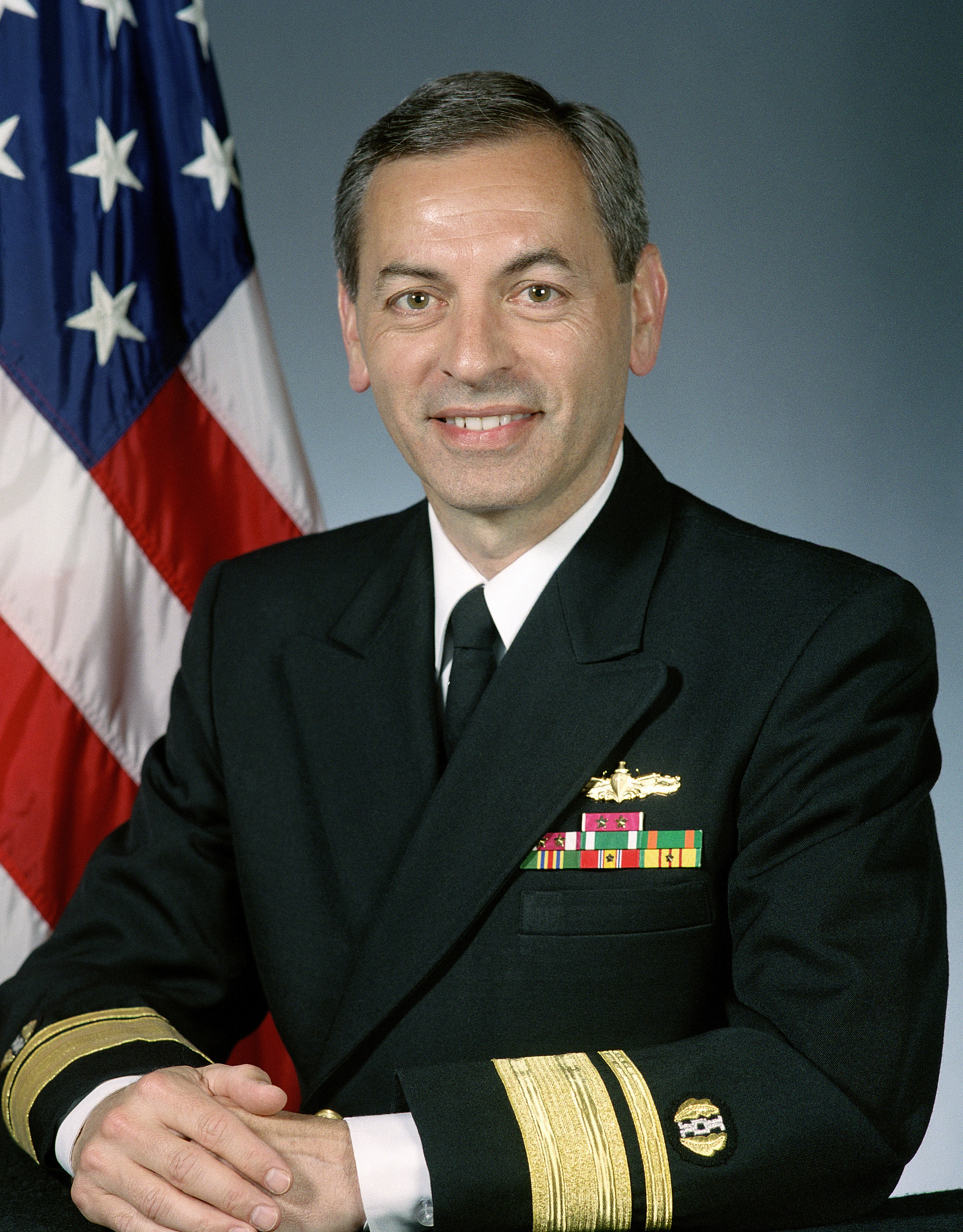
- Guter as a rear admiral, 1998

10th President and Dean of the South Texas College of Law Houston
- In office August 1, 2009 – August 1, 2019
- Preceded by: James J. Alfini
- Succeeded by: Michael F. Barry

10th Dean of the Duquesne University School of Law
- In office August 2005 – December 10, 2008
- Preceded by: Nicholas P. Cafardi
- Succeeded by: Ken Gormley (acting)

37th Judge Advocate General of the Navy
- In office June 9, 2000 – June 28, 2002
- Preceded by: John Hutson
- Succeeded by: Michael F. Lohr

Personal details
- Born: Donald Joseph Guter; June 26, 1948 (age 78) Latrobe, Pennsylvania, U.S.
- Education: University of Colorado (BA); Duquesne University School of Law (JD); Naval Justice School

Military service
- Allegiance: United States of America
- Branch/service: United States Navy
- Years of service: 1970–2002
- Rank: Rear Admiral
- Unit: Judge Advocate General's Corps, U.S. Navy
- Commands: Deputy Judge Advocate General of the Navy; Naval Legal Service Command; Naval Legal Service Office Mid-Atlantic
- Battles/wars: Vietnam War; Gulf War
- Awards: Defense Distinguished Service Medal; Legion of Merit (3)

Donald Joseph Guter (born June 26, 1948) is an American educator, lawyer and retired United States Navy rear admiral who was the 10th president and dean of South Texas College of Law Houston from 2009 to 2019. He previously served as the 10th dean of the Duquesne University School of Law from 2005 to 2008, when he was dismissed by Duquesne University president Charles J. Dougherty over a tenure battle.

Guter retired from active duty as the 37th Judge Advocate General of the Navy, the Navy's senior uniformed lawyer, from 2000 to 2002, having previously been Deputy Judge Advocate General of the Navy and Commander, Naval Legal Service Command from 1997 to 2000. He served as a special legal counsel to Chief of Naval Operations Frank Kelso in the aftermath of the Tailhook scandal, and was a notable opponent of the suspension of habeas corpus of Guantanamo Bay detainees under the George W. Bush administration.

== Early life and education ==
Born on June 26, 1948, Guter was raised in Pennsylvania. He graduated from the University of Colorado in 1970 with a B.A. degree. He gained admission to the Pennsylvania Bar upon receiving his Juris Doctor degree from Duquesne University Law School in 1977, graduating from the Naval Justice School the same year. He was admitted to the Bar of the U.S. Supreme Court in 2006.

== Military career ==
Guter was commissioned into the Navy via Naval Reserve Officers Training Corps in 1970. Originally a surface warfare officer, Guter transferred to the Judge Advocate General's Corps in 1977 upon graduation from the Naval Justice School. His first assignment was on the USS Sylvania (AFS-2) as a gunnery officer, administrative officer and legal officer consecutively from 1970 to 1973, with more than 30 months of overseas deployment to the Mediterranean and Caribbean Seas. He was promoted to commander on January 8, 1985.

Among Guter's assignments are as a military judge at Naval Station Great Lakes, Illinois, legislative assistant to the Vice Chief of Naval Operations, and legislative counsel to the Office of Legislative Affairs. He was a special legal counsel to Chief of Naval Operations Frank Kelso from 1990 to 1994, where he presented legal advice to the CNO in the wake of the Gulf War, the USS Iowa turret explosion and the Tailhook scandal. He commanded Naval Legal Service Office Mid-Atlantic in Norfolk, Virginia from 1994 to 1996.

Guter was appointed Deputy Judge Advocate General of the Navy on October 3, 1997, with a promotion to rear admiral effective October 1, 1997. Under the 36th judge advocate general, Rear Admiral John Hutson, he acted as JAG in the former's absence and dual-hatted as commander of the Naval Legal Service Command, oversaw the 13 major legal offices and 45 branch offices charged with prosecuting and defending service members in criminal cases.

Having been confirmed on April 27, 2000, Guter succeeded Hutson as the 37th Judge Advocate General of the Navy on June 9, 2000. As the service's top lawyer, he provided legal guidance to the Secretary of the Navy, Chief of Naval Operations and Department of the Navy and oversaw 1800 active duty, reserve and civilian attorneys and 1000 paralegals in the United States Navy. He protested the Bush administration's plans to convene special military commissions (without hearings before the Supreme Court) for Guantanamo Bay detainees in response to the September 11 terrorist attacks, but was overruled.

He relinquished the office to his deputy, Rear Admiral Michael F. Lohr on June 28, 2002.

== Academic career ==
After retirement, Guter became chief executive officer of the Vinson Hall Corporation, a nonprofit continuing care retirement community, from August 2002 to July 2005, and a member of the board of trustees of the Navy Marine Coast Guard Residence Foundation in support of the former role. He was among several retired JAGs to protest congressional efforts to evade the Supreme Court decision in Hamdan v. Rumsfeld. He testified against the suspension of habeas corpus of Guantanamo Bay detainees at a hearing of the Senate Judiciary Committee in July 2007, stating that "habeas corpus is the basis for a civilized legal system" and that Guantanamo, as an example of its absence, "shows us what can happen with an unchecked power".

In April 2005, it was announced that Guter would replace Nick Cafardi as dean of his alma mater, the Duquesne University School of Law. As dean, Guter updated Bar exam preparatory services, sought greater involvement from the school's 6500 alumni and recruited Professor Jan M. Levine as the school's first full-time legal research and writing director. However, feuds with university president Charles J. Dougherty over the latter's refusal to grant tenure to school professor John Rago, despite having the faculty's favorable vote, ended in Guter's dismissal on December 10, 2008. Guter remained at Duquesne as a law professor until the end of the academic year. The dismissal sparked protests from the student population.

In March 2009, Guter was named president and dean of the South Texas College of Law Houston, having previously sought a government job in Washington, D. C. after his dismissal. Guter stated that among his intentions as dean were to "increase the (college's) endowment" and "raise the school’s national profile, because South Texas isn’t very well known outside this part of the country". He assumed office on August 1, 2009.

Guter was recognized as one of Houston's most admired CEOs by the Houston Business Journal in July 2019. He departed the college the following month on August 1, 2019, relinquishing his post to Michael F. Barry, who previously served as assistant dean of St. Mary's University School of Law.

== Personal life ==
In the 2024 United States presidential election, Guter endorsed Kamala Harris.

== Awards and decorations ==

Surface warfare insignia
| Defense Distinguished Service Medal | | Legion of Merit with two award stars |
| Meritorious Service Medal with two award stars | Navy and Marine Corps Commendation Medal | Navy and Marine Corps Achievement Medal |
| Navy Meritorious Unit Commendation | National Defense Service Medal with bronze service star | Vietnam Service Medal with bronze service star |

Military offices
| Preceded by John Hutson | Deputy Judge Advocate General of the Navy; 1997–2000 | Succeeded by Michael F. Lohr |
| Preceded by John Hutson | Judge Advocate General of the Navy; 2000–2002 | Succeeded by Michael F. Lohr |
Educational offices
| Preceded by Nicholas P. Cafardi | Dean of the Duquesne University School of Law; 2005–2008 | Succeeded by Ken Gormley; Acting |
| Preceded by James J. Alfini | President and Dean of the South Texas College of Law Houston; 2009–2019 | Succeeded by Michael F. Barry |
