= Michael F. Lohr =

38th Judge Advocate General of the Navy

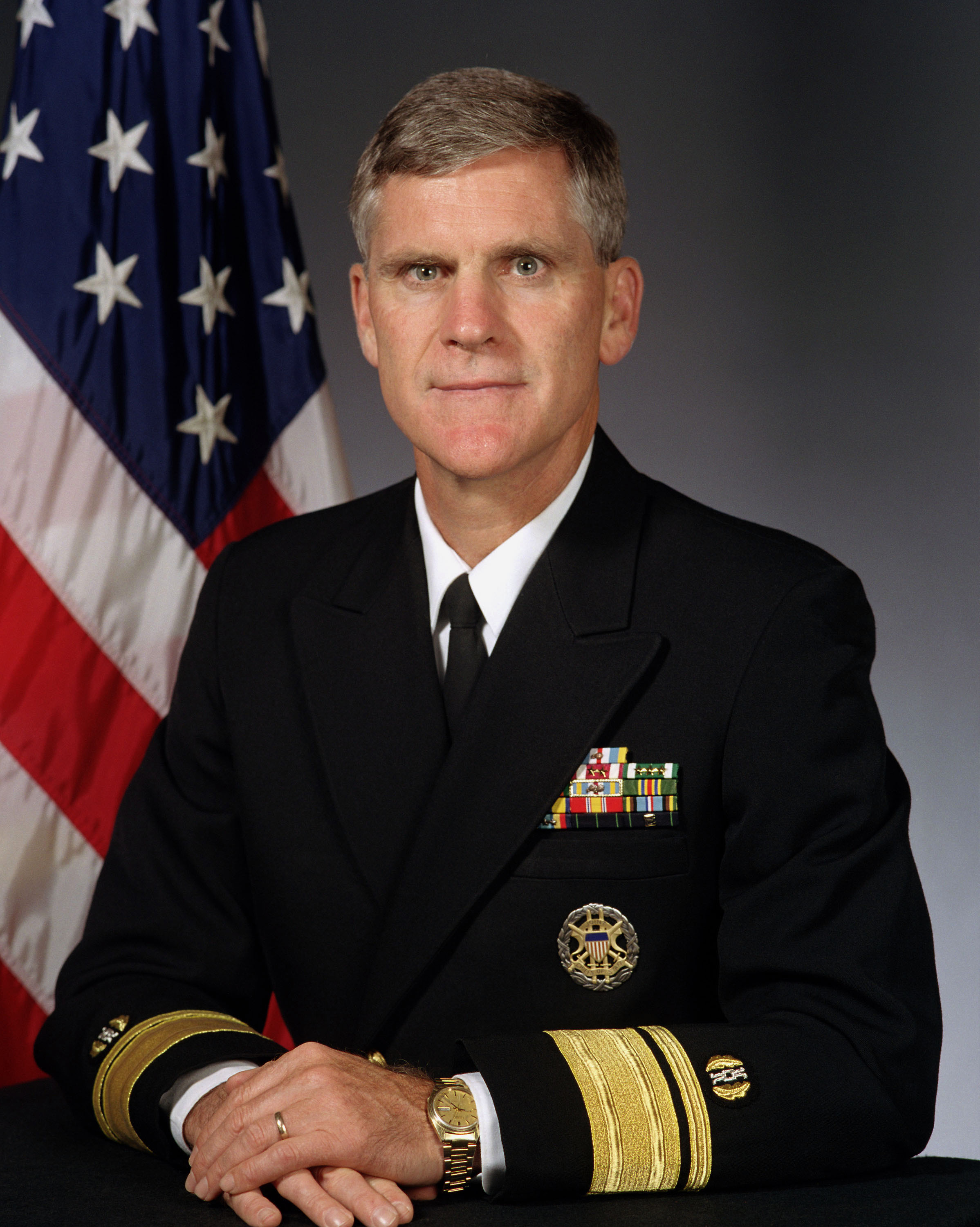
- Born: 1952 (age 73–74)
- Alma mater: University of Maryland (BA); University of Maryland School of Law (JD); George Washington University Law School (LLM); Northwestern University
- Military career
- Allegiance: United States of America
- Branch: United States Navy
- Service years: 1974–2004
- Rank: Rear Admiral
- Unit: Judge Advocate General's Corps, U.S. Navy
- Commands: Judge Advocate General of the Navy; Deputy Judge Advocate General of the Navy; Naval Legal Service Command; Naval Legal Service Office Mid-Atlantic
- Awards: Defense Superior Service Medal (2); Legion of Merit
- Other work: Director, Chicago Corporate Group, Boeing (2017–2019)

Michael Franklin Lohr (born 1952) is a retired United States Navy rear admiral who served as the 38th Judge Advocate General of the Navy from 2002 to 2004, assuming office on June 28, 2002. A career attorney, Lohr previously served as the Deputy Judge Advocate General of the Navy and Commander, Naval Legal Service Command from 2000 to 2002, with tenures as legal counsel to the Chairman of the Joint Chiefs of Staff and fleet judge advocate to the United States Second Fleet.

Lohr graduated from the University of Maryland with a B.A. degree (cum laude) in 1974, commissioning via the Navy's JAGC Student Program. Additionally, he earned his Juris Doctor degree from the University of Maryland School of Law in 1977 and a L.L.M. degree (summa cum laude) in International and Comparative Law from the George Washington University Law School in 1984. He attended Northwestern University in 2020.

Lohr has received the Defense Superior Service Medal (with oak leaf cluster), the Legion of Merit and three Meritorious Service Medals. After retirement, Lohr was employed by Boeing in various legal capacities from 2005 to 2019.

== Awards and decorations ==

Defense Superior Service Medal with oak leaf cluster
Legion of Merit	Meritorious Service Medal with two award stars	Navy and Marine Corps Commendation Medal with three award stars
Navy and Marine Corps Achievement Medal	Joint Meritorious Unit Award with two oak leaf clusters	Navy Meritorious Unit Commendation
Navy Expeditionary Medal	National Defense Service Medal	Armed Forces Expeditionary Medal
Navy Sea Service Deployment Ribbon with three bronze service stars	Navy Rifle Marksmanship Ribbon	Navy Expert Rifleman Medal
Office of the Joint Chiefs of Staff Identification Badge

Military offices
Preceded by Donald J. Guter	Deputy Judge Advocate General of the Navy; 2000–2002	Succeeded by James E. McPherson
Preceded by Donald J. Guter	Judge Advocate General of the Navy; 2002–2004	Succeeded by James E. McPherson
