= Attorney General Cullen =

Attorney General Cullen may refer to:

- Michael Cullen (politician) (born 1945), Attorney General of New Zealand
- Richard Cullen (attorney) (born 1948), Attorney General of Virginia

== See also ==
- General Cullen (disambiguation)
