= Council for a Livable World =

US non-profit advocacy organization

- Formation: July 1999; 27 years ago
- Type: 501(c)(4)
- Tax ID no.: EIN 520746112
- Headquarters: Washington, D.C.
- Executive Director: John F. Tierney
- Revenue: 327,941 USD (2024)
- Expenses: 343,363 USD (2024)
- Website: livableworld.org

Council for a Livable World is a Washington, D.C.-based non-profit advocacy organization dedicated to eliminating the U.S. arsenal of nuclear weapons. Its stated aim is for "progressive national security policies and helping elect congressional candidates who support them." The Council was founded in 1962 as the Council for Abolishing War by Hungarian nuclear physicist Leó Szilárd. Its education and research arm, the Center for Arms Control and Non-Proliferation, provides research to members of Congress and their staff. In February 2016, John F. Tierney was appointed the executive director of the Council for a Livable World and the Center for Arms Control and Non-Proliferation. For more than 50 years, the Council for a Livable World has been advocating for a more principled approach to U.S. national security and foreign policy.

== Policy influence and lobbying ==
Every election cycle, the Council endorses congressional candidates who are arms control advocates and who support the Council's outlook on national security issues. Since its inception, the Council has helped elect 134 U.S. arms control advocates to the Senate and 226 to the House of Representatives. Council supporters raised over $1.6 million in 2014. Candidates seeking endorsements are required to answer questionnaires on issues and to defend their positions in interviews. The Council endorses candidates for the House of Representatives through PeacePAC. The Council endorsed Presidents Barack Obama and Joe Biden in their respective first runs for U.S. Senate seats.

The Council has influenced U.S. arms control and national security policies for over fifty years by working on or supporting several issues including:

- Rallying support on Capitol Hill in favor of the Iran nuclear deal
- Ratifying the Chemical Weapons Convention and Intermediate-Range Nuclear Forces Treaty, Conventional Forces in Europe, Strategic Arms Reduction Treaty (START) and the New Strategic Arms Reduction Treaty (New START)
- Establishing a U.S. nuclear testing moratorium in 1992
- Banning biological weapons and terminating chemical weapons programs
- Limiting the deployment of the MX missile and B-2 bomber
- Blocking deployment of National Missile Defense by the Clinton administration
- Eliminating funding for the nuclear "Bunker Buster" and "Reliable Replacement Warhead", two new generations of nuclear weapons

== Father Robert F. Drinan National Peace and Human Rights Award ==
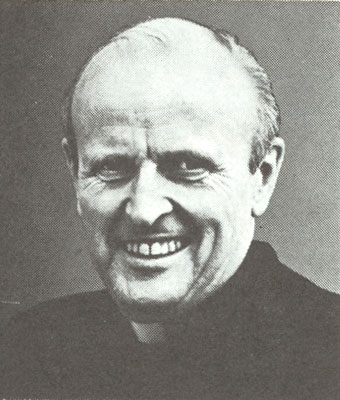
In 1970, Father Robert Drinan became the first Roman Catholic priest to be elected to the United States Congress. He served five terms as a congressman before an edict by Pope John Paul II instructed all Catholic priests to withdraw from electoral politics.

Since 2006, Council for a Livable World and its research center and sister organization, Center for Arms Control and Non-Proliferation, present the Father Robert F. Drinan National Peace and Human Rights Award to individuals who exemplify the late Father Drinan's commitment to peace and human justice. The award broadly focuses on U.S. politics, political science, physical science, biology, peace studies, and peace and human rights activism.

=== Officers ===
- Robert K. Musil, Chair
- Jules Zacher, Vice-Chair
- Timothy L. Brennan, Secretary
- Lorin Walker, Treasurer

== Board of directors ==
- Aron Bernstein, Professor of Physics Emeritus, Massachusetts Institute of Technology
- Paul Castleman, Business Executive
- Alice T. Day, Sociologist
- Laurie Dewey, Activist; Philanthropist
- Katherine Magraw, Foundation Consultant
- Gene Pokorny, Consultant
- Philip G. Schrag, Professor of Law, Georgetown University
- Dr. James Walsh, Research Associate, Massachusetts Institute of Technology’s Security Studies Program (SSP)
- Daniel Wirls, Professor, Merrill College, University of California
- Lt. General Robert Gard (ret. USA) PhD, Chairman of the Board, Center for Arms Control and Non-Proliferation
- Nicholas Clark, Business executive, and adjunct professor

== National advisory board ==
- Margaret Gage, president and executive director, Proteus Fund
- Sen. Gary Hart, former U.S. Senator
- Lawrence Hess, businessman
- John Isaacs, senior fellow
- General John H. Johns, retired brigadier general
- Colonel Richard Klass, U.S Air Force (ret.)
- Priscilla Johnson McMillan, associate, Davis Center for Russian and Eurasian Studies, Harvard University
- Matthew Meselson, professor, natural sciences, Harvard University
- Richard Schiff, actor

== See also ==
- List of anti-war organizations
