= Pittsburgh Council on Higher Education =

Coordinates: 40.43849°N 80.00126°W

The Pittsburgh Council on Higher Education is a consortium of colleges and universities in the Pittsburgh metro area. The organization exists to allow the schools and their students to take advantage of each other's resources and to facilitate sharing them.

Any full-time student at a member school may cross-register at another member school, barring certain restrictions.

== Member schools ==
- Carlow University
- Carnegie Mellon University
- Chatham University
- Community College of Allegheny County
- Duquesne University
- La Roche College
- Pittsburgh Theological Seminary
- Point Park University
- Robert Morris University
- University of Pittsburgh
- Pittsburgh Technical College
