= Thomas R. Kline School of Law of Duquesne University =

Private law school in Pittsburgh, Pennsylvania, U.S.

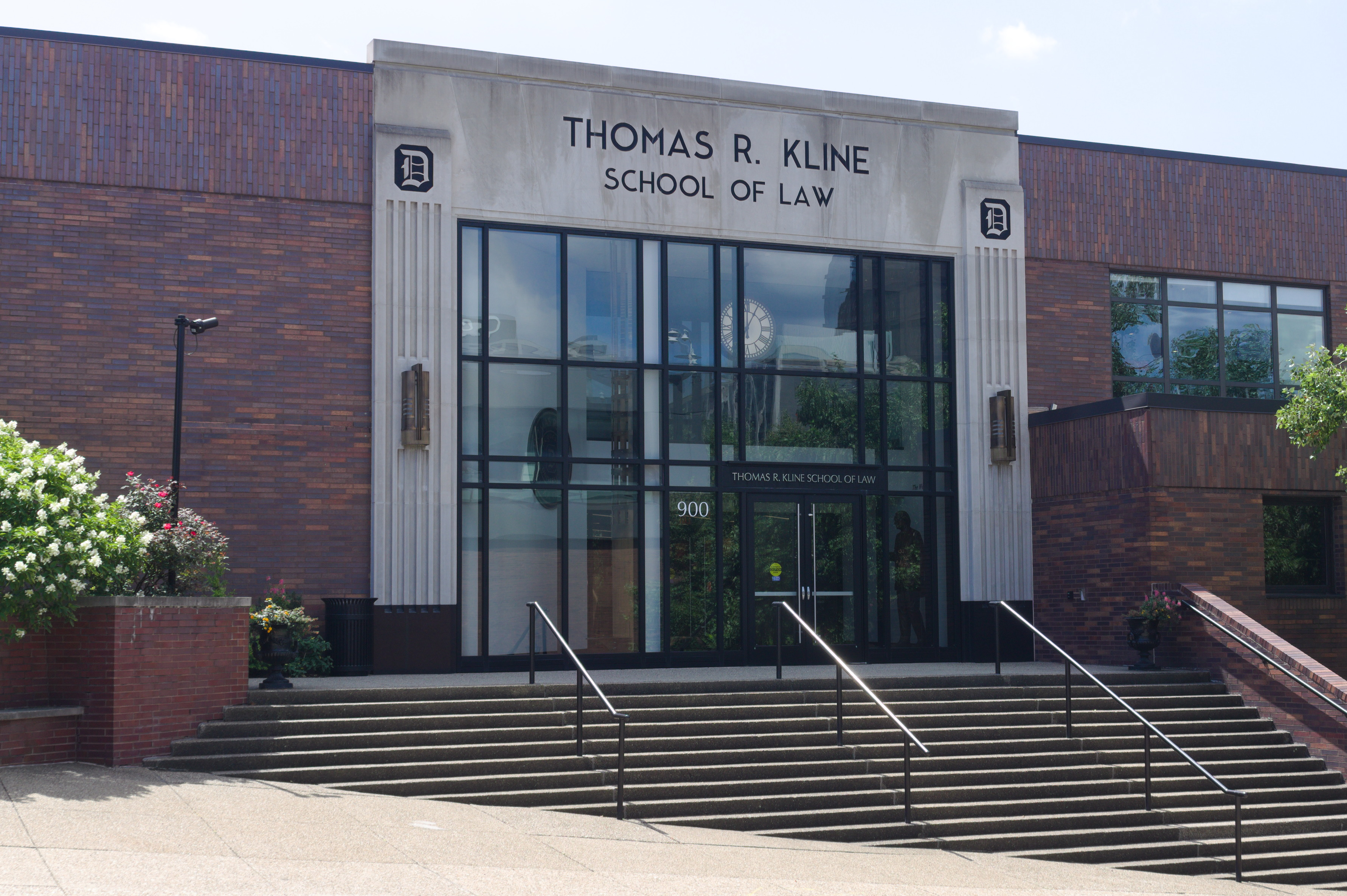
- The Locust Street entrance to the Thomas R. Kline School of Law
- Motto: Salus populi suprema lex
- Parent school: Duquesne University
- Religious affiliation: Catholic (Spiritan)
- Established: 1911; 115 years ago
- School type: Private
- Dean: April M. Barton
- Location: Pittsburgh, Pennsylvania, United States
- Enrollment: 528 (2025)
- Website: www.duq.edu/academics/colleges-and-schools/law/
- ABA profile: ABA disclosures

The Thomas R. Kline School of Law of Duquesne University is the law school of Duquesne University, a private Catholic university in Pittsburgh, Pennsylvania. Founded in 1911, the school has been approved by the American Bar Association since 1960 and has been a member of the Association of American Law Schools since 1964. It offers full-time and part-time Juris Doctor programs and a Master of Laws program for foreign-trained lawyers.

== History ==
Duquesne announced the establishment of its law school in June 1911. Joseph M. Swearingen, a judge of the Allegheny County Court of Common Pleas, became its first dean, and classes began on September 25 in the George Building on Fourth Avenue in downtown Pittsburgh. The school was organized as an evening program intended in part for students who were employed during the day. In 1914, its classes were moved to evening hours from 6 to 8 p.m.

The school began offering day classes and moved to Rockwell Hall in 1958. The first volume of the Duquesne Law Review appeared in 1963, followed by the first volume of Juris Magazine in 1967. Ronald R. Davenport became dean in 1970. Ground was broken for Edward J. Hanley Hall in 1981, and the building was dedicated the following year. The John E. Murray Jr. Pavilion opened in 1999.

Duquesne established a clinical legal-education program in 1995. Originally known as the Hugo L. Black Law Clinic, it was renamed the Tribone Center for Clinical Legal Education in 2013 after a gift from alumnus Thomas R. Tribone.

In September 2022, the school was renamed for alumnus and trial lawyer Thomas R. Kline after he committed $50 million to the university. The gift was the largest in Duquesne's history. Renovations supported by a subsequent gift from Kline included a new façade and entrance to Hanley Hall and an archival exhibition room. The building was rededicated in April 2024.

== Academics ==
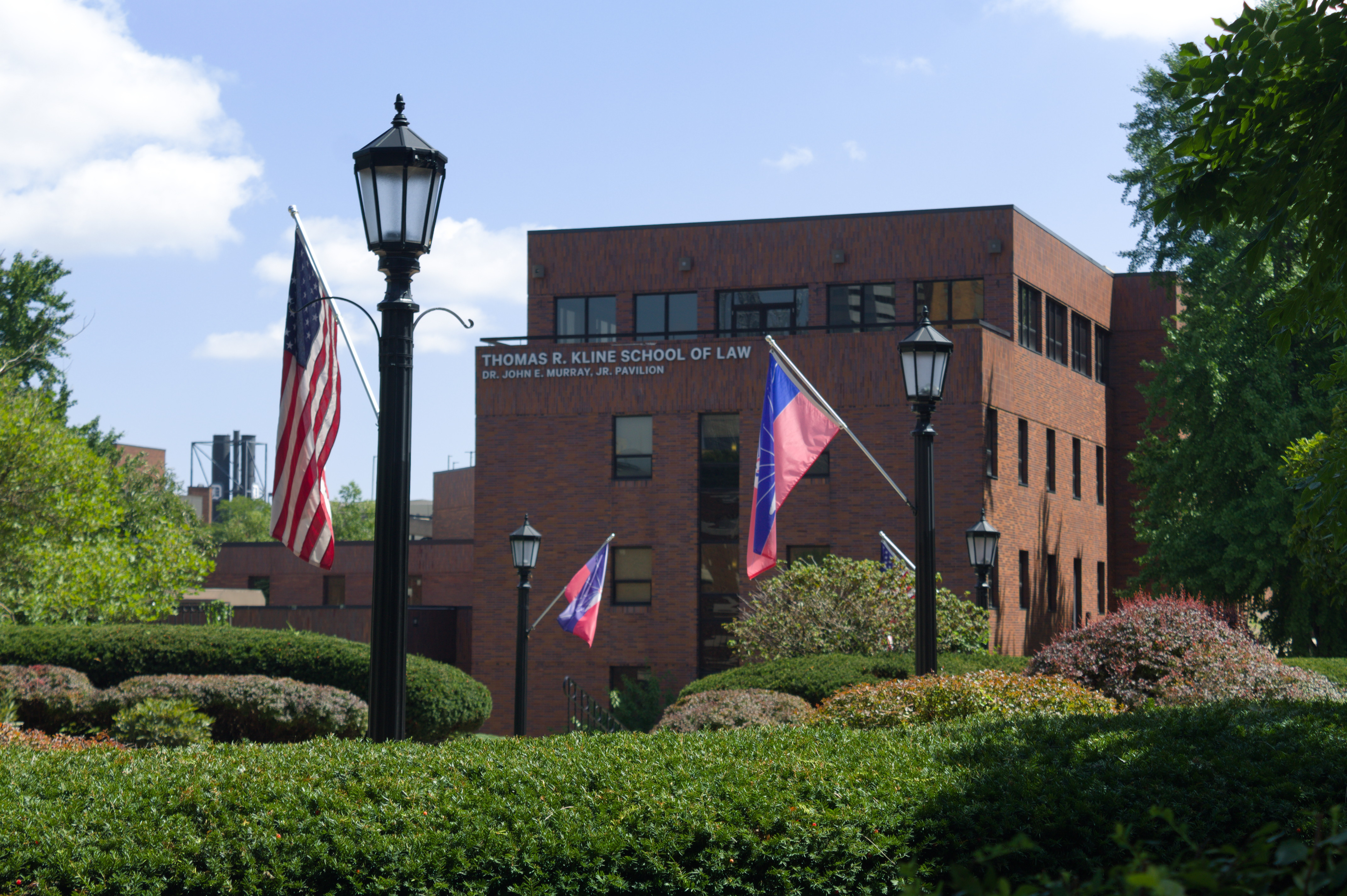
The Dr. John E. Murray, Jr. Pavilion of the Thomas R. Kline School of Law

The school offers a full-time day J.D. program, a part-time day program and a part-time evening program. Its evening division continues the part-time program with which the school was founded.

Joint-degree programs combine the J.D. with graduate study in business, environmental science, healthcare, philosophy or divinity. The school also awards an LL.M. for foreign lawyers, including through agreements with law schools outside the United States.

Summer study-abroad programs have been offered in Germany and France and in Dublin and Belfast.

=== Clinical education ===
The Tribone Center for Clinical Legal Education administers community-based clinics, externships, fellowships and pro bono programs. Students may represent clients under supervision, participate in judicial, governmental and nonprofit placements, and work with the Pennsylvania Innocence Project. The center occupies a three-story building at 912–914 Fifth Avenue, near the courts and government offices of downtown Pittsburgh.

== Admissions and outcomes ==
For the class entering in 2025, the school received 1,432 completed applications and offered admission to 619 applicants, an acceptance rate of 43.23 percent. A total of 183 applicants enrolled. The school reported total J.D. enrollment of 528 during the 2025 reporting year.

Of the 157 members of the class of 2024, 148 held full-time, long-term employment ten months after graduation. Those positions included 136 for which bar admission was required or anticipated and eight classified as J.D. advantage positions. One additional graduate was pursuing further graduate study.

Among 2024 graduates taking the Pennsylvania bar examination for the first time, 120 of 135 passed, a rate of 88.89 percent. The corresponding statewide rate for graduates of ABA-approved law schools was 80.25 percent.

== Facilities ==
The school is housed principally in Edward J. Hanley Hall and the John E. Murray Jr. Pavilion. Together with the law library, the structures provide approximately 125,000 sq ft (11,600 m^{2}) of classrooms, offices, courtrooms, study areas and library space. The Tribone Center houses the school's clinics in a separate building on Fifth Avenue.

== Publications ==
The school's current student-edited publications are the Duquesne Law Review, Joule: Duquesne Kline Energy & Environmental Law Journal and the Juris Chronicle.
