= John Fugh =

American major general of United States Army

John Liu Fugh
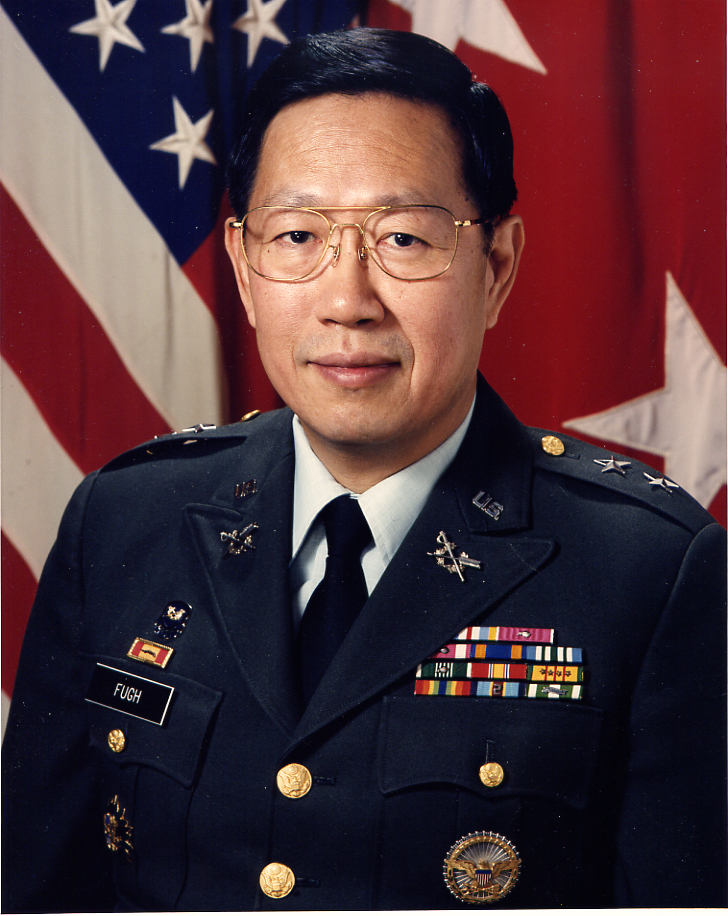
- Major General John Liu Fugh; 33rd Judge Advocate General of the United States Army
- Born: September 12, 1934; Beijing, Republic of China
- Died: May 11, 2010 (aged 75); Bethesda, Maryland, U.S.
- Burial place: Arlington National Cemetery (Arlington County, Virginia, U.S.)
- Military career
- Allegiance: United States of America
- Branch: United States Army
- Service years: 1961–1993
- Rank: Major General
- Commands: Judge Advocate General of the United States Army
- Conflicts: Vietnam War
- Awards: Distinguished Service Medal; Def. Superior Service Medal; Legion of Merit

Major General John Liu Fugh (/dʒɒn ljuː fuː/; Chinese: 傅履仁; pinyin: Fù Lǚrén; September 12, 1934 – May 11, 2010) was the first Chinese American to attain general officer status in the US Army. He was of Manchu descent. He was the 33rd Judge Advocate General of the US Army.

== Early life and education ==
Fugh was born in Peking, Republic of China, the son of Philip Fugh (Chinese: 傅涇波; pinyin: Fu Jīngbō), who was a Manchu noble from the Fuca clan and a long-time senior staff to John Leighton Stuart, the president of Yenching University and ambassador of the US to China. John Fugh moved to the United States with his family in 1950, when he was 15 years old.

Fugh attended the Edmund A. Walsh School of Foreign Service at Georgetown University, graduating in 1957 with a Bachelor of Science degree in international relations. In 1957, Fugh became a United States citizen and entered George Washington University Law School, from which he later graduated with a Bachelor of Laws degree in 1960.

Fugh became a member of the Washington, D.C. Bar on November 21, 1960. Fugh also attended the Harvard Kennedy School at Harvard University and was a graduate of the Command and General Staff College and the US Army War College.

== Career ==
In 1961, Fugh was commissioned into the US Army Judge Advocate General's Corps. He was stationed in San Francisco, Vietnam, and Europe, and was also part of the Military Assistance Advisory Group (MAAG) in Taipei, Republic of China from 1969 to 1972. From 1973 to 1976, Fugh served as the legal advisor to the Ballistic Missile Defense Office. From 1976 to 1978, Fugh held the position of staff judge advocate for the Third Armored Division in Frankfurt, Germany. From 1979 to 1982, Fugh was the legal advisor to the Assistant Secretary of Defense (Manpower and Reserve Affairs). From 1982 to 1984, Fugh served as the Chief of Army Litigation.

In 1984, Fugh was promoted to the rank of brigadier general, and became the assistant judge advocate general for civil law. In this position, he created the Army's first environmental law division and the procurement fraud division. He, along with William S. Chen, were among the first Chinese Americans to become two-star rank in the United States Armed Forces in 1989.

Fugh was then promoted to The Judge Advocate General (TJAG), a position he held from July 26, 1991, to September 30, 1993. As TJAG, Fugh was legal advisor to the Army Chief of Staff for the Persian Gulf War.

During his time as The Judge Advocate General, Fugh established a human rights training program for developing countries and published the War Crimes Report, the first American effort since World War II to systematically document enemy war crimes. Fugh formed the Desert Storm Assessment Team to study Judge Advocate General Corps doctrine and combat roles.

Fugh retired from active duty in 1993 with the rank of major general, and was awarded the Distinguished Service Medal by the Army Chief of Staff.

After retiring from the Army, Fugh joined the Richmond, Virginia-headquartered law firm of McGuire, Woods, Battle and Boothe as a partner in its Washington, D.C. office. In 1995, Fugh joined McDonnell Douglas-China as president, responsible for strategic direction of business in China. Following the merger of McDonnell Douglas with Boeing, Fugh served as executive vice president of Boeing China, Inc. In 1997, Fugh joined Enron International China as chairman, developing relations with the Chinese government.

== Retirement and death ==
Fugh retired from Enron in 2001 and was then active in Sino-American relations, co-chairing and later chairing the Committee of 100, a non-partisan membership organization of over 150 prominent Chinese Americans, including I. M. Pei and Yo Yo Ma. Its dual mission is to encourage a constructive relationship between the US and Greater China, as well as to strengthen Chinese American participation in American life. Fugh was also a member of the executive committee of the Atlantic Council, as well as a board member of the National Chinese American Memorial Foundation, and a member of the Asia Society's Washington Center Advisory Committee, until his death on May 11, 2010, at the age of 75 due to heart attack.

Fugh was survived by his wife June Chung (Chinese: 宗毓珍; pinyin: Zōng Yùzhēn), Connie Chung's elder sister; his daughter Justina Fugh and her husband Jonathan Frenzel; his son Jarrett Fugh and his wife Tracey; and his four grandchildren: Jeremy and Joshua Frenzel and Isabelle and Sophia Fugh. They lived together in Virginia until Fugh's death.

== Awards and decorations ==
=== Awards ===
In 2004, Fugh was awarded the Chinese American Pioneer Award by the Organization of Chinese Americans for "his illustrious accomplishment in his field, and contribution to the Chinese-American community." In 2008, Fugh was recognized as an Outstanding American by Choice at a White House ceremony by the US Citizenship and Immigration Services. In 2008, Fugh received the Trailblazer Award from the National Asian Pacific American Bar Association (NAPABA).

=== Decorations ===
- Army Distinguished Service Medal
- Defense Superior Service Medal
- Legion of Merit with oak leaf cluster
- Bronze Star Medal
- Air Medal
- Meritorious Service Medal with oak leaf cluster
- Joint Service Commendation Medal
- Army Commendation Ribbon with oak leaf cluster

== See also ==
- List of Asian American jurists
- List of first minority male lawyers and judges in the United States

Military offices
Preceded by William K. Suter (Acting)	Judge Advocate General of the United States Army; 1991–1993	Succeeded by Michael J. Nardotti, Jr.
