= Robert G. Gard Jr. =

United States Army general (1928–2026)

Robert Gard
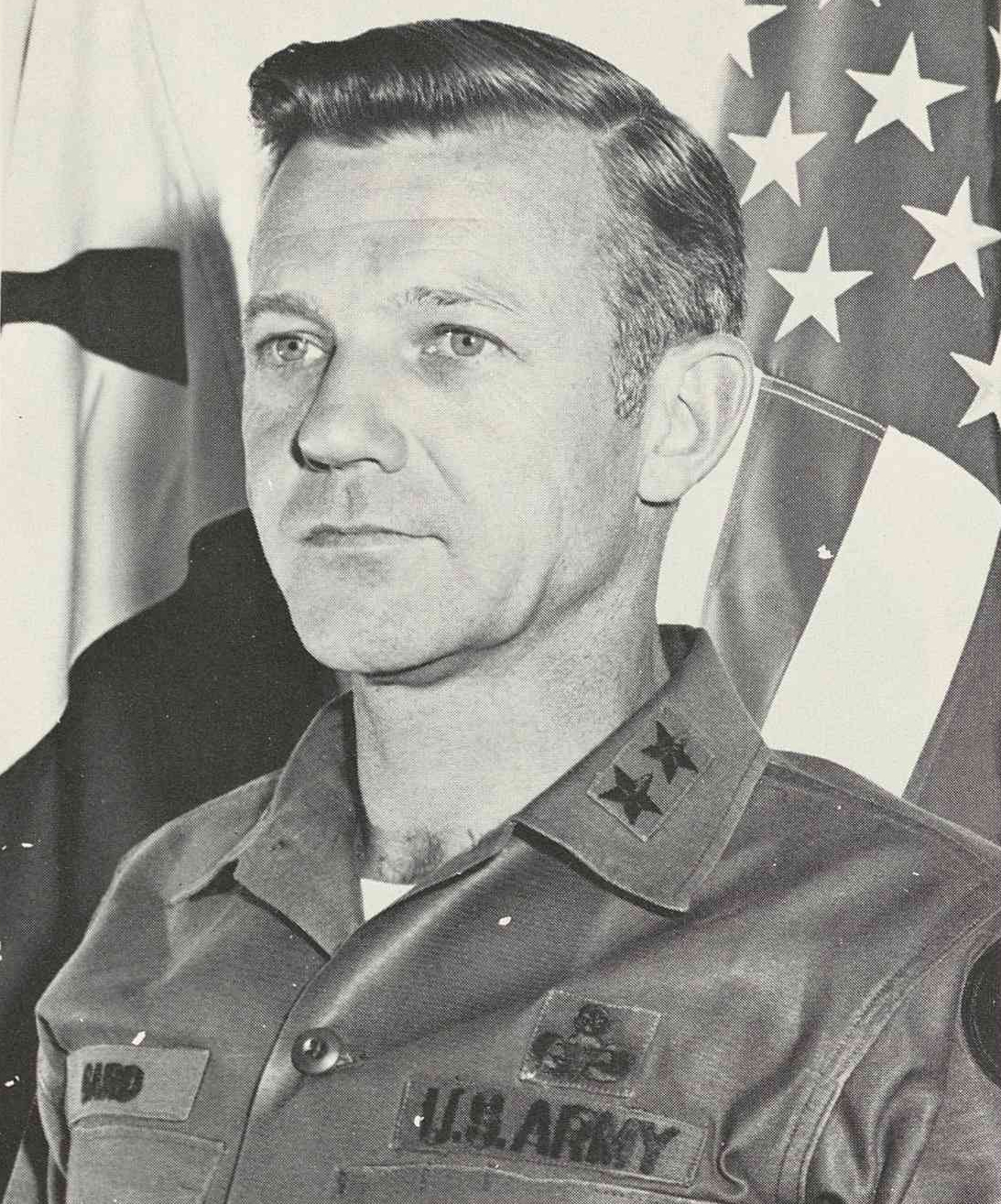
- Gard as commanding general of Fort Ord c. 1974
- Born: January 28, 1928; West Point, New York, U.S.
- Died: April 6, 2026 (aged 98)
- Allegiance: United States of America
- Branch: United States Army
- Service years: 1950–1981
- Rank: Lieutenant general
- Commands: National Defense University
- Conflicts: Korean War; Vietnam War

Robert Gibbins Gard Jr. (January 28, 1928 – April 6, 2026) was a United States Army lieutenant general and former chairman of the board of the Center for Arms Control and Non-Proliferation where his work focused on nuclear nonproliferation, missile defense, Iraq, Iran, military policy, nuclear terrorism, and other national security issues.

== Early life and education ==
Gard was born in West Point, New York, and educated at TMI Episcopal school in San Antonio, Texas, before receiving a place at the United States Military Academy (West Point).

Gard graduated from West Point with a B.S. in 1950.

== Army career ==
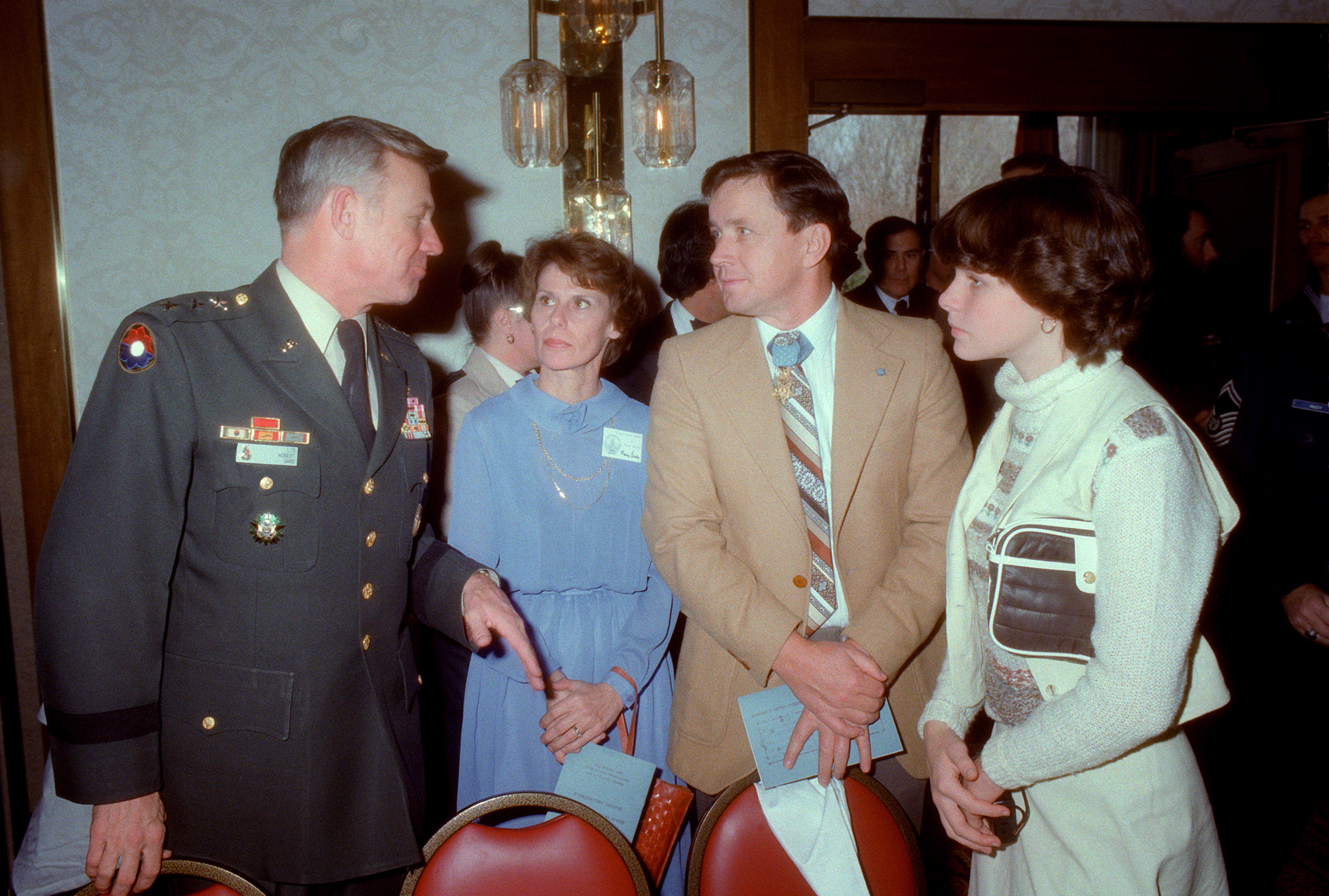
Gard (left) speaking with Colonel Patrick Henry Brady, U.S. Army, in 1981

After graduating from West Point, Gard was an Army officer for the next 31 years, retiring in 1981. Gard served in South Korea (1952–54) and then received an M.P.A. (1956) and a Ph.D. in political economy and government (1962), both from Harvard University. Gard then served in West Germany (1962–65), graduated from the National War College (1966), and served as military assistant to two secretaries of defense (1966–68). Gard then served in South Vietnam (1968–69). After returning from South Vietnam, Gard was a fellow at the Council on Foreign Relations in New York (1970–71), director of Human Resources Development for the U.S. Army (1971–72), commanding general of Fort Ord in California (1973–75), and commanding general of the U.S. Army Military Personnel Center (1975–77). Gard's final military post was as president of the National Defense University in Washington, D.C. (1977–81). In 1981, Gard retired as a lieutenant general after 31 years of service.

== Post-Army career ==
After retiring from the Army, Gard served as visiting professor of international relations at the American University of Paris (1981–82), director of the Bologna Center of the Johns Hopkins School of Advanced International Studies (SAIS) in Bologna, Italy (1982–87), and president of the Monterey Institute of International Studies in Monterey, California (1987–98). Since 1998, Gard has served as a Washington, D.C.-area consultant on international security.

Gard was a member of the Council on Foreign Relations and served on the boards of governors of the APEC Education Foundation; the boards of directors of the Bulletin of the Atomic Scientists and Center for Arms Control and Non-Proliferation; the board of trustees of Chapman Foundation and Veterans for America (formerly the Vietnam Veterans of America Foundation); the board of advisors of the United Foundation for Chinese Orphans; and the board of visitors of the Defense Language Institute.

Gard has written a number of published monographs, book chapters, academic journal articles, and newspaper op-eds.

Gard has argued that the U.S. should ratify the Ottawa Treaty banning land mines, and was an advocate for nuclear arms control measures, such as the New START treaty.

Gard was a staunch critic of the Iraq War, speaking out against the war in 2007 and writing in 2013 that the war "has come to symbolize an era of American overreach and, to some, even hubris." In 2008, Gard endorsed Barack Obama for president and criticized John McCain, writing that "McCain has adopted, promoted, and sustained the position of the so-called neo-conservatives and ultra-nationalists who believe that the United States should capitalize on American military superiority to spread democracy abroad."

In 2006, Gard was one of 22 retired generals and admirals to sign an open letter urging President George W. Bush to fully implement the "McCain Amendment" banning the use of torture. In 2014, Gard was also one of 31 retired generals and admirals to sign an open letter to the Senate Select Committee on Intelligence urging them to vote to declassify and make public the committee's report on post-September 11 torture tactics used by the CIA.

In 2012, Gard co-authored a CNN op-ed with fellow retired general John H. Johns, arguing for a cut in wasteful Pentagon spending. Gard and Johns wrote: "Our leaders must have a serious debate about priorities: America needs political resolve to kill unnecessary and expensive projects." The pair also wrote that "sadly, defense spending is driven by political interests, not necessity." Gard and John specifically criticized Department of Defense plans to spend more than $700 billion on nuclear weapons over the next ten years (a program which the authors termed "based more on ideology than security") and the F-35 Joint Strike Fighter (the development of which, the authors pointed out, "has cost more than was spent on veterans in the last 20 years").

Gard wrote a letter to the chairman and ranking member of the Senate Judiciary Committee opposing a proposed flag desecration amendment.

Gard Jr. died on April 6, 2026, at the age of 98.
