= Lee F. Gunn =

United States Navy admiral (1942–2025)

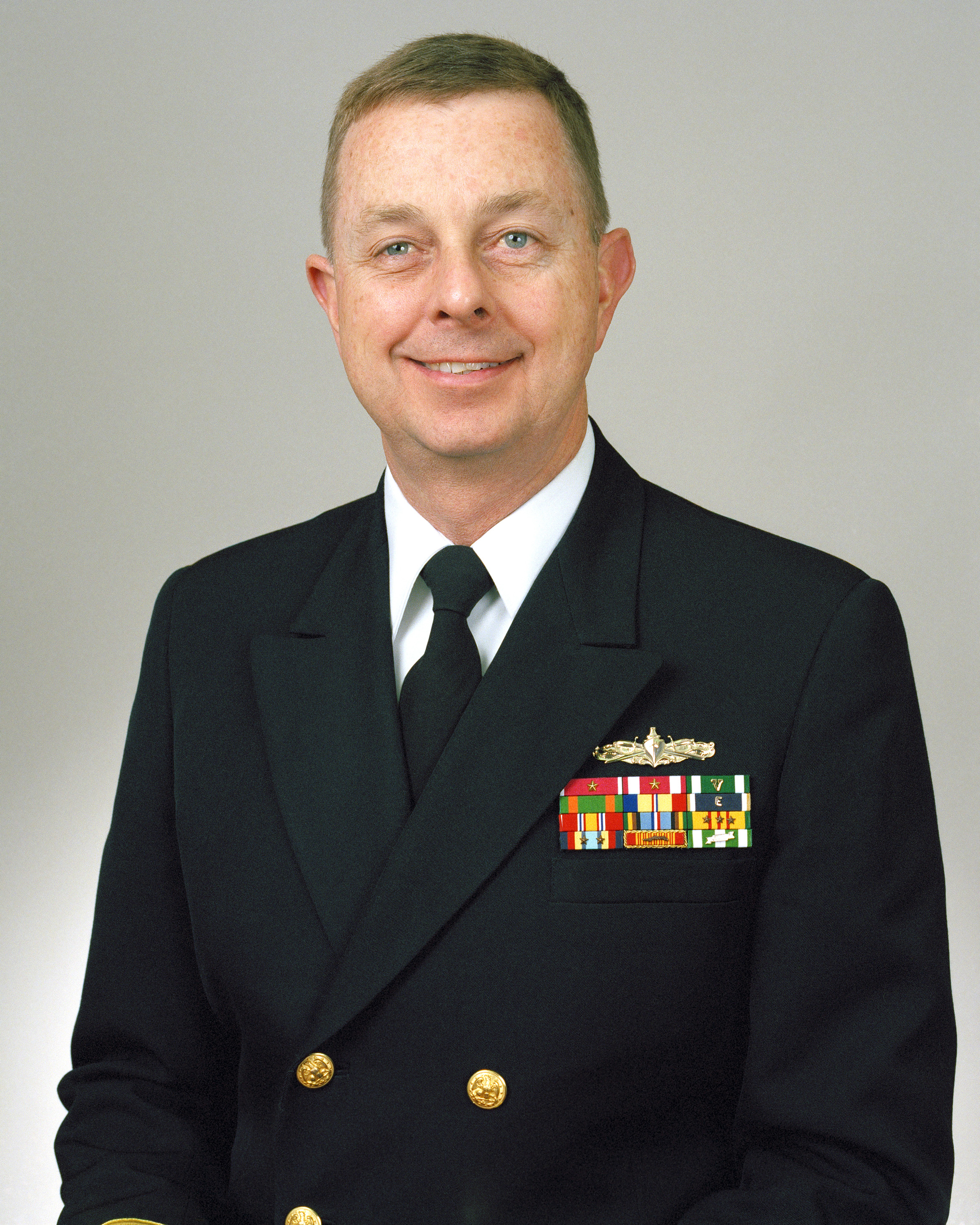
- Lee F. Gunn in 1992 prior to his promotion to Rear Admiral (lower half)
- Born: 1942; Michigan, United States
- Died: December 13, 2025 (aged 83)
- Alma mater: University of California, Los Angeles; Naval Postgraduate School
- Military career
- Allegiance: United States
- Branch: United States Navy
- Service years: 1965–2000
- Rank: Vice admiral
- Commands: Amphibious Group Three; Navy Personnel Command; Destroyer Squadron 31; USS Barbey
- Conflicts: Vietnam War; Operation Desert Storm; Operation United Shield
- Awards: Navy Distinguished Service Medal; Defense Superior Service Medal; Legion of Merit (6)

Lee Fredric Gunn (1942 – December 13, 2025) was a Vice Admiral and former Naval Inspector General of the United States Department of the Navy.

== Education and Family ==
Gunn earned a Bachelor's degree in Experimental and Physiological Psychology from the University of California, Los Angeles and a Master of Science degree in Operations Research from the Naval Postgraduate School in Monterey, California.

== Naval career ==
Commissioned into the United States Navy from the Naval Reserve Officer Training Corps program at the University of California, Los Angeles, Gunn served as a Surface Warfare Officer and rose to command the anti-submarine warfare tactical, test, and evaluation destroyer squadron.

He later commanded Amphibious Group Three (PHIBGRU THREE), consisting of nineteen ships, twelve other, separate commands, and 16,000 sailors and marines. As commander of this force, he also served as the Commander, Combined Naval Forces, and Deputy Task Force Commander of Operation United Shield, the final withdrawal of United Nations peacekeeping forces from Somalia in February and March 1995.

Admiral Gunn served in eight assignments in the areas of manpower, personnel and training. During his last manpower assignment as Deputy Chief of Naval Personnel, and Commander, Navy Personnel Command, he played a key role in redesigning the Navy's manpower and personnel establishment and he orchestrated the transfer of the Navy's Personnel Command from Arlington, Virginia to Millington, Tennessee.

Appointed Naval Inspector General in July 1997, Vice Admiral Gunn instituted the Navy's Operational Cost Management training and evaluation program, and reconfigured Navy's major command management inspection process to teach and evaluate cost management. He retired from active service in August 2000.

== Post-Naval Career ==
Immediately after retirement, the Chief of Naval Operations appointed Gunn to lead an executive review of naval training, a nine-month review conducted by a senior team of experts. Gunn has also served as board member of the American Small Business Coalition from 2004 to 2008.

President of the American Security Project, a bi-partisan national security think tank in Washington, DC; Chairman of the Board of Advisors to the Presidents of the Naval Postgraduate School in Monterey, CA and the Naval War College in Newport, RI; an advisor to the Global Perspectives Initiative at the University of Central Florida: and a member and Executive Board member of the Surface Navy Association, the professional association of more than 7,000 surface warriors and supporters in the United States Navy. He served as National President of the Surface Navy Association from 2001 to 2006.

Gunn joined the CNA corporation in Alexandria, Virginia in October 2001. From 2003 until his retirement in 2015, he served as President of CNA's Institute for Public Research (IPR). IPR meets the research and analysis needs of those who address domestic policy issues in the areas of: air traffic management; education; health research and policy; organizational learning and effectiveness; safety and security; justice; energy, water, and climate; and other domestic issues. Gunn has been a member of CNA's Military Advisory Board (retired admirals and generals) researching issues in national security since 2009 and was the Vice Chairman of CNA's MAB since 2012.

Gunn also served on the board of directors for the American Security Project.

== Politics ==
In the 2024 United States presidential election, Gunn endorsed Kamala Harris.

== Decorations and awards ==
Gunn's awards and decorations include:

- Navy Distinguished Service Medal
- Defense Superior Service Medal
- Legion of Merit with one silver star
- Meritorious Service Medal with two stars
- Navy Commendation Medal with Combat Distinguishing Device
- Navy and Marine Corps Achievement Medal
- Combat Action Ribbon

Military offices
Preceded by James R. Fitzgerald	Naval Inspector General; July 1997–August 2000	Succeeded by Michael D. Haskins
