= Jesse B. Oldendorf =

United States Navy admiral (1887–1974)

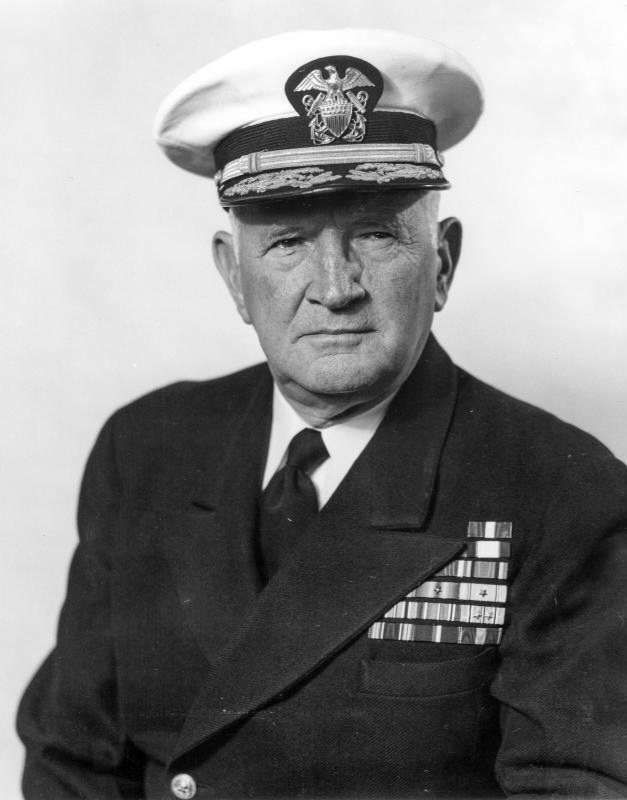
- Admiral Jesse B. Oldendorf
- Born: 16 February 1887; Riverside, California, U.S.
- Died: 27 April 1974 (aged 87); Portsmouth, Virginia, U.S.
- Military career
- Allegiance: United States
- Branch: United States Navy
- Service years: 1909–1948
- Rank: Admiral
- Nickname: Oley
- Commands: Western Sea Frontier; San Diego Naval Base; 11th Naval District; Task Force 95; Battleship Squadron 1; Cruiser Division 4; USS Houston; USS Decatur
- Conflicts: Mexican Revolution; World War I Battle of the Atlantic; World War II Battle of the Atlantic Battle of the Caribbean Battle of Marshall Islands Battle of the Palau Islands Battle of the Marianas Islands Battle of Leyte Gulf Battle of Lingayen Gulf Battle of Okinawa Occupation of Japan
- Awards: Navy Cross; Navy Distinguished Service Medal (3); Army Distinguished Service Medal; Legion of Merit (2); Purple Heart (2)

Jesse Barrett "Oley" Oldendorf (16 February 1887 – 27 April 1974) was an admiral in the United States Navy, famous for defeating a Japanese force in the Battle of Leyte Gulf during World War II. He also served as commander of the American naval forces during the early phase of the Battle of the Caribbean. In early 1942, a secret group of senior Navy officers empaneled by President Franklin D. Roosevelt assessed him as one of the 40 most competent of the 120 flag officers in the Navy.

== Early life ==
Jesse Barrett Oldendorf was born in Riverside, California on 16 February 1887. He graduated from the United States Naval Academy in 1909, standing 141st in a class of 174, and was commissioned in 1911. His Academy classmates included Admiral Alan G. Kirk and Vice Admirals Olaf M. Hustveldt and Theodore S. Wilkinson. Oldendorf served aboard the armored cruiser USS California, the torpedo boat destroyer USS Preble, the cruiser USS Denver, the destroyer USS Whipple and the armored cruiser California again, although she had been renamed San Diego. He also served on the Panama Canal hydrographic survey ship USS Hannibal.

== World War I ==
During World War I, Oldendorf spent a few months on recruiting duty in Philadelphia. From June to August 1917, he commanded the naval armed guard on USAT Saratoga. The ship sank as a result of a collision in New York. He then became a gunnery officer aboard the troop transport USS President Lincoln, which was sunk by three torpedoes from the German submarine U-90 off Ireland on 31 May 1918. From August 1918 to March 1919, he was engineering officer of USS Seattle. In July, he was briefly executive officer of USS Patricia.

== Between the wars ==
Between the great wars, Oldendorf did a stint in charge of recruiting station Pittsburgh, acted as an engineering inspector in Baltimore, and served as officer in charge of a hydrographic office. In 1920, he was assigned to the patrol yacht USS Niagara. From 1921 to 1922, Oldendorf was stationed on USS Birmingham in the Caribbean, while acting as flag secretary to Special Service Squadron commanders Rear Admiral Casey B. Morgan, Captain Austin Kautz and Rear Admiral William C. Cole. From 1922 to 1924 he served as aide to Rear Admiral Josiah S. McKean, commandant of the Mare Island Navy Yard. In 1925, Oldendorf, now a commander, assumed his first command, the destroyer USS Decatur, Afterwards, he was aide to successive commandants of the Philadelphia Navy Yard, Rear Admiral Thomas P. Magruder and Julian Lane Latimer from 1927 to 1928.

Oldendorf attended the Naval War College from 1928 to 1929 and then the Army War College from 1929 to 1930. From 1930 to 1935, he was the navigator of the battleship USS New York. Following the normal pattern of alternating duty at sea with shore duty, Oldendorf taught navigation at the Naval Academy from 1932 to 1935. Following this teaching assignment at the Academy, Oldendorf returned to sea duty serving as executive officer of the battleship USS West Virginia from 1935 to 1937. From 1937 to 1939, Oldendorf directed the recruiting section of the Bureau of Navigation.

== World War II ==
From 1939 to 1941, Oldendorf commanded the cruiser USS Houston. In September 1941, he joined the staff of the Naval War College, where he taught navigation until February 1942. On 31 March 1942, Oldendorf was promoted to rear admiral, and assigned to the Aruba-Curaçao sector of the Caribbean Sea Frontier. In August 1942, he was transferred to the Trinidad sector where anti-submarine warfare was his primary duty. From May through December 1943, Oldendorf commanded Task Force 24 which was assigned all Western Atlantic escorts. His flagships during this period were destroyer tender USS Prairie and fleet tug USS Kiowa.

Oldendorf was reassigned to the United States Pacific Fleet in January 1944, where he commanded Cruiser Division 4 (CruDiv 4) from his flagship USS Louisville. Cruiser Division 4, consisting of cruisers and battleships, supported carrier operations and provided fire support for the landings in the Marshalls, Palaus, Marianas, and Leyte.

On 12 September 1944, Oldendorf commanded from the bridge of his flagship, USS Pennsylvania, the Fire Support Group tasked with the bombardment of Peleliu in the Palaus island group. This Fire Support Group consisted of five battleships, Pennsylvania, USS Idaho, USS Maryland, USS Mississippi, and USS Tennessee, eight cruisers, twelve destroyers, seven minesweepers, fifteen landing craft converted to rocket launchers, and a half-dozen submarines. At this point in his career, Oldendorf was an experienced battle commander who had handled similar assignments in three previous Marine landings. The bombardment was scheduled to last three days. By the end of the first day, aerial reconnaissance photos indicated that close to 300 of the assigned targets had been destroyed or seriously damaged by the all-day bombardment and that virtually every aboveground structure and fortification had been eradicated. At the airport its few usable planes were reduced to wreckage.

By the evening of the second day, every target specified on the master list in Pennsylvania's combat center had been struck repeatedly. However, Oldendorf was concerned because no return fire had been detected from the concentrations of enemy heavy artillery shown in earlier aerial reconnaissance photos and because the latest photos contained no evidence that these weapons had been destroyed. It was surmised that the Japanese had moved their heavy artillery underground where they could have survived the bombardment. Despite these concerns, Oldendorf made the decision to call off the bombardment at the end of the second day of a pre-arranged schedule that called for a third full day of attacks.

This would have tragic results for the 1st Marines' beach assault on Peleliu because the white coral outcropping designated as "the Point" was left virtually untouched despite the specific request that Lieutenant Colonel Lewis "Chesty" Puller, commander of the 1st Marines, made to Oldendorf's staff to target it in the Navy's bombardment. "The Point" commanded the heights 30 feet above the north end of White Beach 1 on which the 1st Marines landed and was considered by Puller to be a potential defensive strongpoint too obvious for the Japanese to overlook. The result of not sufficiently reducing "the Point" was a bloodbath. Over 500 men were lost, roughly one-sixth of its regimental strength, on the D-Day White Beach assault on Peleliu, and the entire beachhead was in danger of collapsing. It was only by the heroism of the Marines that "the Point" was taken. After the war when asked about Pelilieu, Oldendorf commented that "If military leaders – and that includes Navy brass – were gifted with the same accuracy of foresight that they are with hindsight, then the assault of Peleliu should never have been attempted."

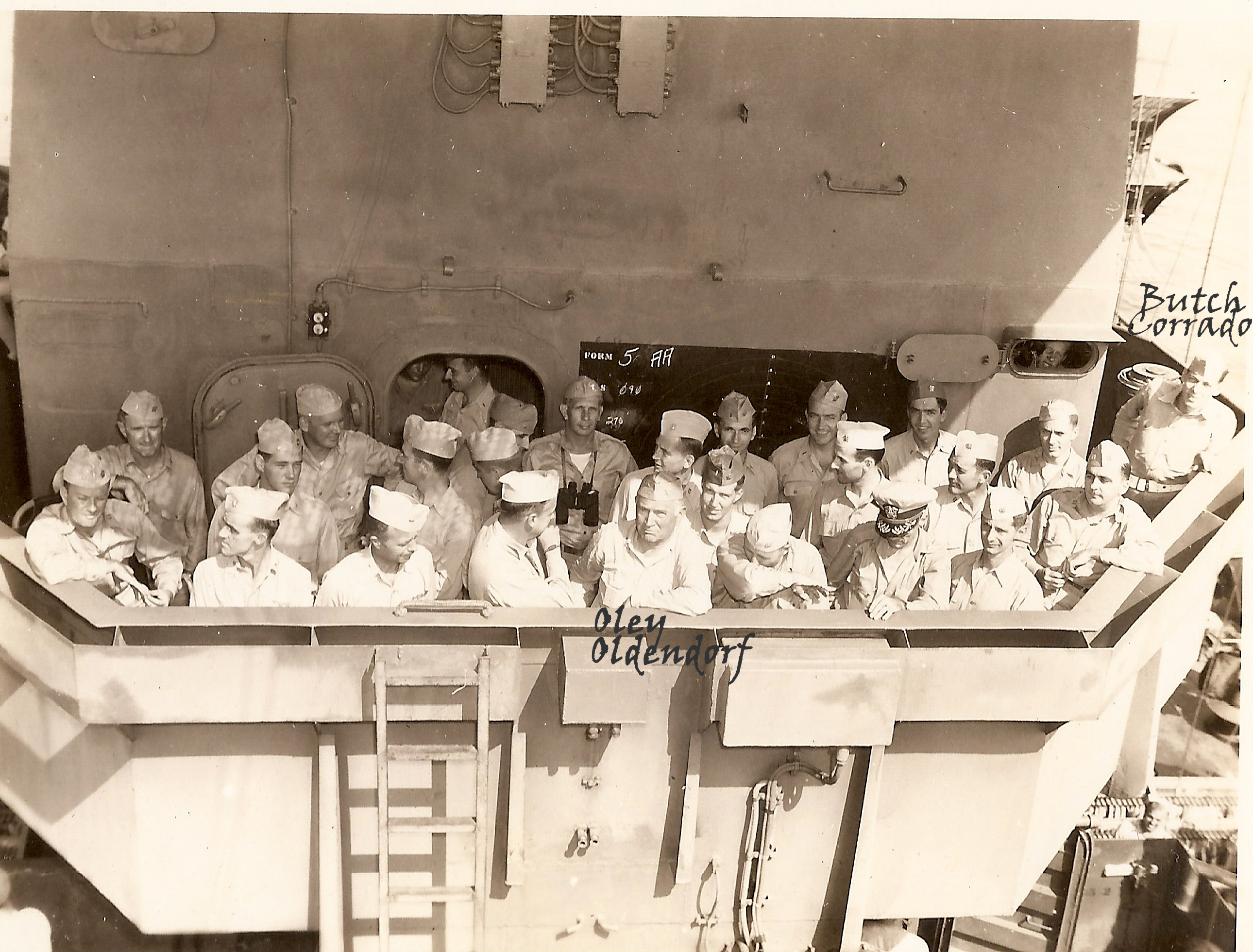
Vice Admiral Jesse B. Oldendorf (center) with his Flag Personnel on the Flag Bridge of USS Tennessee in August 1945 at Okinawa

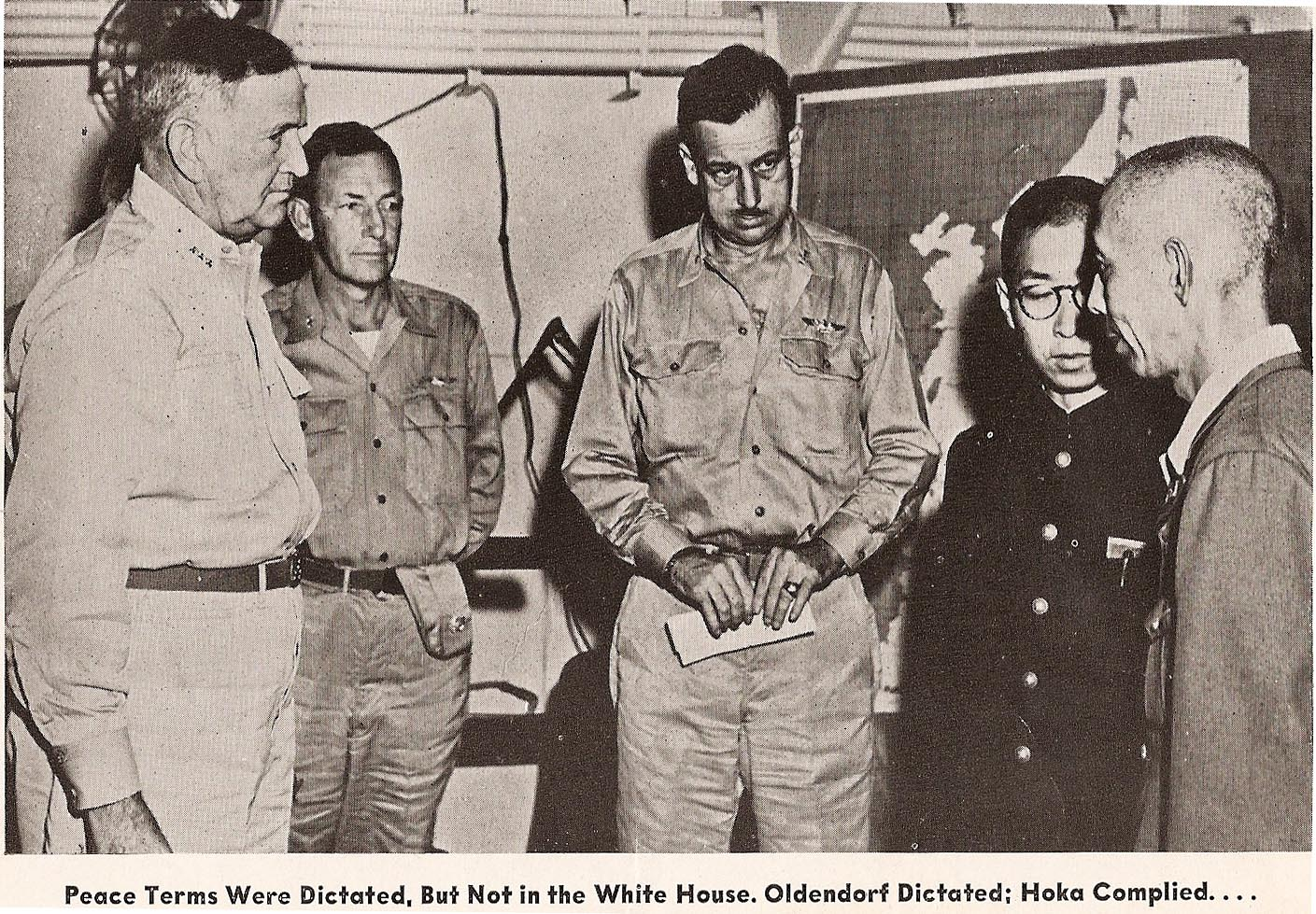
Vice Admiral Jesse B. Oldendorf dictates the terms of surrender to Vice Admiral Hoka and Rear Admiral Yofai on 22 September 1945 at Wakayama, Honshū, Japan.

On 24 October 1944, Oldendorf was the commander of Task Group 77.2 at the Battle of Surigao Strait. From aboard his flagship USS Louisville he led the defeat of the Japanese Southern Force. He deployed his powerful force of battleships and cruisers in a classic battle line formation across the Surigao Strait, crossing the T of his opponent. The Japanese battleships Fusō and Yamashiro were sunk, and Vice Admiral Shoji Nishimura was killed. Oldendorf's action prevented the Japanese from bringing their battle fleet into Surigao Strait and attacking the beachheads on Leyte Island. He later explained his tactics to the New York Times: "My theory was that of the old-time gambler: Never give a sucker a chance." For this action, Oldendorf was awarded the Navy Cross. In 1959 Admiral Oldendorf provided commentary on his planning for the battle:

... Admiral Kinkaid's order to prepare for night action came as no surprise. ... It was obvious that the objective of the Japanese Forces was the destruction of our transports and that my mission was to protect them at all costs. In order to accomplish my mission, the force under my command must be interposed to between the enemy and the transports. I realized that I must not lose sight of my mission no matter how much I might be tempted to engage in a gunnery duel with him.

I selected the position of the battle line off Hingatungan Point because it gave me the maximum sea room available and restricted the enemy's movements. This position also permitted me to cover the eastern entrance to the Gulf should the Central Force under Admiral Kurita arrive ahead of the Southern Force. I selected the battle plan from the General Tactical Instructions and modified it to meet the conditions existing, i.e., lack of sea room to maneuver and possible enemy action. ... I thought that quite possibly he planned to slip some of his light forces into the Gulf by passing them to the eastward of Hibuson Island after the battle line was engaged. For that reason I stationed the preponderance of my light forces on the left flank. One duty which was never delegated to my staff was the drafting of battle plans.

— US Naval Institute Proceedings
April 1959

On 15 December 1944, Oldendorf was promoted to vice admiral and made commander of Battleship Squadron 1. He commanded battleships in the landings at Lingayen. On 6 January 1945, Oldendorf, together with his guest British admiral Bruce Fraser, survived a destructive kamikaze strike on the bridge of USS New Mexico. He was wounded, breaking his collar bone, at Ulithi on 11 March 1945, when his barge hit a buoy. Oldendorf assumed command of Task Force 95 in July, and led this force on two sweeps of the East China Sea. He was wounded, breaking several ribs, when his flagship Pennsylvania was torpedoed by a Japanese aircraft on 12 August 1945. On 22 September 1945, Oldendorf commanded the occupation of Wakayama and dictated terms of surrender to Vice Admiral Hoka and Rear Admiral Yofai.

== Post-World War II life ==
From November 1945, Oldendorf commanded the 11th Naval District. In 1946 he assumed command of the San Diego Naval Base. From 1947 until his retirement in 1948 he commanded the Western Sea Frontier and the United States Navy reserve fleets at San Francisco. He retired in September 1948 at which time he was promoted to Admiral.

Oldendorf resided in Mount Vernon, Virginia, where he owned a large plot of land. He died on 27 April 1974 in Portsmouth, Virginia. The destroyer USS Oldendorf was named in his honor.

== Awards ==

1st Row		Navy Cross	Navy Distinguished Service Medal with two gold stars	
2nd Row	Army Distinguished Service Medal	Legion of Merit with two gold stars	Purple Heart	Victory Medal
3rd Row	American Defense Service Medal with "FLEET" clasp	American Campaign Medal	European-African-Middle Eastern Campaign Medal	Asiatic-Pacific Campaign Medal with ten battle stars
4th Row	World War II Victory Medal	Navy Occupation Medal	Philippine Liberation Medal	Philippine Independence Medal

== Bibliography ==
- Ancell, R. Manning; Miller, Christine (1996). The Biographical Dictionary of World War II Generals and Flag Officers: The US Armed Forces. Westport, Connecticut: Greenwood Press. ISBN 0-313-29546-8. OCLC 33862161.
- Department of the Navy - Office of Public Information (1945). Navy Cross: Officers and Enlisted Men of the United States Navy Awarded the Navy Cross. December 7, 1941–July 1, 1945. Washington, D.C.: US Navy Office of Public Information.
- Feuer, A.B. (1999). The U.S. Navy in World War I: Combat at Sea and in the Air. Westport, Connecticut: Praeger. ISBN 978-0-275-96212-8. OCLC 464561284.
- Frank, Richard B. (2011). Picking Winners?, Naval History Magazine - June 2011 Volume 25, Number 3. US Naval Institute.
- Ireland, Bernard; Gerrard, Howard (2006). Leyte Gulf 1944 The World's Greatest Sea Battle. Osprey Publishing. ISBN 978-1-84176-978-3. OCLC 475193960.
- Herder, Brian Lane (2020). The Naval Siege of Japan 1945: War Plan Orange Triumphant. Oxford: Osprey Publishing. ISBN 9781472840363.
- Morison, Samuel Eliot (1958). Leyte June 1994-January 1945. United States Naval Operations in World War II. Vol. XII. Boston, Massachusetts: Little, Brown and Company. ISBN 978-0-7858-1313-2. OCLC 7309630.
- Reynolds, Clark B. (1978). Famous American Admirals. Annapolis, Maryland: US Naval Institute Press. ISBN 978-1-55750-006-9. OCLC 3912797.
- Reynolds, Clark B. (2005). On the Warpath in the Pacific: Admiral Jocko Clark and the Fast Carriers. Annapolis, Maryland: US Naval Institute Press. ISBN 978-1-59114-716-9. OCLC 58454430.
- Sloan, Bill (2005). Brotherhood of heroes : the Marines at Peleliu, 1944 : the bloodiest battle of the Pacific War. New York, New York: Simon & Schuster. ISBN 0-7432-6009-0. OCLC 57236282.
- Thomas, Evan (2006). Sea of Thunder: Four Commanders and the Last Great Naval Campaign 1941-1945. New York, New York: Simon & Schuster. ISBN 978-0-7432-5221-8. OCLC 69672072.
- Tully, Anthony P. (2009). Battle of Surigao Strait. Bloomington, Indiana: Indiana University Press. ISBN 978-0-253-35242-2. OCLC 234257241.
- USS Tennessee (1946). USS Tennessee, December 7, 1941-December 7, 1945 (Cruise Book). Clark Printing House.
