= Idalis =

Idalis may refer to:

People named "Idalis" or "Idalys"

- Idalis DeLeón (b. 1966), an American actress, singer, and television host
- Idalys Ortiz (b. 1989), a Cuban judoka (judo practitioner) and Olympic medal winner

Ships

- USS Idalis (SP-270), a United States navy patrol vessel and training ship in commission from 1917 to 1919
