= Admiral Clark =

Admiral Clark may refer to:

- Charles Edgar Clark (1843–1922), U.S. Navy rear admiral
- George Ramsey Clark (1857–1945), U.S. Navy rear admiral
- Joseph J. Clark (1893–1971), U.S. Navy admiral
- Vern Clark (born 1944), U.S. Navy admiral

== See also ==
- Philip Clarke (Royal Navy officer) (1898–1966), British Royal Navy rear admiral
