= Edward Hale Campbell =

United States Navy admiral and judge advocate

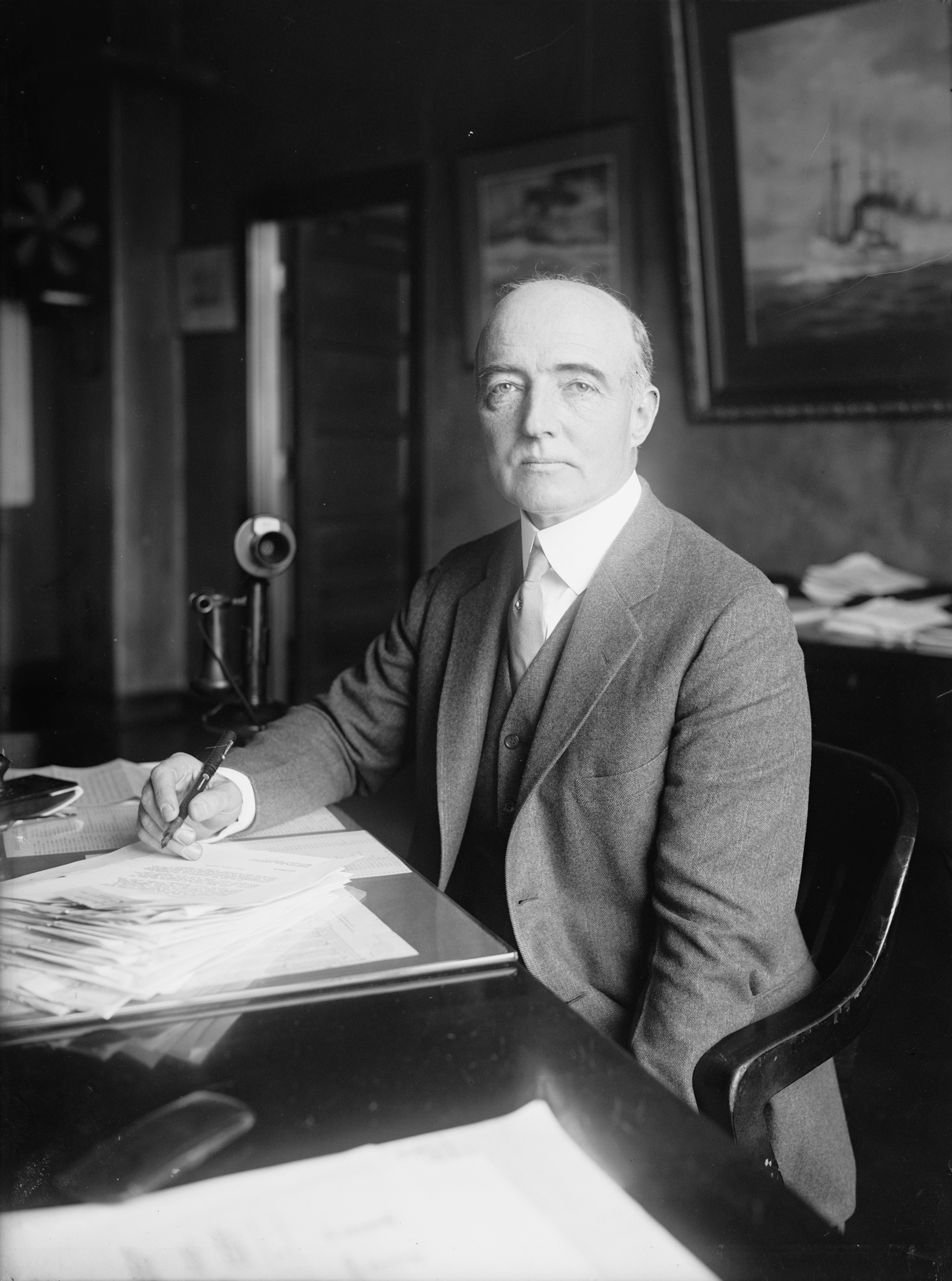
- Rear Admiral E.H. Campbell, Judge Advocate General (1925)
- Born: October 4, 1872; South Bend, Indiana, US
- Died: December 11, 1946 (aged 74); Medina, Washington, US
- Burial place: Arlington National Cemetery
- Spouse: Lilian Strong
- Military career
- Allegiance: United States
- Service years: 1893–1936
- Rank: Vice Admiral
- Awards: Navy Cross

Edward Hale Campbell (October 4, 1872 – December 11, 1946) was a vice admiral in the United States Navy. He served in the Spanish–American War and World War I.

== Early life and education ==
Edward Campbell was born in South Bend, Indiana on October 4, 1872, to Myron and Abbie Campbell.

== Career ==
Campbell graduated from the United States Naval Academy in 1893 and would later be assigned to the USS Baltimore (C-3).

During the Spanish–American War, he served off the coast of Central America. Following the war, he served aboard the USS Iowa (BB-4) and the USS Indiana (BB-1) before being assigned to assist in the fitting-out of the USS Milwaukee (C-21). In 1907, he was named Judge Advocate General of the Navy. He served in this position until 1909, when he left to assist in the fitting-out of the USS North Dakota (BB-29).

During World War I, Campbell commanded the USS Charleston (C-22). Following this assignment, he would take command of the Naval Training Station, Newport.

He returned to his former position of Judge Advocate General for the years 1925–1929. In 1929, he would take command of the Special Service Squadron. From 1934 to 1935, he served as commander of the Scouting Force. Later, he took command of the 12th Naval District. He retired on November 1, 1936.

== Awards ==
He received the Navy Cross for actions during World War I.

== Personal life ==
He married Lilian Strong. Together, they had 2 children: Georgiana Campbell and Edward S. Campbell.

== Death and legacy ==
Campbell died on December 11, 1946, in Medina, Washington. He is buried at Arlington National Cemetery with Lilian and their daughter, Georgiana.

Military offices
Preceded by Samuel Willauer Black Diehl	Judge Advocate General of the Navy; 1907–1909	Succeeded by Robert Lee Russell
Preceded by Julian Lane Latimer	Judge Advocate General of the Navy; 1925–1929	Succeeded by David F. Sellers
