= Pelham Bay Naval Training Station =

- Rodman's Neck, Pelham Bay Park, The Bronx in United States

Site information
- Owner: City of New York
- Operator: US Navy

Location
- Coordinates: 40°51′58″N 73°48′37″W

Site history
- Built: 1917
- Built by: Ewing & Allen, Architects
- In use: 1917–1919
- Fate: Demolished

Garrison information
- Past commanders: Commander William B. Franklin (until 25 February 1919); Captain Julian Lane Latimer, 25 February 1919 -

Pelham Bay Naval Training Station was a World War I-era United States Navy training facility located on Rodman's Neck, a peninsula at Pelham Bay Park in the Bronx, New York City. Located near City Island and Westchester County, it was operational from 1917 to 1919.

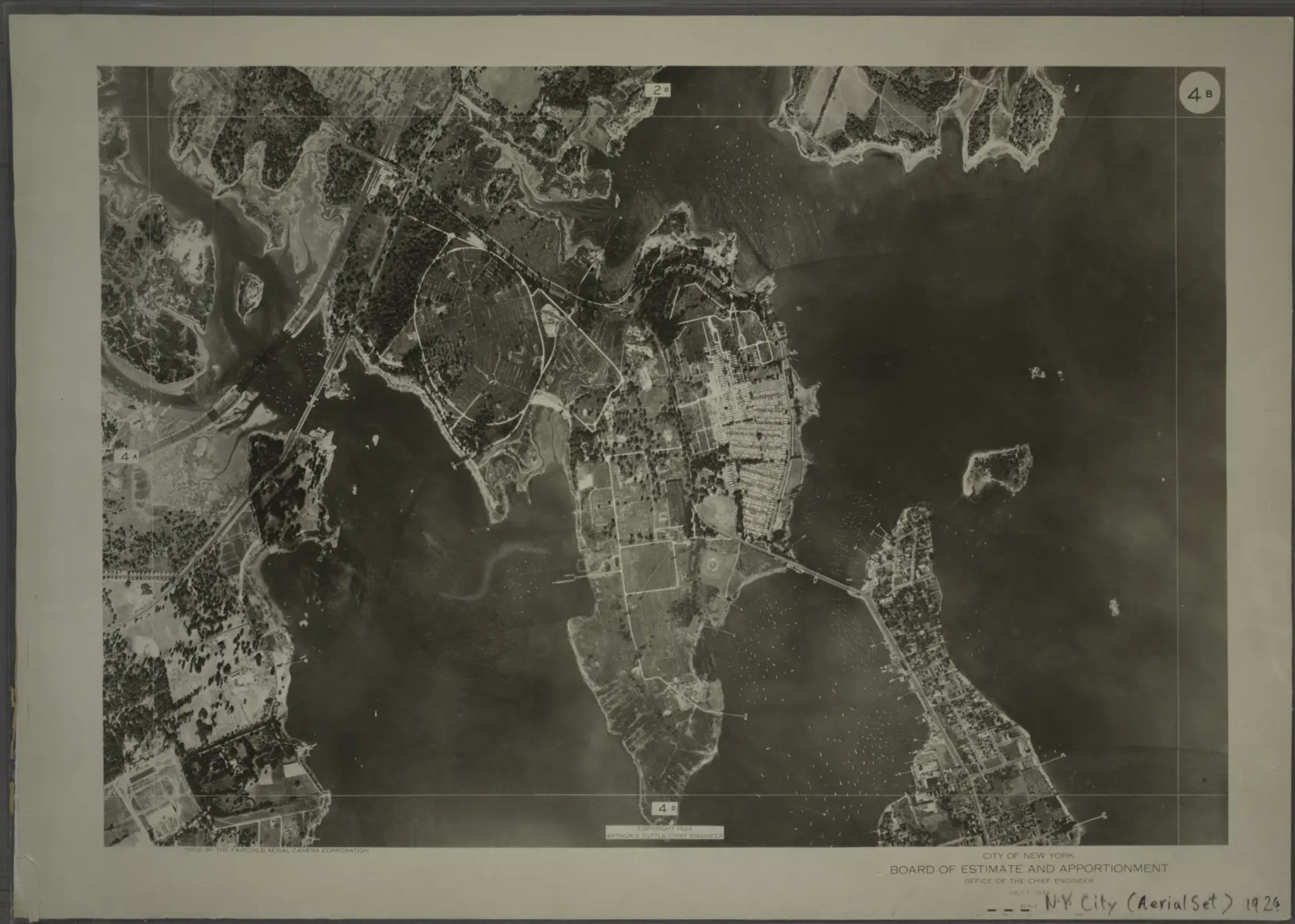
1924 Aerial Photo

== History ==
Prior to the creation of the Pelham Bay Naval Training Station, a national guard base was set up in the heart of Pelham Bay Park. The 280 acre site was designed by the architectural firm of Ewing & Allen and included a ninety acre hospital.

The camp also featured entertainment facilities provided by the Knights of Columbus, the Y.M.C.A., and other organizations including the American Red Cross and the American Library Association.

=== Curriculum ===
The camp offered a number of sequential training courses, with mastery of a given course being required to advance to the next one.

- First: Inoculation period of 21 days in the Isolation Camp (also known as the "Probation Camp"). During this time, the trainee also learned about naval regulations and some basic seamanship topics.
- Second: Month-long seamanship course.
- Third: If qualified - Three weeks of either Petty Officer's School, Radio school, Quartermaster School, Gunnery School, or Boatswain Mate schools.
- Fourth: If qualified - Two months of Officers' Material School or the Naval Auxiliary School.

=== Influenza pandemic of 1918 ===
The camp suffered from the Influenza pandemic of 1918 from late 21 September through late 21 October 1918, and again in December 1918. There were 2,399 cases of influenza, with a total of 145 deaths.

== Personnel ==
=== Commandants ===
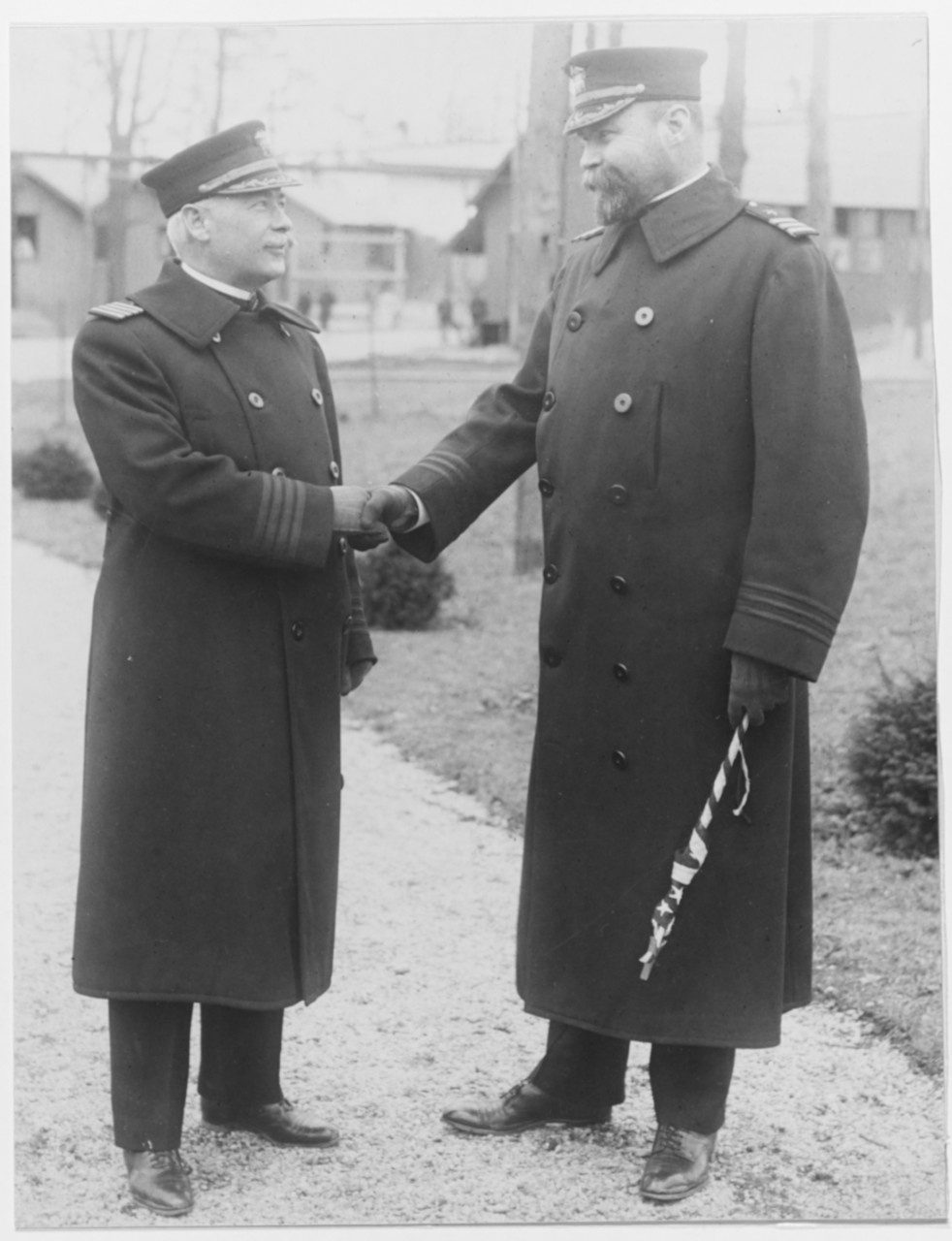
Pelham Bay Naval Training Station turned over from Commander William B. Franklin to Captain Julian L. Latimer.

- Commander William B. Franklin until 25 February 1919
- Captain Julian Lane Latimer, captain of USS Rhode Island, assumed command of the Pelham Bay Naval Training Station New York, 25 February 1919 - later Judge Advocate General of the Navy 1921 - 1925

=== Librarians ===
A number of Queens Borough Public Library staff members took a leave of absence, and were placed at the Naval station via the efforts of the American Library Association. The station's library staff included:

- Blanche Galloway - Librarian. Queens Borough Public Library Jamaica Branch Librarian.
- Wilhelmina Harper - Assistant librarian. Queens Borough Public Library Jamaica Branch Children's librarian.
- Amy E. Doncourt - Hospital librarian. Queens Borough Public Library Flushing Branch assistant librarian.

=== Other personnel ===
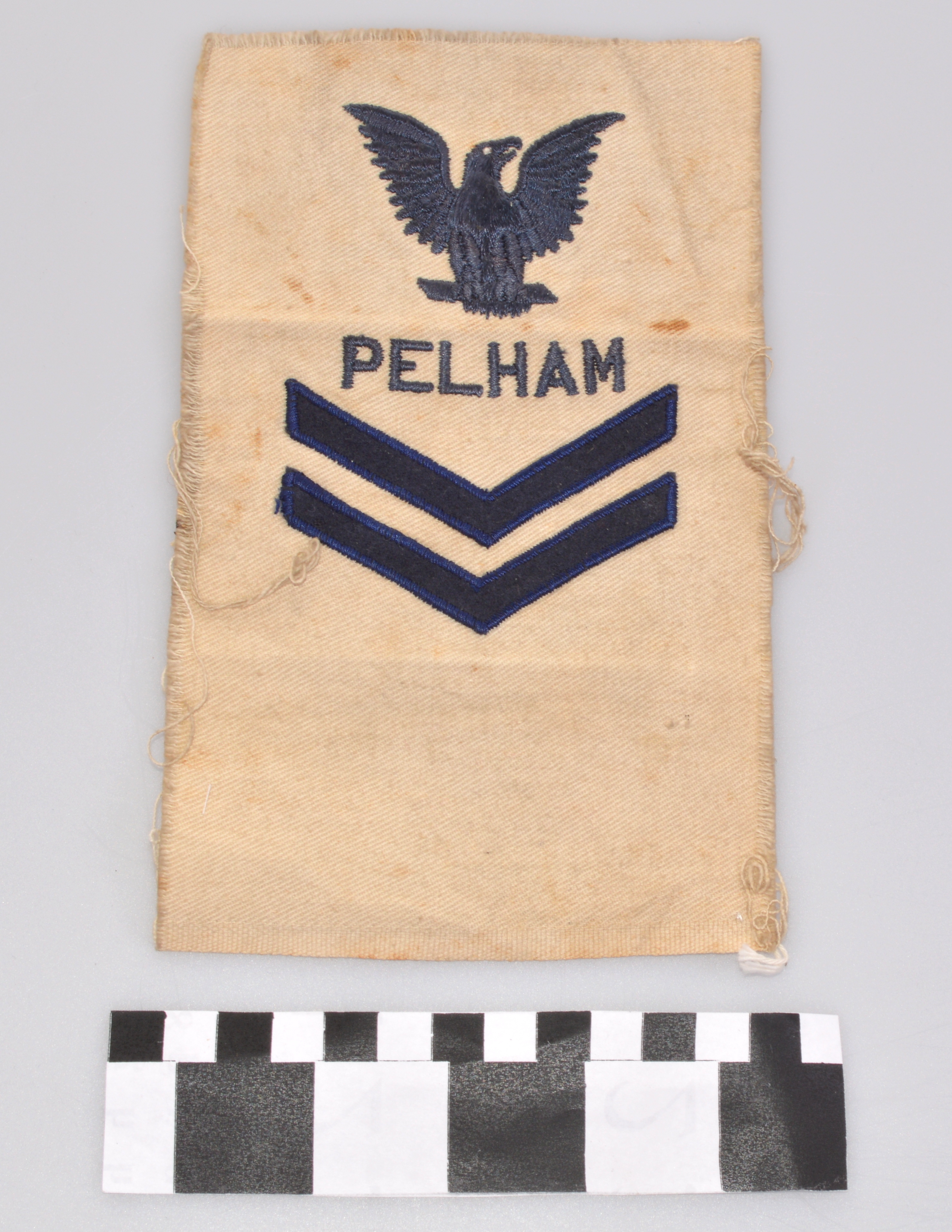
Pelham Bay Navy Second Class Patch of Fred Dedert

- Richard W. Dorgan - served at the naval station.
- James F. Duffy - served at the naval station.
- Humphrey Bogart - The actor was one of the trainees.
- Edward G. Robinson - The actor was one of the trainees.

== See also ==
- USS Idalis (SP-270) - A Bronx built ship that was used for training and patrol duties.
- J. Rich Steers, Inc. - Then known as Henry Steers, Inc. constructed some or all of the barracks.

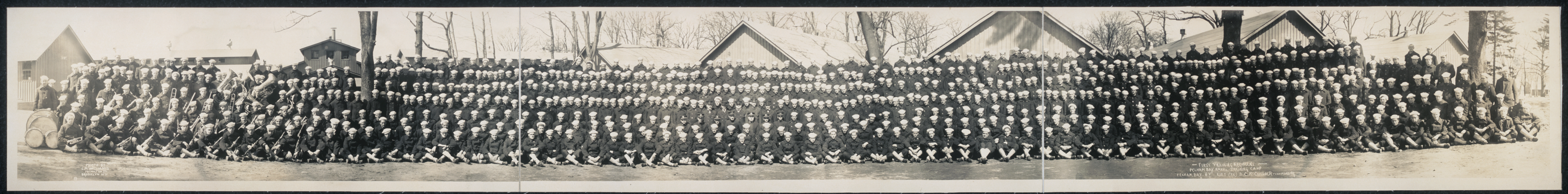
First Training Regiment, Pelham Bay Naval Training Camp, Bronx, NYC

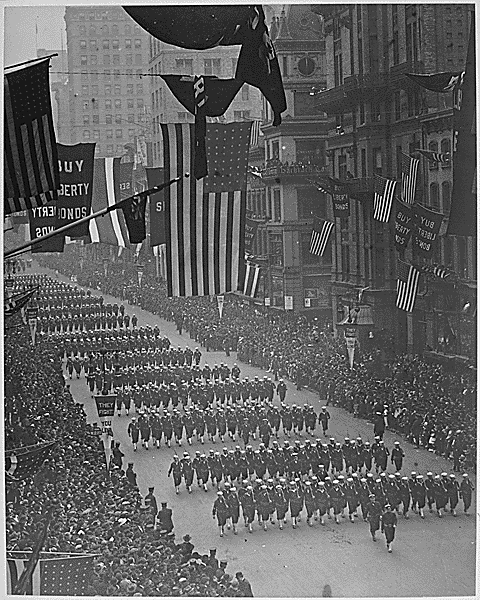
Sailors from Pelham Bay Naval Training Station marching down Fifth Avenue in the Fourth Liberty Loan Parade, New York City.

1908 map of the earlier Naval Reserve training camp at Pelham Bay Park.
