= Wilhelmina Harper =

American writer

Wilhelmina Harper (April 21, 1884 – December 23, 1973) was a children's librarian, and a children's author. She was a supervisor of children's work for the Kern County Free Library.

== Early life ==
Wilhelmina Harper was born on April 21, 1884, in Farmington, Maine, the daughter of Professor William Harper and Bertha Tauber (1853–1945).

She graduated from Teachers College, Columbia University, and the New York State Library.

== Career ==
Harper started working as a children's librarian in 1908 at the New York's Queens Borough Public Library. She conducted story hours, gave talks in public schools, instructed school classes in the use of library and organized clubs for boys and girls.

In 1918 she was first assistant at Camp Library, Pelham Bay Naval Training Station, in New York, and in 1919 served overseas as the library organizer for the Young Men's Christian Association at Brest, France. In 1920 she was employed by the American Red Cross in Chicago.

Harper was for ten years engaged as Children's Librarian in the Greater New York area. In 1921 she moved to California and worked in the libraries in Bakersfield, California, and Redwood City, California. She was Supervisor of children's work for the Kern County Free Library. In 1929 she taught a summer-school class in children's literature and storytelling. She retired in 1954.

Harper was a successful children's author in the 1930s and 1940s, and published more than 40 compilations of children and young adult stories, including:

- Around the hearth fire, stories of favorite holidays selected from the Youth's companion (1931)
- Boys' Stories from the Youth's Companion
- Down in Dixie, stories from the South Central States (1940)
- Easter chimes: stories for Easter and the spring season (1942)
- Fillmore Folk Tales
- Ghosts and Goblins: Stories for Hallowe'en and Other Times (1936)
- Girl of Tiptop: and other stories (1929)
- Girls' Stories from the Youth's Companion
- The Gunniwolf, and other merry tales Illustrated by Barbara Upton in 1918, Illustrated by Kate Seredy in 1935
- The harvest feast: stories of Thanksgiving yesterday and today (1938)
- A Little Book of Necessary Ballads Illustrated by Helen B. Evers (1930)
- The Lonely Little Pig and other animal tales (1939)
- The Magic Fairy Tales
- Merry Christmas to you: stories for Christmas (1935)
- Off Duty
- The selfish giant and other stories (1935)
- Stories of the old West (1940)
- Story Hour Favorites
- Treasure Trails (a series of four school readers)
- Uncle Sam's story book : adventures of yesterday's boys and girls (1940)
- Where the redbird flies: stories from the southeastern states (1946)
- Winding roads (1928)
- Wings of Courage: And Other Stories for Girl Scouts (1941)

She also published articles pertaining to library work.

Harper was a member of the American Library Association and the California Library Association.

== Personal life ==
Harper lived in New York City, and moved to California in 1921, living at 2714 Chester Lane, Bakersfield, California.

She died on December 23, 1973, and is buried at Alta Mesa Memorial Park, Palo Alto, California.
