= Special Service Squadron =

The Special Service Squadron was a component of the United States Navy that operated from 1920 to 1940, primarily patrolling the Caribbean Sea to safeguard American interests, including the Panama Canal, amid political instability in Central America and the Caribbean. Established as an independent command, it conducted gunboat diplomacy, supported U.S. interventions (such as in Nicaragua), and maintained a presence along Central and South American coasts. It was headquartered in Balboa, Panama Canal Zone.

Records of the U.S. Atlantic Fleet have correspondence from the Special Service Squadron in 1907. The Special Service Squadron was stood up as a separate command from the fleet on September 25, 1920. Its purpose was to protect the Canal and American interests both in the Caribbean and on the Pacific coast of Central America (and it remained a separate command when the Atlantic and Pacific fleets were combined as the United States Fleet in 1922). The squadron comprised small, older vessels like gunboats (e.g., USS Sacramento (PG-19), USS Asheville (PG-21)) and destroyers, serving as flagships for operations including training exercises and protection during regional conflicts. It was abolished in 1940 as part of broader U.S. naval reorganizations ahead of World War II.

== Commanders ==
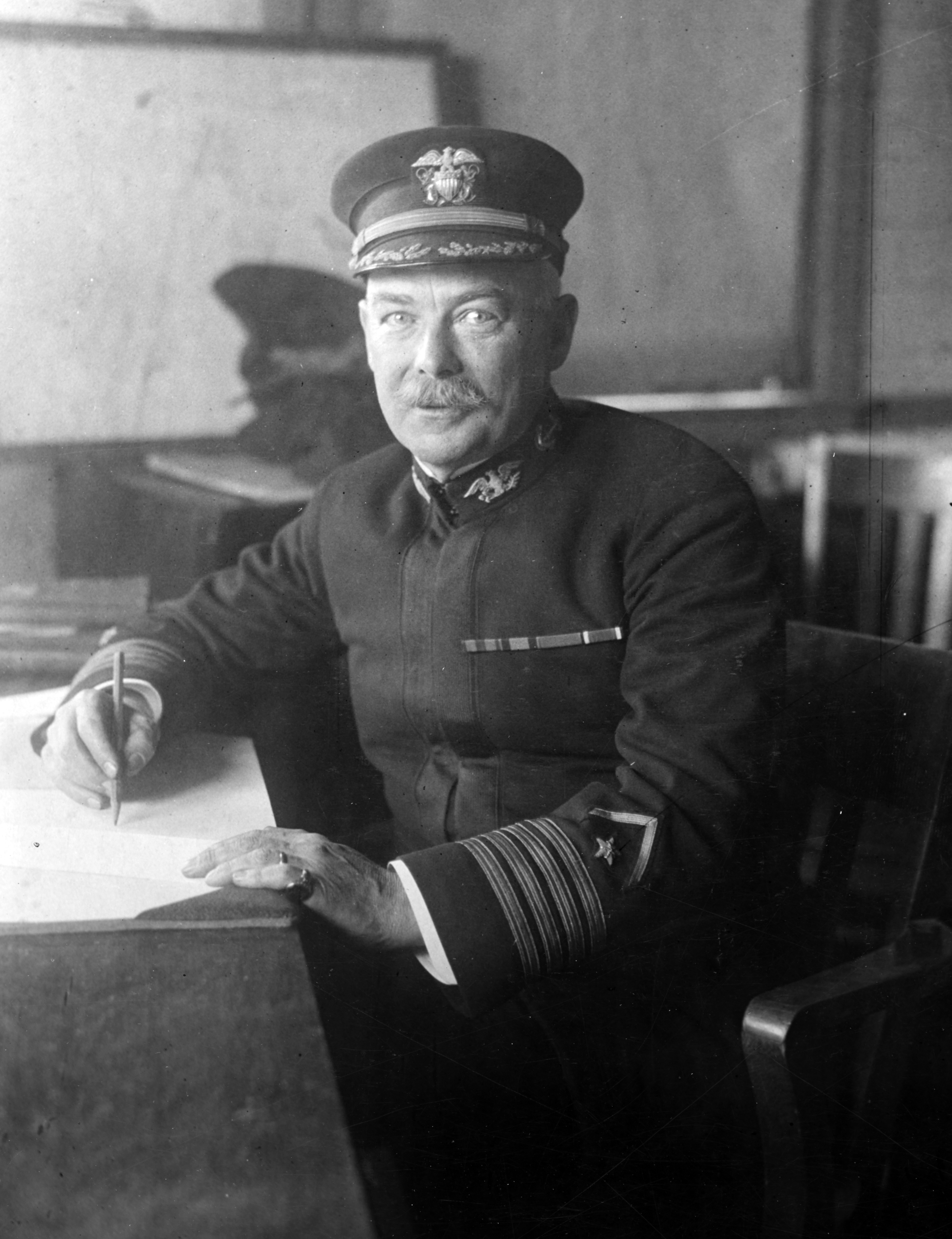
Captain Julian L. Latimer. Photo taken while serving as Commandant of the Pelham Bay Naval Training Station, 1919.

Commanders of the Divisions, Atlantic Fleet

- Rear Admiral Willard H. Brownson 8 Jul 1905 - 15 Oct 1906
- Rear Adimral Charles Stockton 1906 - 1907
- Rear Admiral C.H. Hockson 1907
- Rear Admiral William Kimball 1908 - 1910
- Rear Admiral Sidney Augustus Staunton 5 Apr 1910 - Aug 1911
- Rear Admiral Austin M. Knight 1912 - 1913
- Rear Admiral Henry T. Mayo 1913 - 1914
- Rear Admiral Cameron M. Winslow 23 Apr 1914 - 21 Aug 1910
- commander Cook/Chef Engineer
- Rear Admiral Spencer S. Wood

Commanders of the Special Service Squadron

- Rear Admiral Henry F. Bryan 12 Oct 1920 - 31 Dec 1921
- Rear Admiral Casey Bruce Morgan 1921 - 22 Apr 1922
- Rear Admiral William C. Cole 22 Apr 1922 – 18 Jul 1923
- Rear Admiral John H. Dayton 18 Jul 1923 - 19 May 1925
- Rear Admiral Julian Lane Latimer 19 May 1925 - 4 Sep 1926
- Rear Admiral David F. Sellers 4 Sep 1926 - 12 May 1929
- Rear Admiral Edward H. Campbell 12 May 1929 - 17 Jan 1931
- Rear Admiral Arthur St. Clair Smith 17 Jan 1931 - 16 Jun 1933
- Rear Admiral Charles Seymour Freeman 16 Jun 1933 - 1 Jul 1935
- Rear Admiral George Julian Meyers 1 Jul 1935 - 1 Aug 1936
- Rear Admiral Yancey S. Williams 1 Aug 1936 - 23 Aug 1938
- Rear Admiral John W. Wilcox, Jr. 23 Aug 1938 - 3 Aug 1940
- Rear Admiral Henry K. Hewitt 3 Aug 1940 - Nov 1940

== See also ==
- Service Squadron
