= David F. Sellers =

US Navy admiral (1874-1949)

David Foote Sellers
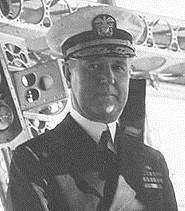
- Born: David Foote Sellers; February 4, 1874; Austin, Texas, U.S.
- Died: January 27, 1949 (aged 74); Bethesda, Maryland, U.S.
- Military career
- Allegiance: United States of America
- Branch: United States Navy
- Service years: 1894–1938
- Rank: Admiral
- Commands: USS Stewart (DD-13); USS Birmingham (CL-2); USS Salem (CL-3); USS Wisconsin (BB-9); USS Agamemnon; USS Maryland (BB-46); Special Service Squadron; U.S. Navy Judge Advocate General; Battleship Division One; Battleships Battle Force; United States Fleet; U.S. Naval Academy
- Conflicts: Spanish–American War; Philippine–American War; World War I Banana Wars
- Awards: Navy Cross; Navy Distinguished Service Medal

David F. Sellers (February 4, 1874 – January 27, 1949) was an admiral in the United States Navy. He was the first person from New Mexico to graduate from the United States Naval Academy.

== Biography ==
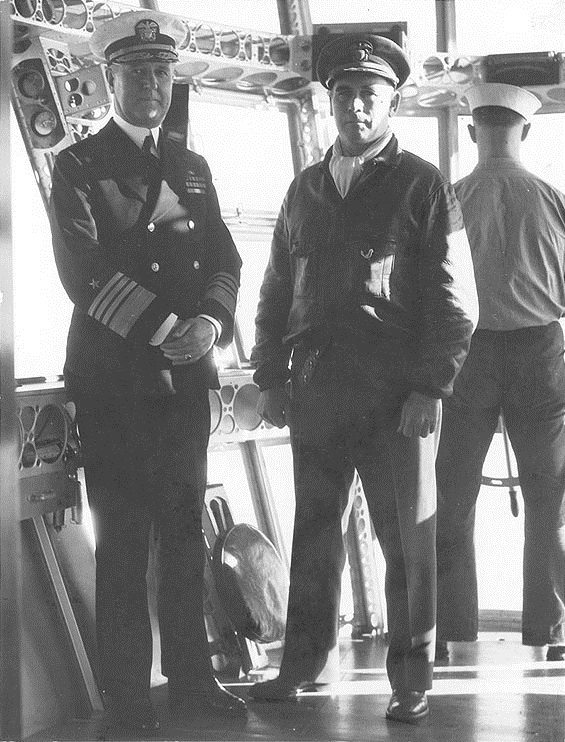
Admiral Sellers (left) in the control cabin of the airship USS Macon alongside the ship's commanding officer, Commander Alger H. Dresel.

David Foote Sellers was a native of Austin, Texas. He joined the United States Navy in 1890 and was appointed to the U.S. Naval Academy from New Mexico. Sellers graduated in 1894, the first from New Mexico to graduate from the Academy, standing fifth in his class of 47. After his mandatory two-year cruise aboard the New York, he returned to take his final exams, passed with honors, and finished second in his class overall. After graduation, he served in various sea assignments until 1898, including service on the Massachusetts, Essex, Alliance, Independence and Philadelphia. During the Spanish–American War he participated in the Samoan Campaign and the Philippine–American War while serving aboard the New York. From 1904 until 1907 he commanded the Stewart. Following his destroyer service he was assigned shore duty at the Bureau of Navigation, was a Naval Aide to the White House and then served on the staff of the Commander-In-Chief, United States Asiatic Fleet, Rear Admiral William S. Cowles.

During 1914 until 1915, Sellers served as executive officer of the battleship Arkansas. He then commanded the cruisers Birmingham and Salem and attended the Naval War College. Promoted to captain, Sellers served as commanding officer of the battleship Wisconsin in 1917. From 1918 through the end of First World War, he commanded the transport Agamemnon. Sellers was awarded the Navy Cross for his service during that war. Following the war, he taught at the Naval War College and served as Naval Aide to Secretary of the Navy Edwin C. Denby. Sellers commanded the battleship Maryland from 1922 until 1923. In 1923, he was a member of the Court of Inquiry investigating the Honda Point disaster.

Sellers was promoted to rear admiral in 1927 and served as Commander, Special Service Squadron during the Nicaraguan Uprising, earning the Navy Distinguished Service Medal. Following his service with the squadron, he served as Judge Advocate General of the Navy from 1929 until 1931. Then Commander, Battleship Division One from 1931–1932. In 1932, Sellers was promoted to vice admiral and was assigned as Commander, Battleships Battle Force, United States Fleet. He was promoted to Admiral on June 10, 1933, and assigned as Commander-in-Chief United States Fleet and continued to serve until June 18, 1934. In 1934 he was reassigned as Superintendent of the U.S. Naval Academy and served in this capacity until his retirement.

He retired on March 1, 1938 and lived in Washington, D.C. He died from a cerebral hemorrhage at the Bethesda Naval Hospital in 1949 and was buried in Arlington National Cemetery.

== Decorations ==
=== Navy Cross Citation ===

The President of the United States of America takes pleasure in presenting the Navy Cross to Captain David Foote Sellers, United States Navy, for exceptionally meritorious service in a duty of great responsibility as Commanding Officer of the U.S.S. Agamemnon, engaged in the important, exacting and hazardous duty of transporting troops and supplies through waters infested with enemy submarines and mines; as Commanding Officer of the U.S.S. Wisconsin, in the Atlantic Fleet; and as Commander of the District Forces Afloat, Fifth Naval District.

=== Navy Distinguished Service Medal Citation ===
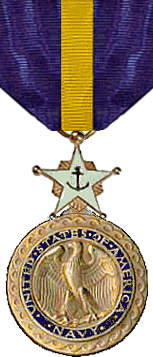

GENERAL ORDERS:

Bureau of Naval Personnel Information Bulletin No. 120 (December 21, 1929)

CITATION:

The President of the United States of America takes pleasure in presenting the Navy Distinguished Service Medal to Rear Admiral David Foote Sellers, United States Navy, for exceptionally meritorious service to the Government in a position of great responsibility as Commander, Special Service Squadron, from 8 July 1927 to 12 May 1929, during the disturbed conditions in the Republic of Nicaragua. Throughout this time Rear Admiral Sellers handled with great skill and diplomacy the many delicate situations that arose incident to the pacification of Nicaragua prior to the presidential election on 4 November 1928, during the election and subsequent to it. As the Senior Officer present he coordinated the activities of the Marine Brigade on shore, which was a part of his command, with the activities of the Nicaraguan Government, the Guardia Nacional, and the officers of the United States Army on election duty. In the discharge of his duty of protecting lives and property he displayed strength and initiative coupled with wisdom and tempered by kindness and humanity.

== Personal life ==
In 1905, he married Anita Clay Evans (1877–1954), the daughter of Henry Clay Evans.

== Namesake ==
- USS Sellers, a guided missile destroyer, was named in his honor.

== See also ==
- List of United States Navy four-star admirals

Academic offices
Preceded by Thomas C. Hart	Superintendent of United States Naval Academy; 1934–1938	Succeeded by Wilson Brown
Military offices
Preceded by Richard H. Leigh	Commander in Chief, United States Fleet; June 10, 1933 – June 18, 1934	Succeeded by Joseph M. Reeves
Preceded by Edward Hale Campbell	Judge Advocate General of the Navy; 1929–1932	Succeeded by Orin G. Murfin
