= USS William C. Cole =

Buckley-class destroyer escort

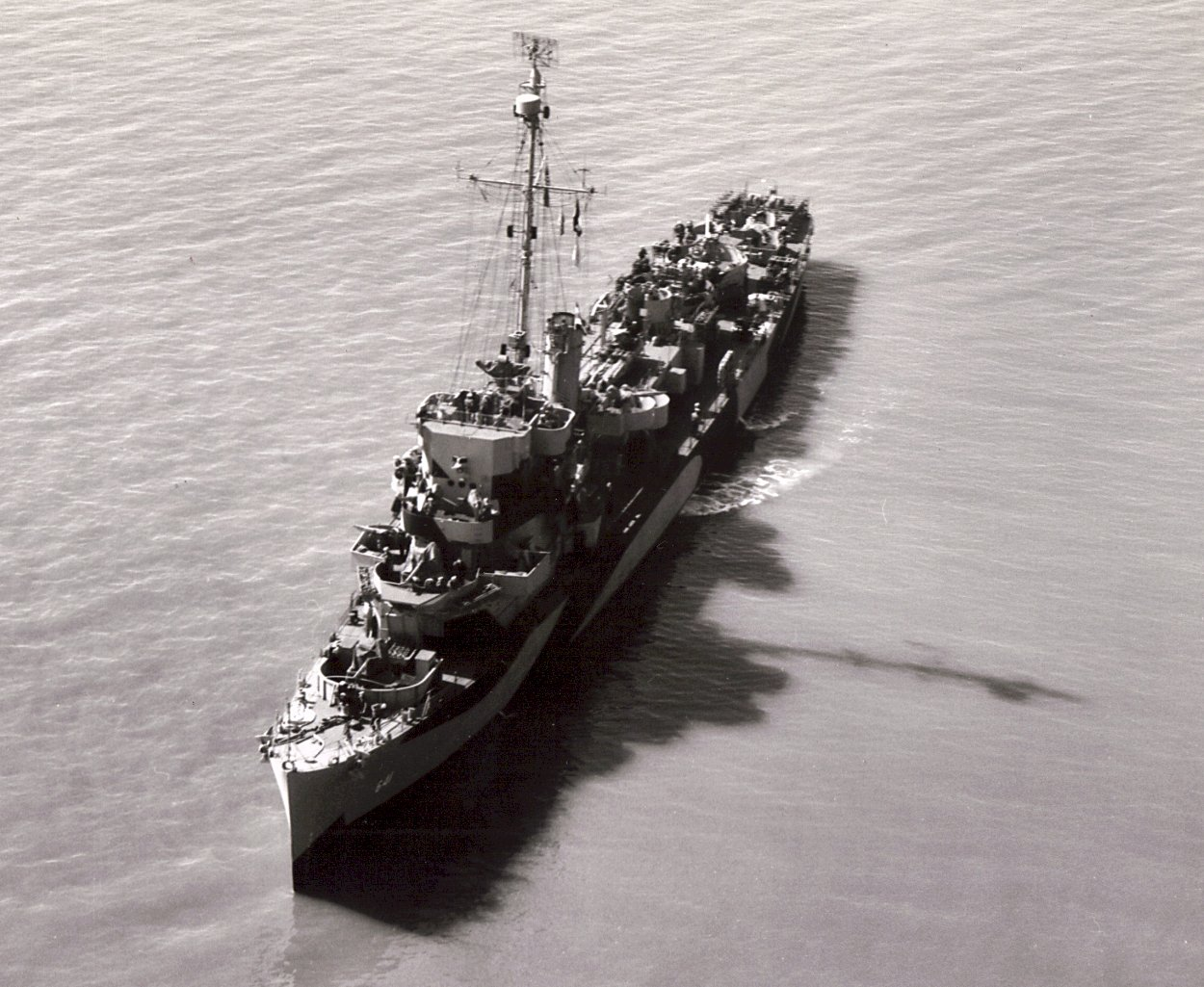

History

United States
- Name: USS William C. Cole
- Namesake: William Carey Cole
- Builder: Bethlehem Shipbuilding Corporation, San Francisco
- Laid down: 5 September 1943
- Launched: 29 December 1943
- Commissioned: 12 May 1944
- Decommissioned: 13 March 1948
- Stricken: 1 March 1972
- Honors and awards: 1 battle star (World War II)
- Fate: Sold for scrap, 20 November 1972

General characteristics
- Class & type: Buckley-class destroyer escort
- Displacement: 1,400 long tons (1,422 t) standard; 1,740 long tons (1,768 t) full load
- Length: 306 ft (93 m)
- Beam: 36 ft 9 in (11.20 m)
- Draft: 13 ft 6 in (4.11 m)
- Propulsion: GE turbo-electric drive; 12,000 shp (8.9 MW); 2 propellers
- Speed: 24 knots (44 km/h)
- Range: 4,940 nautical miles at 12 knots; (9,200 km at 22 km/h)
- Complement: 15 officers, 198 men
- Armament: 3 × 3 in (76 mm) DP guns, 3 × 21 in (53 cm) torpedo tubes, 1 × 1.1 in (28 mm) quad AA gun, 10 × 20 mm cannon, 1 × Hedgehog projector, 2 × depth charge tracks, 8 × K-gun depth charge projectors

USS William C. Cole (DE-641) was a Buckley-class destroyer escort of the United States Navy, named in honor of Vice Admiral William C. Cole (1868–1935).

William C. Cole was laid down on 5 September 1943 at San Francisco, California, by the Bethlehem Steel Co.; launched on 29 December 1943; sponsored by Mrs. William C. Cole, the widow of Adm. Cole; and commissioned on 12 May 1944.

== World War II ==
Following shakedown in the San Diego area, William C. Cole underwent post-shakedown availability at her builder's yard before departing the west coast on 19 July, bound for the Hawaiian Islands. After reaching Oahu, the new destroyer escort trained out of Pearl Harbor for the remainder of the month.

=== August 1944 – March 1945 ===
William C. Cole departed Oahu on 1 August in company with Snyder (DE-745), as part of the screen for the oilers Neches (AO-47) and Atascosa (AO-66); the seaplane tender Kenneth Whiting (AV-14); the escort carriers Bougainville (CVE-100) and Admiralty Islands (CVE-99); the refrigeration ship Aldebaran (AF-10); and the merchant freighter SS Cape Pillar. After delivering that convoy safety to Majuro in the Marshalls, Cole escorted Admiralty Islands and Bougainville back to Pearl Harbor.

After a five-day availability, William C. Cole departed Pearl Harbor with the destroyer escorts Melvin R. Nawman (DE-416) and Samuel B. Roberts (DE-413) in the screen for a Marshalls-bound merchant convoy. William C. Cole was detached on 28 August and escorted the freighter SS Cape Page to Kwajalein before she headed for Hawaii on 1 September. Upon her arrival at Pearl Harbor, the destroyer escort commenced a week's availability.

William C. Cole departed the Hawaiian Islands on 15 September and subsequently convoyed the escort carrier Copahee (CVE-12) to Manus Island, in the Admiralty Islands. On 25 September, Cole reported to Commander, South Pacific Forces, for duty.

Underway from Seeadler Harbor, Manus, on 1 October, William C. Cole and sister ship Gendreau (DE-639) sailed for the Solomon Islands. From 4 to 11 October, Cole trained out of Purvis Bay with the other ships of Escort Division 73 (CortDiv 73). One week later, on 18 October, the destroyer escort escorted SS Cape Johnson from Lunga Point, Guadalcanal, to Cape Torokina, Bougainville, before returning to Purvis Bay for upkeep and gunnery training that lasted for the remainder of October.

William C. Cole operated out of Purvis Bay into February 1945, performing local escort missions between Guadalcanal, Bougainville, and New Caledonia; ships escorted included SS Sea Cat, SS "Sea Snipe", General O. H. Ernst (AP-133), Wharton (AP-7), West Virginia (BB-48), General M. M. Patrick (AP-150), Windsor (APA-55), Ormsby (APA-49), and Crescent City (APA-21).

After gunnery exercises from 3 to 23 February, William C. Cole reported by dispatch on the 23d to Commander, 5th Fleet. From 24 February through the first week in March, she performed screening duties off the transport staging area, Lunga Point, Guadalcanal, protecting the transports of Amphibious Squadron 4 (PhibRon 4) during landing exercises in the vicinity. While the transports of PhibRon 4 loaded at Lunga Point, Cole screened them from 10 to 13 March. On the latter day, she received onward routing and proceeded for the Russell Islands.

On the 15th, the destroyer escort headed for Ulithi, in the Western Carolines, in company with Lang (DD-399), Stack (DD-406), and Paul G. Baker (DE-642), escorting various units of PhibRon 4. Detached on the 21st, William C. Cole joined Paul G. Baker to escort for the attack cargo ships, Theenim (AKA-63) and Lacerta (AKA-29), to the Marianas. After delivering their charges safely to Saipan, the two destroyer escorts proceeded immediately to Ulithi where they were replenished before sortieing with Carrier Division 22 (CarDiv 22) – less Sangamon (CVE-26) and Santee (CVE-29) – as part of the escort that included the destroyers Massey (DD-778), Drexler (DD-741), and Metcalf (DD-595). Relieved of escort and screening duties for the carriers on 31 March, William C. Cole subsequently joined other ships of CortDiv 73 escorting Transport Squadron 18 (TransRon 18) on its way to Okinawa.

=== Battle of Okinawa ===
The ships made their final approaches through the western islands off Okinawa and arrived off the beachhead by midday. Light enemy aircraft activity greeted the initial forces – activity that would, in time, become heavy and nearly ceaseless. Between 1 and 4 April, the ship went to general quarters numerous times during the many air raid alerts caused by enemy planes in the vicinity. William C. Cole downed one plane and assisted in downing two others.

Retiring from Okinawa on 5 April as an escort for Transport Division 42 (TransDiv 42), William C. Cole headed for Saipan. Upon arrival, the ship received routing to Ulithi where she took on stores. Underway again on 13 April, Cole sailed for Okinawa once more, this time in the screen for ships of TransDiv 56.

Detached from escort duties upon her arrival off the western invasion beaches on 17 April, William C. Cole soon commenced her activities as a vessel in the screen. She remained on screening stations in the vicinity of transport anchorages until retiring on the 26th in company with Bunch (APD-79), Mullany (DD-528), Charles Lawrence (APD-37), and Richard W. Suesens (DE-342), as escort for TransDiv 104. After reaching Ulithi on the 30th, Cole underwent four days of availability.

Returning to active duty upon completion of repairs, the destroyer escort steamed on a picket station off the island of Yap before returning to the Western Carolines on 13 May. The following day, in company with Chase (APD-54) and as escort for the battleship West Virginia and the heavy cruiser Tuscaloosa (CA-37), William C. Cole got underway to return to Okinawa. Arriving there on the 17th, she reported for screening duties.

While on station, William C. Cole observed moderate enemy air action from 19 to 23 May; but, on the 24th, she came under attack herself. Between 18:30 on the 24th and 06:00 on the 25th, the ship destroyed two enemy aircraft. First, a Nakajima Ki-43 "Oscar" attempted a suicide run while Cole was northeast of Ie Shima and crashed within a few feet of the destroyer escort's starboard beam. The plane passed so close that one of its wingtips bent a "spoon" of a torpedo tube mount which had been trained to starboard. The second plane, a Kawasaki Ki-61 "Tony", came in from the ship's starboard side and was taken under a heavy fire from the ship's 20-millimeter and 40-millimeter guns. Because the captain of the ship saw the danger and ordered the engines to be thrown in full reverse this attacker overshot the ship and crashed some thousand yards beyond its target.

=== June – August 1945 ===
On 30 May, William C. Cole loaded ammunition at Kerama Retto to replenish her depleted magazines before weighing anchor on the next day to sail to Saipan with a convoy of merchantmen. On 2 June, Ringness (APD-100) and William C. Cole rendezvoused at sea with a Ulithi-bound convoy, and they arrived at their destination on the 6th having safely delivered their charges. Upon fueling, Cole sailed for the Philippines, in company with the destroyer Shields (DD-596) and the destroyer escort George E. Davis (DE-357), as escorts for a merchant, Leyte-bound convoy.

The convoy reached San Pedro Bay on 10 June, and William C. Cole received repairs to the damage she had suffered during the kamikaze attack off Okinawa on 24 May. Subsequently, sailing for Luzon in company with Vammen (DE-644), Cole fueled upon arrival at Lingayen and soon thereafter headed for Okinawa convoying LST group 104. Arriving there on the 24th, the destroyer escort shifted to Kerama Retto the following day where she rendezvoused with Curtiss (AV-4), two ATA's (124 and 125), and LCI-993 to join Witter (DE-636) and Forrest (DMS-24) in escorting those ships to Saipan, where they arrived on 30 June.

Assigned to a patrol area east of Saipan on 2 July, William C. Cole operated on that station until relieved on the 11th by Fieberling (DE-640). The destroyer escort remained at Saipan until 22 July, when she shifted to Guam. Once there, she performed patrol work out of Apra Harbor for a week before she returned to Saipan in company with Austin (DE-15). Cole ended July escorting the attack transport Logan (APA-196) to the Marshalls.

After shepherding the attack transport safely to Eniwetok, William C. Cole proceeded independently to Saipan, arriving on 8 August. Following training exercises with submarines, antiaircraft firing practices, and a six-day availability, the destroyer escort patrolled off Tinian until relieved on 17 August, two days after Japan capitulated, bringing the long Pacific War to a close.

== Post-war operations ==
For William C. Cole, however, the end of the war did not mean the end to her activities. She escorted PC-1587 to Iwo Jima and later operated off that island on air-sea rescue assignments for the remainder of August. Cole then operated out of Iwo Jima on air-sea rescue assignments for the entire month of September and into October 1945 before she returned to Saipan, her base for similar operations until she departed the western Pacific, bound for the west coast of the United States.

After a yard availability at the Puget Sound Navy Yard, Bremerton, Washington, William C. Cole returned – via Pearl Harbor and Guam – to the Far East in the spring of 1946 and operated out of Shanghai, Okinawa, and Tsingtao into the summer. She then returned – via Guam, Kwajalein, and Pearl Harbor – to San Diego on 28 July. Following still another tour of duty in the Far East under the aegis of Commander, Naval Forces, Far East from 10 March to 31 August 1947 – at Sasebo, Pusan, Yokosuka, Wakayama, and Kagoshima – Cole operated locally out of San Diego until she was decommissioned and placed in reserve on 13 March 1948. She was later inactivated on 28 April of that year.

William C. Cole remained in reserve until struck from the Naval Vessel Register on 1 March 1972. She was then sold to Zidell Explorations, Inc., of Portland, Oregon, on 20 November 1972 and subsequently scrapped.

== Awards ==
William C. Cole (DE-641) received one battle star for her participation in the capture and occupation of Okinawa.
