= William Carey Cole =

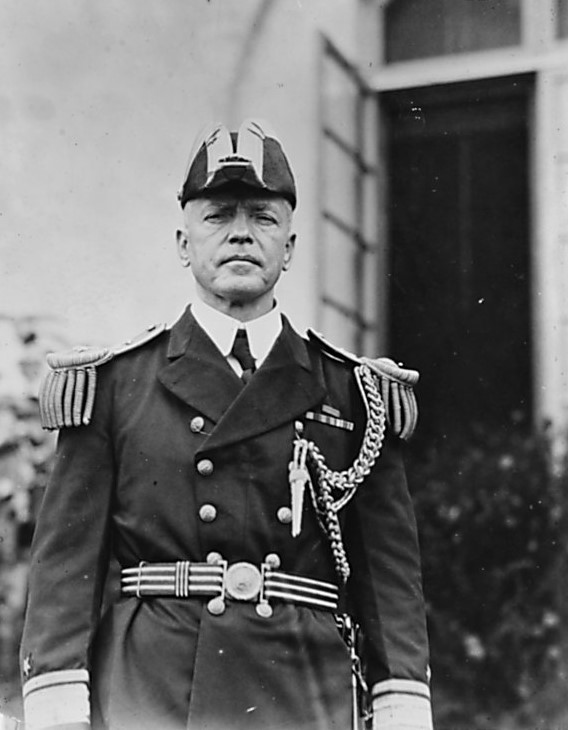
- Born: August 23, 1868; Chicago, Illinois
- Died: May 28, 1935 (aged 66); Vallejo, California
- Military career
- Allegiance: United States of America
- Branch: United States Navy
- Service years: 1889–1932
- Rank: Vice Admiral
- Conflicts: Spanish–American War; World War I
- Awards: Navy Cross

William Carey Cole (23 August 1868 – 28 May 1935) was an admiral of the United States Navy during the early 20th century.

== Biography ==
Cole was born in Chicago, Illinois, on 23 August 1868. He was appointed a naval cadet on 5 September 1885 and graduated from the United States Naval Academy on 7 June 1889. At the end of the two years of service at sea then required by law—in USS Iroquois and USS Charleston—Cole received his commission as an ensign on 1 July 1891.

After further sea service in Nipsic, Cole headed the branch hydrographic office in Cleveland, Ohio, from 23 October 1894 to 10 September 1896 before he went first to the cruiser Raleigh and later to dispatch boat USS Dolphin. After a stint in the hydrographic office in Washington, D.C., and a brief tour at the Washington Navy Yard, Cole reported once more to Dolphin and, while in that ship, took part in the Spanish–American War off Santiago, Cuba.

Subsequently serving at the Washington Navy Yard and commanding, in succession, tugboat Tecumseh and yacht Sylph, Cole went to the Newport News Shipbuilding and Drydock Co. in the summer of 1905 to familiarize himself with the work of a naval inspector of equipment before assuming that office in the General Electric Co., of Schenectady, New York, and later in the New York Shipbuilding Co., Camden, New Jersey.

On 18 April 1907, Cole—by then a lieutenant commander—became the navigator of the new battleship Kansas when she was first commissioned. He subsequently became her executive officer before reporting to the Naval Academy. Promoted to commander on 20 October 1910, Cole subsequently assumed simultaneous command of all of the ships at the Naval Academy, including the steam sloop USS Hartford and the cruiser USS Olympia.

Cole next went to the Asiatic Station and reported for duty at Olongapo, Philippine Islands, on 10 March. There, he assumed command of the monitors Monadnock and Monterey (in first reserve) but was detached from that duty on 4 December. He took command of the gunboat Helena two days after Christmas of 1913 and assumed the concurrent duties of Senior Officer, Yangtze Valley.

Detached in the spring of 1915, Cole attended the long course at the Naval War College, Newport, R.I., and then became Inspector of Engineering Material in the Boston District. On 10 April 1917, shortly after the United States entered World War I, Cole took command of the armored cruiser Frederick (Armored Cruiser No. 8) and remained in that warship until 23 September when he was given command of Nevada (Battleship No. 36). For "exceptionally meritorious service in a duty of great responsibility" commanding Nevada during World War I, Cole received the Navy Cross.

After leaving Nevada on 7 May 1919, Cole served in London as assistant attaché before he went to Washington, D.C., where he became, in time, the Assistant Chief of Naval Operations, remaining in that duty into 1922. Attaining flag rank on 28 January 1922, he was detached from his Assistant CNO duties on 10 March and went to the Panama Canal Zone where he became Commander, Special Service Squadron—a naval force colloquially known as the "Banana Fleet"—on 29 April 1922, hoisting his two-starred flag in the cruiser Birmingham (CL-2).

In the spring of 1923, Cole fleeted up to duty as chief of staff to the Commander in Chief, United States Fleet and remained in that billet for two years before he became Commandant of the Norfolk Navy Yard in the autumn of 1926. Subsequently serving as Commander, Battleship Division 4 from 11 July 1928 to 21 May 1929 and as Commander, Scouting Fleet—with the rank of vice admiral—from 21 June 1929 to 14 June 1930, Cole became Commandant of the 12th Naval District in the summer of 1930. Relieved on 1 June 1932, he briefly served as Inspector of Petroleum Reserves from 28 June to 6 August 1932, before he was retired on 1 September 1932. Cole died at the Naval Hospital, Mare Island Navy Yard, Vallejo, California, on 28 May 1935.

== Namesake ==
In 1943, the destroyer escort USS William C. Cole (DE-641) was named in honor of Adm. Cole, sponsored by his widow, Mrs. William C. Cole.
