= George Ramsey Clark =

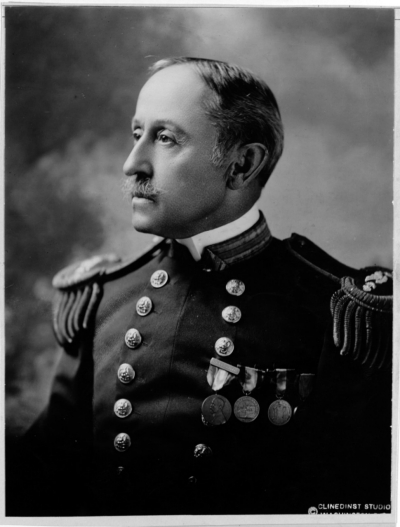
- Rear Admiral George R. Clark, USN, Judge Advocate General of the Navy.
- Born: 20 March 1857; Monroe, Ohio, US
- Died: 14 December 1945 (aged 88); Washington, D.C., US
- Burial place: Arlington National Cemetery
- Military career
- Allegiance: United States
- Branch: United States Navy
- Service years: 1878–1921
- Rank: Rear Admiral
- Commands: Texas; Iowa; Minnesota; Commandant of the Great Lakes Naval Training Station, Illinois; Superintendent of the Ninth, Tenth, and Eleventh Naval Districts; Commandant Naval Station, Hawaii; Judge Advocate General of the Navy
- Conflicts: Spanish–American War; Philippine–American War; Boxer Rebellion; World War I
- Awards: Distinguished Service Medal; Spanish Campaign Medal; Philippine Campaign Medal; Victory Medal with Base Clasp

George R. Clark (20 March 1857 – 14 December 1945) was a rear admiral in the United States Navy. George R. Clark served in various capacities as an instructor, navigator, line officer, station commandant, and retired as Judge Advocate General of the Navy in the late 19th and early 20th centuries.

== Early life and career ==
Rear Admiral Clark was born in Monroe, Ohio, 20 March 1857, he was appointed to the Naval Academy from his native state in 1874, he graduated on 20 June 1878, promoted to Midshipman in June 1880, to Ensign (junior grade) in March 1883, and was commissioned Ensign, 24 August 1883.

== Naval service ==
After graduation in 1878, he served successively until the fall of 1889, in the following ships of the US Navy: Independence, Tuscarora, Wachusett, Michigan, Trenton, Alliance, and Lancaster. He then had brief duty at William Cramp and Sons Shipyard, Philadelphia, Pennsylvania, and rejoined Michigan in April 1890. Thereafter, until 1895, he continued sea duty in Richmond, Atlanta, Machias, Essex, and Amphitrite.

A tour of duty as an instructor in English at the Naval Academy, preceded further duty afloat from March 1898, in the Puritan, Adams, and in the gunboat Yorktown, which operated in the Philippines and in China during the Boxer Rebellion. In June 1900, he was transferred to Monocacy, and in July, was hospitalized in Yokohama, Japan, and the following 2 November, was returned to the United States.

He had compass instruction in the Bureau of Equipment and Recruiting, Washington, D. C., from February to March 1901, and in April 1901, became Officer in Charge of the Branch Hydrographic Office, Cleveland, Ohio, serving in that assignment until May 1902. The two succeeding years he served as Navigator of Monongahela, and was Executive Officer of Prairie from May 1904, until she was placed out of commission in July 1905. For a year thereafter he served as Aide to the Commandant of the Norfolk Navy Yard, Portsmouth, Virginia.

He commanded the battleship Texas from September 1906 until August 1907, when he returned to the Naval Academy to serve as Head of the Department of English. During the latter period of his three years there, he was also Commander of the Naval Academy Practice Squadron on board USS Iowa (BB-4), and for several months commanded that battleship. In April 1911, he was transferred to commander of Minnesota, and when detached from that command late in 1912, he became Commandant of the Great Lakes Naval Training Station, Illinois, and Superintendent of the Ninth, Tenth, and Eleventh Naval Districts.

In August 1914, he reported to the Secretary of the Navy, Josephus Daniels, for duty as Aide for Education. Detached from that assignment in June 1915, he next served for a year as Senior member, Naval Examining and Naval Retirement Board, with additional duty as a Member of the Marine Examining Board. In August 1916, he was designated Commandant, Naval Station, Hawaii, and in March 1917, was assigned additional duty as a member of the Joint Board in Connection with the Defense of the Island of Oahu, Territory of Hawaii.

In May 1918, during World War I, Rear Admiral Clark returned to the United States for duty as Judge Advocate General of the Navy. He was transferred to the Retired List of the Navy in February 1921, but continued active duty as Judge Advocate General until 30 April, of that year, when he was released from all active duty. For outstanding services during and following World War I, he was awarded the Distinguished Service Medal.

Rear Admiral Clark, in collaboration with others, wrote a Short History of the United States Navy, which was published in 1911, and subsequently used as a text book at the Naval Academy. He also was the author of several articles published in the Naval Institute Proceedings.

He died in Washington, D. C., on 14 December 1945.

== Awards ==
In addition to the Distinguished Service Medal, Rear Admiral Clark had the Spanish Campaign Medal; the Philippine Campaign Medal; and the Victory Medal with Base Clasp.

== Bibliography ==
Online resources

- "George Ramsey Clark: 20 March 1857 – 14 December 1945". Naval History and Heritage Command. 21 September 2016. This article incorporates text from this source, which is in the public domain.

Military offices
Preceded by William Carleton Watts	Judge Advocate General of the Navy; 1918–1921	Succeeded by Julian Lane Latimer
