= Julian Lane Latimer =

American Admiral

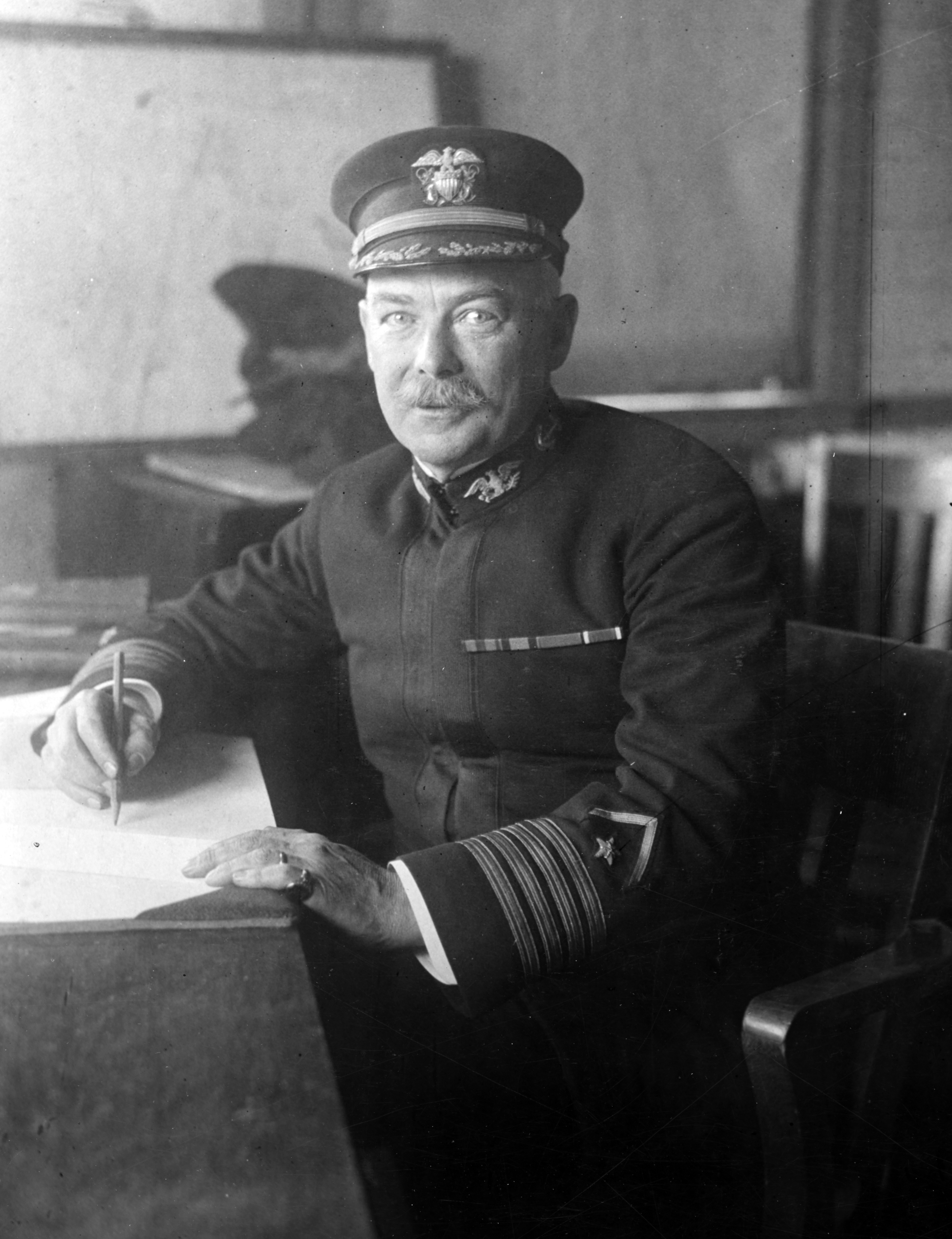
- Rear Admiral Julian Lane Latimer, USN, Judge Advocate General of the Navy.
- Born: 10 October 1868; Shepherdstown, West Virginia, US
- Died: 4 June 1939 (aged 70); New York City, US
- Burial place: Elmwood Cemetery (West Virginia)
- Alma mater: United States Naval Academy
- Spouse: Laura Singer Latimer (nee. Richardson)
- Children: Julian Lane Latimer II
- Military career
- Allegiance: United States of America
- Branch: United States Navy
- Service years: 1890 - 1930
- Rank: Rear Admiral
- Commands: USS Rhode Island (BB-17); Commandant of the Pelham Bay Naval Training Station, New York; Judge Advocate General of the Navy 1921 - 1925; Commander, Special Service Squadron (7 May 1926 – 8 July 1927); 4th Naval District 5 November 1927 - 30 June 1930
- Conflicts: Spanish-American War; World War I; Nicaraguan Civil War (1926–27)
- Awards: Navy Cross; Distinguished Service Medal

Julian Lane Latimer (1868–1939) was a rear admiral in the United States Navy. He served in World War I as a station commandant, and after World War I, as Judge Advocate General of the Navy.

== Naval career ==
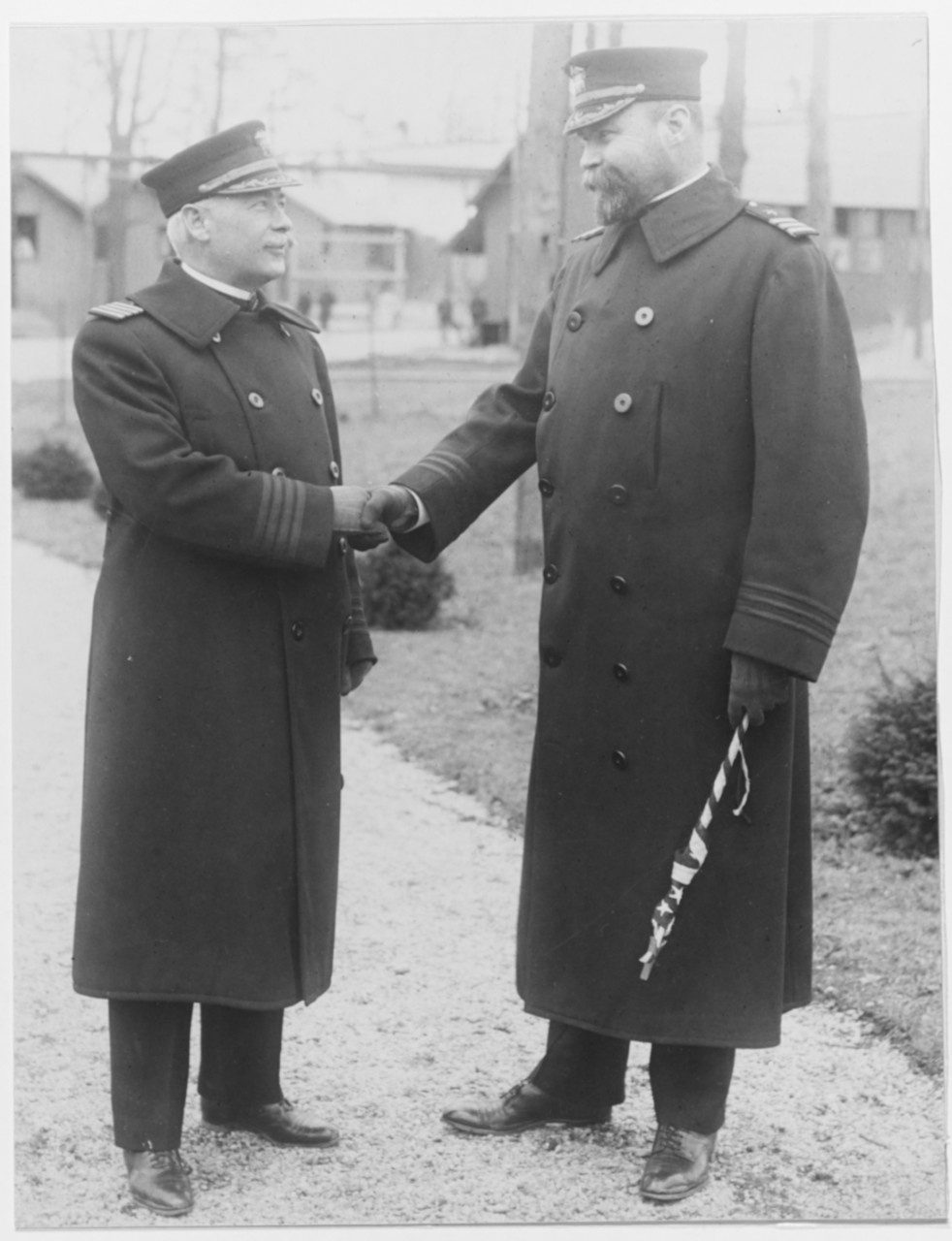
Pelham Bay Naval Training Station New York turned over from Commander William B. Franklin to Captain Julian L. Latimer

Julian Lane Latimer was born in 1868 in Shepherdstown, West Virginia. He graduated from the United States Naval Academy in 1890.

He was stationed on board the USS Winslow (TB-5) during the Spanish-American War.

During the Great War, Latimer served as captain of the USS Rhode Island (BB-17) from 1916 to 1919. He earned a Navy Cross for his service on the Rhode Island. On 25 February 1919, he took over the position of Commandant of the Pelham Bay Naval Training Station from Commander William B. Franklin.

Latimer became the Judge Advocate General of the Navy in the spring of 1921 and remained so until 1925.

On 7 May 1926, Latimer became the Commander of the Special Service Squadron. On 23 December 1926, the squadron was sent to Nicaragua to deal with the Nicaraguan Civil War (1926–27). He earned the Distinguished Service Medal for his command of the squadron.

He succeeded Rear Admiral Thomas P. Magruder as the commandant of the 4th Naval District from 5 November 1927, until 30 June 1930.

Military offices
Preceded by George Ramsey Clark	Judge Advocate General of the Navy; 1921–1925	Succeeded by Edward Hale Campbell
