= Thomas P. Magruder =

United States Navy Rear admiral

Thomas Pickett Magruder
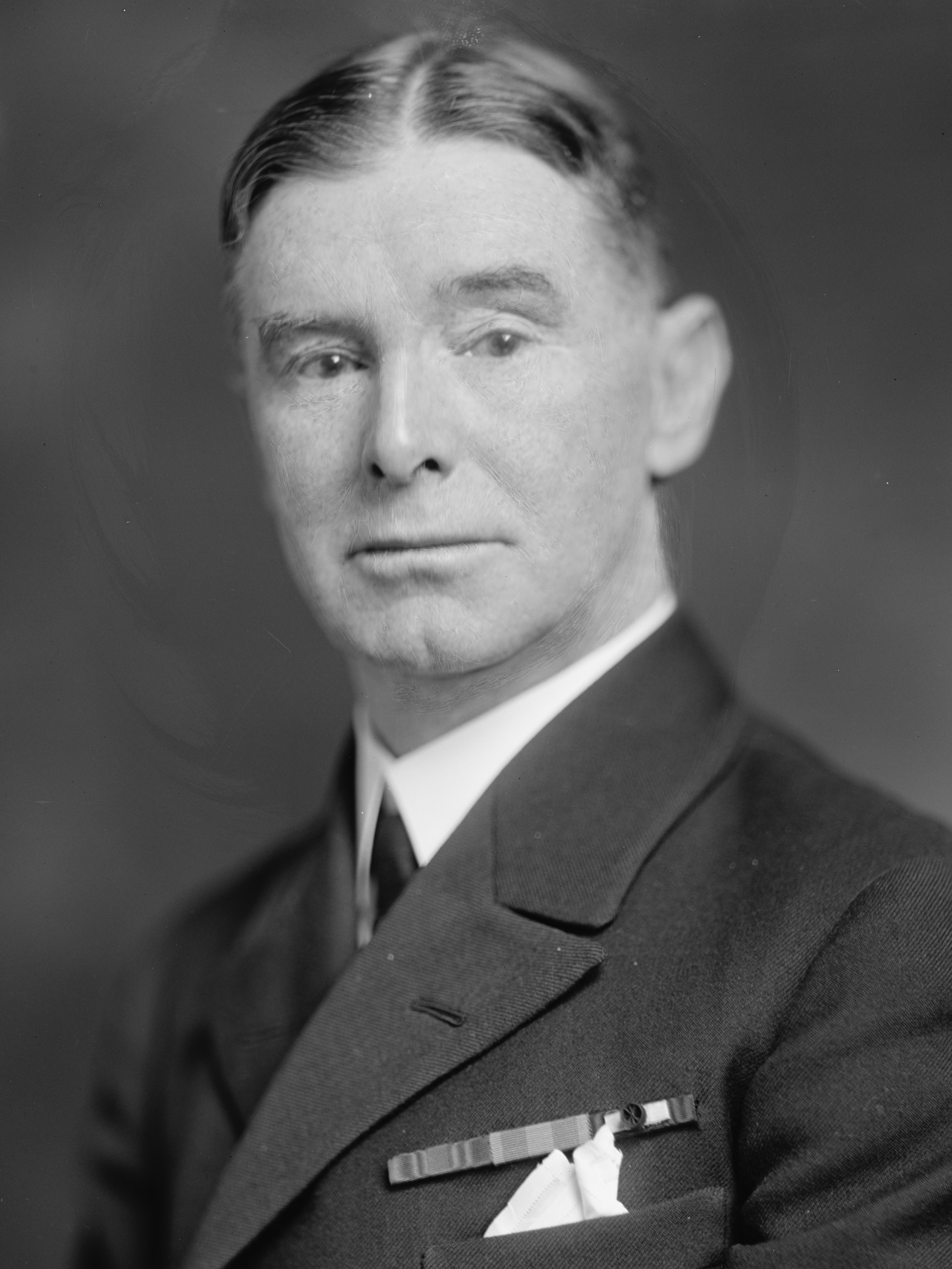
- Born: November 29, 1867; Yazoo County, Mississippi
- Died: May 26, 1938 (aged 70); Jamestown, Rhode Island
- Burial place: Arlington National Cemetery
- Military career
- Allegiance: United States of America
- Branch: United States Navy
- Service years: 1898–1931
- Rank: Rear admiral
- Commands: Fleet Base Force; Fourth Naval District; Eighth Naval District; USS Nevada
- Conflicts: Spanish–American War; Veracruz Expedition; World War I
- Awards: Navy Distinguished Service Medal

Rear Admiral Thomas Pickett Magruder (29 November 1867 - 26 May 1938) was a decorated flag officer of the United States Navy who became controversial for his 1927 critique of Navy operational practices.

== Background ==
Thomas Pickett Magruder was born in Yazoo County, Mississippi, 29 November 1867. His father, Lawson Williams Magruder, was a Major in the Confederate army and served throughout the American Civil War.

Magruder had six brothers, several of whom had military careers of their own. His younger brother Cary retired as Commodore following World War II.

Magruder entered the United States Naval Academy on 3 September 1885, graduating in June with the Class of 1889, and was commissioned ensign on 1 July 1891. He later graduated from the Naval War College, Newport, Rhode Island, in 1916.

He was promoted to lieutenant (junior grade) on 9 October 1898, to lieutenant on 3 March 1899, to lieutenant commander on 1 July 1905, to commander on 1 July 1910, and to captain 6 August 1915. He was promoted to rear admiral (temporary grade) on 25 April 1920, and to rear admiral (permanent grade) on 5 June 1921.

== Service ==
Following graduation from the Naval Academy, he was assigned to the protected cruiser USS Charleston, and while with that ship was commended for courage and presented a gold watch on 11 May 1890 for saving the life of a woman from drowning. From 1891 to 1893, he served aboard the schoolship USS Monongahela, built as a barkentine–rigged screw sloop-of-war, at the Naval Training Station, Newport, Rhode Island, then on USS Kearsarge in 1894, and was aboard when she was wrecked on a reef off of Roncador Cay in the Caribbean Sea on 2 February of that year. Though the vessel was unsalvageable, the crew made it safely ashore. Magruder took the first boat with a hawser to the reef, "and for his manner of doing so was commended by Rear Admiral Stanton". Magruder then served aboard USS Miantonomoh, an Amphitrite-class monitor, later in 1894, and was then ordered to shore duty in the Navy Department.

In 1896, he returned to sea duty, first aboard the gunboat USS Fern, then on gunboat USS Nashville, in 1897–1898. Magruder was cited for gallantry in the Spanish–American War. "By Act of Congress he was advanced five numbers in grade for 'Eminent and conspicuous conduct in battle' for cutting cables under fire at Cienfuegos, Cuba." This action occurred 11 May 1898.

From 1899 to 1901 he served at the U.S. Naval Academy as instructor in seamanship and navigation. From 1901 to 1903 he was on the auxiliary cruiser USS Buffalo, and on USS Texas as Flag Lieutenant for Rear Admiral James H. Sands, 1903–1905.

He was again ordered for duty at the Naval Academy from 1906 to 1907, then to sea duty on USS Iowa. In 1908 he served on USS Alabama as Executive Officer on the Cruise Around the World; in 1909 he served as Commanding Officer of this expedition.

In 1910–1911, Magruder was Inspector of Machinery at Cramp's Ship Yards. He then took the course at the Naval War College from June to October 1911. In 1912–1913 he was in command of the U.S. Naval Station Cavite in the Philippines. In 1913, he was in command of USS Albany, and in command of USS Raleigh on the west coast of Mexico, 1914–1915. In 1915–1916 he was at the Naval War College for long course and in 1916 was in charge of the Division of Naval Military Affairs, Navy Department.

In August 1917, he was ordered to command Squadron 4, Patrol Force and took six sub-chasers, 12 mine sweepers, a tender and the USS Wakiva (his flagship) to the west coast of France. For the successful accomplishment of this duty he received a cable "Well done" from the Chief of Naval Operations.

From 1917 to 1919, on the French coast his "District" included Bay of Quiberon, Loire River, Nantes, and St. Nazaire. On 26 January 1918, his flagship USS Guinevere ran aground and was wrecked off the French coast with no loss of life.

In 1919, Magruder commanded USS Nevada. In 1920–1921 he was Naval Attaché at Paris to settle private claims against the United States and also on other special duty there. In 1921–1923 he was Commandant of the Eighth Naval District and Naval Station New Orleans, Louisiana.

In 1924–26, he commanded the new Light Cruiser Division for two and a half years. Magruder commanded the naval guard for the United States Army world flight in 1924, from Scotland to Boston, via Iceland, Greenland, Labrador, Newfoundland and Nova Scotia. He searched for, found, and rescued the Italian aviator, Antonio Locatelli and three companions in the Arctic Ocean off the shore of Greenland in August 1924, for which a grateful Italian government awarded him the Order of Commander of the Order of Saint Maurice and St. Lazarus.

In 1925 he took his division of light cruisers as a part of the U.S. Fleet on their visit to Australia.

In June 1926, he was ordered to command the Fourth Naval District and the Navy Yard at Philadelphia, Pennsylvania.

== Controversy ==
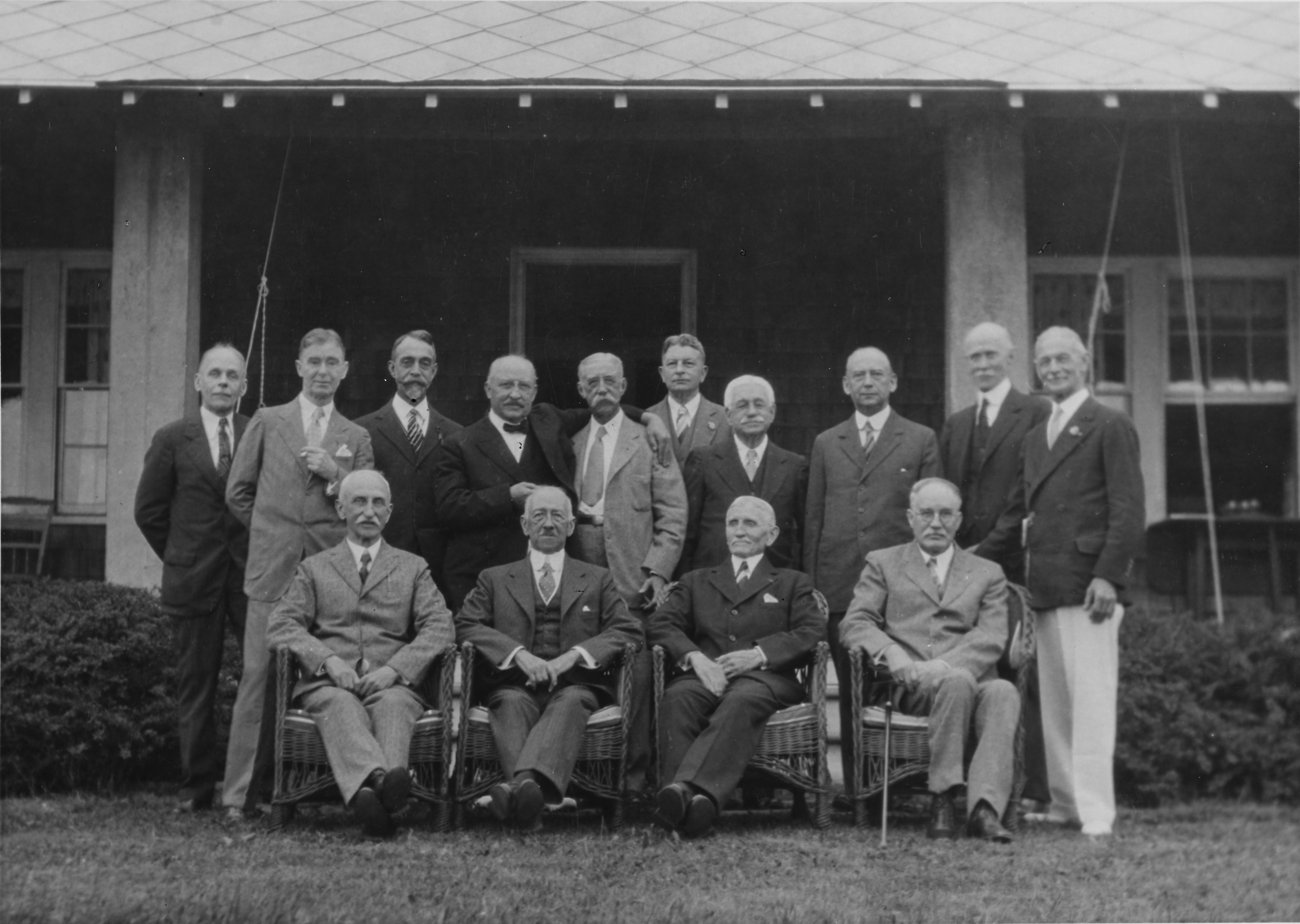
Magruder (Standing, second from left) on the reunion with retired admirals in August 1928.

On 24 September 1927, the Saturday Evening Post published an article by Admiral Magruder entitled "The Navy and Economy". In it "he contended that the Navy was top-heavy with officers, hamstrung by red tape and burdened with idle ships and shipyards, and as a result was wasting 35 [cents] out of every dollar it spent." This led to Magruder being detached from his duty in Philadelphia on 25 October 1927 and placed on "waiting orders" until 1 August 1929. He received a telegram from Secretary of the Navy Curtis D. Wilbur which read:

"Upon the reporting of your relief on or about Nov. 5 you are detached from duty as commandant of the Fourth naval district and from such other duty as may have been assigned to you and you will proceed to Washington and report to the secretary of the navy."

Magruder stated that the order came as a "distinct shock" to him. Although he had been aware that his magazine article had not met with the approval of some naval officials, he stated that he hoped the matter would be straightened out. The admiral said that he would insist on a thorough investigation of the whole affair.

" 'I have been here for 15 months,' said Admiral Magruder, 'and have become very much attached to Philadelphia and Philadelphians. I had hoped to stay here for the full tour of duty. I don't know why I have been detached and shall insist on a thorough investigation.'

"Admiral Magruder reiterated that he had tried for years to effect economies in the navy department and cited his testimony before a special commission in Washington several years ago.

" 'I never have suggested that the navy be reorganized,' Admiral Magruder said. 'I merely set forth what I believed to be needed reforms in the service and nothing has occurred to shake my belief in the justice of my course.' "

On 26 October, Secretary Wilbur stated that the recall of Admiral Magruder was related to "his recent utterances" and correspondence relative to his published criticism of the navy, but said that he would accord "serious consideration" to any request from the admiral for an investigation of the episode.

Magruder exercised his right of appeal, and requested President Calvin Coolidge to revoke the order, through a letter addressed to the President via the Secretary of the Navy, "by whom it is to be forwarded to the White House with the secretary's recommendations."

"It was believed, however, that the President would hesitate to take the matter out of the naval secretary's hands."

=== Other responses ===
Secretary Wilbur stated that the order to Magruder was not 'punitive', but 'administrative'. Rear Admiral Richard H. Leigh, chief of the Bureau of Navigation, made public correspondence between the department and Magruder following his critical magazine article. Leigh said Admiral Magruder had either evaded or answered unsatisfactorily the 13 questions put to him by the department in its request for information to support Magruder's article. Rear Admiral Julian Lane Latimer, president of the Naval Examining Board and former Judge Advocate General of the Navy, will succeed Magruder at Philadelphia, although plans had been made to give him command of the Brooklyn Navy Yard.

The released correspondence revealed that Magruder had at least partially tempered his statements. Under the date of 19 October, Secretary Wilbur asked Admiral Magruder to verify that he had stated that the navy is spending $3 million a year and getting $2 million worth of navy. He was also asked to confirm whether he had said in a speech that if the navy asked him for his own reorganization plans, "I'll give them something to think about."

"Replying, Magruder said the latter quotation was correct, but as to the former he was not certain of the figures. He added, however, that his intention was to convey that the navy 'is spending a great deal more money than is necessary for the operation and upkeep of the present navy.' "

=== Coolidge declines to interfere ===
On 27 October, Secretary Wilbur announced at his daily press conference that after a conference with the Chief Executive at the White House, President Coolidge denied Admiral Magruder's request for a personal interview and revocation of the recall order. Wilbur's visit to the Executive Mansion was for the express purpose of delivering Magruder's letter seeking the interview.

The Secretary stated that he believed this was the first time that an officer of Magruder's rank had gone over the head of the Navy Secretary in an appeal to the President.

=== Outcome ===
Magruder spent two years "waiting orders". He was returned to duty in 1929, and served as Commander, Fleet Base Force before retiring in 1931.

During the admiral's period of inactivity, he penned a volume, The United States Navy, giving a "snapshot" of the naval service as it was between the two world wars.

== Personal life ==
Magruder married Rosa Eliza Boush, daughter of Naval Constructor George Richard Boush and his wife, Adele Bilisoly Boush, in Washington, D. C., on 29 May 1893. He died 26 May 1938 at Jamestown, Rhode Island, after a long illness. He was buried with full military honors in Arlington National Cemetery. He was survived by one daughter, Adele Bousch Magruder, who became the wife of Stuart O. Grieg, Commander, U.S. Navy.

In religion he was Presbyterian, in politics a Jeffersonian Democrat.

== Honors and awards ==
Besides the honors mentioned, i.e. the gold watch and chain, the Commenda Mauriziana (Italy), he was also awarded the Navy Distinguished Service Medal, Commander of Legion of Honour (France) and he also had the Spanish War Medal, Cuban Campaign Medal, Mexican Campaign Medal, and Victory Medal of the World War.

After the Spanish–American War he was presented with a gold mounted sword by his fellow citizens of Vicksburg, Mississippi. He was a member of the United States Naval Institute, the American Society of Naval Engineers, and the Army and Navy Club of Washington, D. C.
