= USS Idalis =

Patrol vessel of the United States Navy

History

United States
- Name: USS Idalis
- Namesake: Previous name retained
- Builder: Gas Engine and Power Company, Morris Heights, The Bronx, New York
- Completed: 1908
- Acquired: June 1917
- Commissioned: 25 August 1917
- Fate: Returned to owner 22 March 1919
- Notes: Operated as civilian yacht Idalis and Amalia IV 1908-1917 and from 1919

General characteristics
- Type: Patrol vessel and training ship
- Tonnage: 40 tons
- Length: 67 ft 8 in (20.62 m)
- Beam: 14 ft 2 in (4.32 m)
- Draft: 3 ft (0.91 m)
- Speed: 10 knots
- Armament: 1 × 1-pounder gun

USS Idalis (SP-270) was a United States Navy patrol vessel in commission from 1917 to 1919.

Idalis was built as a civilian motor yacht in 1908 by the Gas Engine and Power Company in Morris Heights, The Bronx, New York. Sources differ as to her original name; she either was built as Idalis and later was renamed Amalia IV, or was built as Amalia IV and later renamed Idalis. The U.S. Navy purchased her from her owner, Carl Reinschild of New York City, in June 1917 for World War I service. She was commissioned on 25 August 1917 as USS Idalis (SP-270) -- that name representing the Navy either retaining her existing name or reverting her from Amalia IV to her previous name

Assigned to the 3rd Naval District, Idalis served as a patrol craft in Long Island Sound and as training ship for officers at the Naval Reserve Training School Pelham Bay Park at Pelham Bay Park, New York, until the close of World War I.

Idalis was returned to Reinschild on 22 March 1919.
