= List of U.S. security clearance terms =

This list covers security clearance terms used in the United States of America.

Within the U.S. government, security clearance levels serve as a mechanism to ascertain which individuals are authorized to access sensitive or classified information. These levels often appear in employment postings for Defense related jobs and other jobs involving substantial amounts of responsibility, such as air traffic control or nuclear energy positions.

The different organizations in the United States Federal Government use different terminology and lettering. Security clearances can be issued by many United States of America government agencies.

The checks for clearances and the granting of clearances is carried out by the US Office of Personnel Management.

== Use ==
Security clearance levels often appear in employment postings for Defense related jobs, and other jobs involving substantial amounts of responsibility, such as air traffic control or nuclear energy positions. Employers generally prefer to hire people who are already cleared to access classified information at the level needed for a given job or contract, because security clearances can take up to a year to obtain. In general, most employers look for candidates who hold an active Department of Defense (DoD) collateral clearance or a blanket TS/SCI-cleared (Top Secret / Sensitive Compartmented Information) and who have a counterintelligence (CI), full-scope polygraph (FSP), also known as expanded scope screening (ESS).

== Security levels ==
Security clearances can be issued by many United States of America government agencies, including but not limited to the Department of Defense (DoD), the Department of State (DOS), the Department of Homeland Security (DHS), the Department of Energy (DoE), the Department of Justice (DoJ), the National Security Agency (NSA), and the Central Intelligence Agency (CIA). DoD issues more than 80% of all clearances. There are three levels of DoD security clearances:

1. TOP SECRET – Information of which the unauthorized disclosure could reasonably be expected to cause exceptionally grave damage to the national security.
2. SECRET – Information of which the unauthorized disclosure could reasonably be expected to cause serious damage to the national security.
3. CONFIDENTIAL – Information of which the unauthorized disclosure could reasonably be expected to cause damage to the national security.

Additionally, the United States Department of Energy issues two levels of security clearances:

1. Q Clearance – Allows access to Classified information up to and including TOP SECRET data with the special designation: Restricted Data (TS//RD) and special Q-Cleared "security" areas.
2. L Clearance – Allows access to Classified information up to and including SECRET data with the special designation: Formerly Restricted Data (S//FRD) and special L-Cleared "limited" areas.

=== Additional Security descriptions and designations ===
==== Public trust position ====
Despite the common misconception, a public trust position is not a security clearance, and is not the same as the confidential designation. Certain positions which require access to sensitive information, but not information which is classified, must obtain this designation through a background check. Public Trust Positions can either be moderate-risk or high-risk.

==== Classification subsets: Sensitive Compartmented Information and Special Access Programs ====
Information "above Top Secret," a phrase used by the media, means either Sensitive Compartmented Information (SCI) or Special Access Program (SAP). It is not truly "above" Top Secret, since there is no clearance higher than Top Secret. SCI information may be either Secret or Top Secret, but in either case it has additional controls on dissemination beyond those associated with the classification level alone. In order to gain SCI Access, one would need to have a Single Scope Background Investigation (SSBI). Compartments of information are identified by code words. This is one means by which the "need to know" principle is formally and automatically enforced.

In order to have access to material in a particular SCI "compartment", the person must first have the clearance level for the material. The SCI designation is an add-on, not a special clearance level. Someone cleared at the SECRET level for some compartment X cannot see material in compartment X that is classified TOP SECRET. But the opposite is true: a person cleared for TOP SECRET with access to X material can also access SECRET material in compartment X. Compartments have designators which uniquely identify that compartment. These designators may also be classified, even protected under another SCI compartment.

As long as the holder of a clearance is sponsored, the clearance remains active. If the holder loses sponsorship, the holder is eligible for re-employment with the same clearance for up to 24 months without reinvestigation, after which an update investigation is required.

A Periodic Reinvestigation is typically required every five years for Top Secret and ten years for Secret, depending upon the agency. Access to a compartment of information lasts only as long as the person's need to have access to a given category of information.

===== Additional Designations =====
Unclassified (U) is a valid security description, especially when indicating unclassified information within a document classified at a higher level. For example, the title of a Secret report is often unclassified, and must be marked as such.

For access to information at a given classification level, individuals must have been granted access by the sponsoring government organization at that or a higher classification level, and have a need to know the information. The government also supports access to SCI and SAPs in which access is determined by need-to-know. These accesses require increased investigative requirements before access is granted.

== Investigations ==
The following investigations are used in clearance determinations:

- ANACI (Access National Agency Check with Inquiries) – Initial Confidential, Secret, L, LX; only used for civilian employees
- NACLC (National Agency Check with Law and Credit) – Initial Confidential, Secret, L, LX; reinvestigations
- MBI – (Moderate Risk Background Investigation) – NACLC plus a Personal Subject Interview (PRSI) and written inquiries to employers, schools, and references for past 5 years.
- SSBI (Single Scope Background Investigation) – Initial Top Secret, SCI, Q, QX
- SSBI-PR – SSBI Periodic Reinvestigation
- PPR – Phased Periodic Reinvestigation
- PRS – Periodic Reinvestigation-Secret
- T3 or T3R - Tier 3 or Tier 3 Reinvestigation, now replace all NACLC.
- T5 and T5R - Tier 5 or Tier 5 Reinvestigation, now replace SSBI and SBPR respectively.
- Yankee White – An investigation required for personnel working with the President and Vice President of the United States. Obtaining such clearance requires, in part, an SSBI.

Many other investigative products have been used to grant clearances in the past. While some of them are still used to determine suitability for employment or enlistment, only the above are used to grant clearances.

== Additional investigation or adjudication ==
Certain accesses require persons to undertake one or more polygraph tests:

- Counterintelligence Scope (CI, CI Poly)
- Full Scope / Lifestyle (FSP, FS, LS, Lifestyle Poly)

== SCI eligibility ==
Sensitive compartmented information (SCI) is a type of classified information controlled through formal systems established by the Director of National Intelligence. To access SCI, one must first have a favorable SSBI and be granted SCI eligibility. Because the SSBI is also used to grant collateral top secret eligibility, the two are often granted together and referred to as TS/SCI. Access to individual SCI control systems, compartments, and subcompartments may then be granted by the owner of that information. Note that additional investigation or adjudication may be required.

In general, military personnel and civilian employees (government and contractor) do not publish the individual compartments for which they are cleared. While this information is not classified, specific compartment listings may reveal sensitive information when correlated with an individual's résumé. Therefore, it is sufficient to declare that a candidate possesses a TS/SCI clearance with a polygraph.
