= Born secret =

Information classified since created; generally referring to nuclear weapons

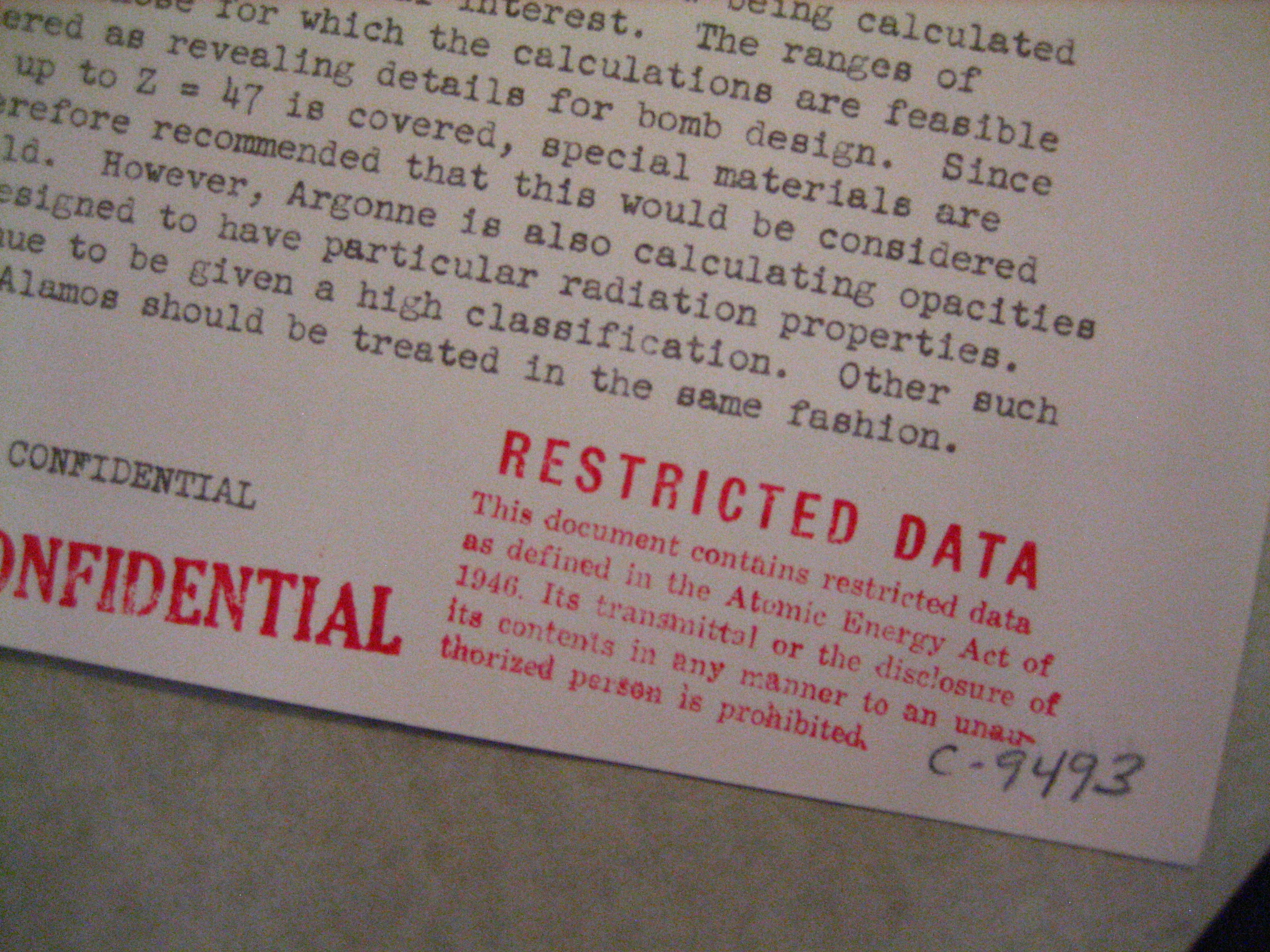
A 1946 "Restricted Data" stamp on an Atomic Energy Commission document.

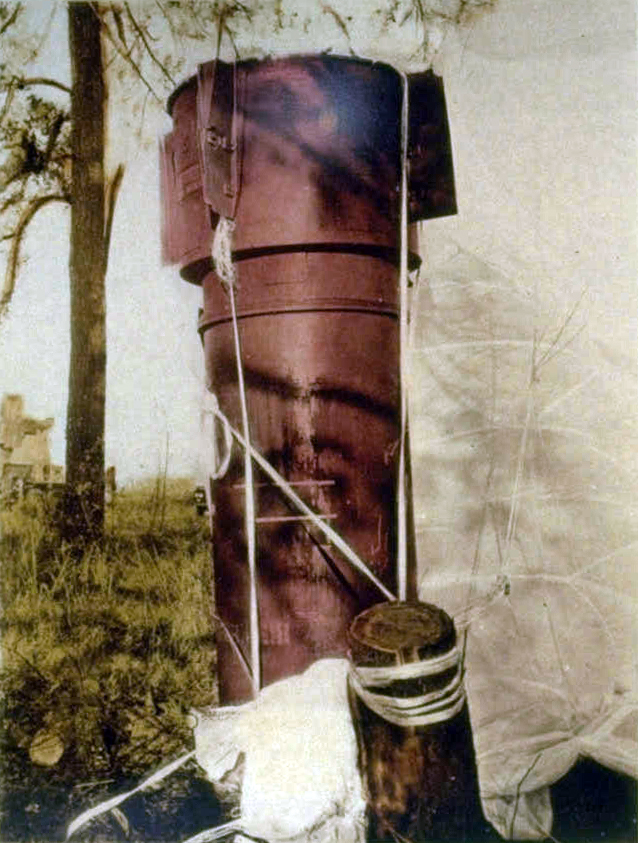
One of the Mk 39 nuclear weapons at Goldsboro, largely intact, with its parachute still attached.

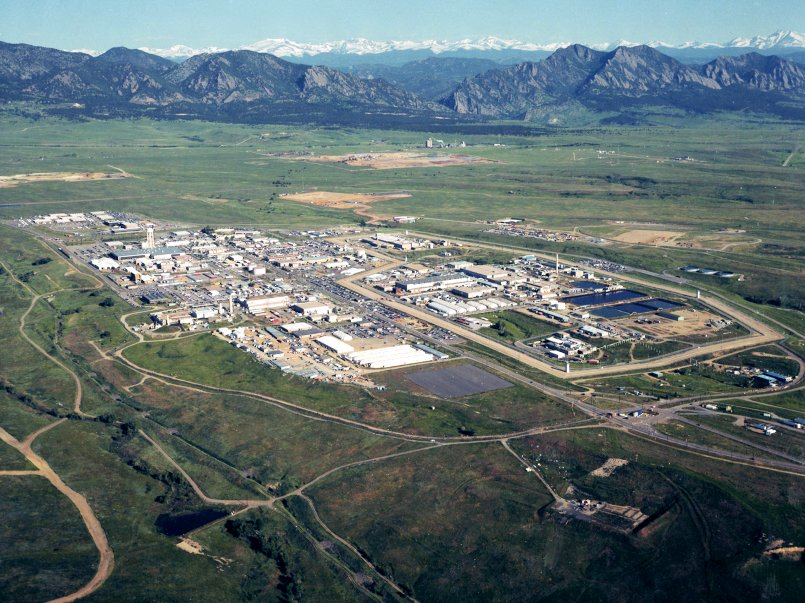
The Rocky Flats Plant, which released plutonium into the environment.

Born secret (also known as born classified) is a legal doctrine in the United States where certain information is automatically classified from the moment it is created, regardless of author or location. Scholars describe the doctrine as unique in U.S. law because it can criminalize the discussion of information that is already publicly available. The rule originated in laws of the United States covering the design, production, and use of nuclear weapons, although it has also been used to classify other nuclear technologies and cryptography data. The United States Department of Energy has called the born secret doctrine controversial.

The doctrine is associated with the Restricted Data category created by the Atomic Energy Act of 1946 and retained in the Atomic Energy Act of 1954, which treated nuclear weapons and related nuclear energy information as legally protected by default until affirmatively removed from that category. Legal and policy debate has focused on its relationship to the First Amendment to the United States Constitution, particularly because attempts to apply it can resemble prior restraint.

A challenge arose in United States v. The Progressive, a 1979 dispute over an article assembled from unclassified sources about the hydrogen bomb; the case ended without a definitive ruling when it was dismissed as moot. Experts have argued that secrecy rules associated with the doctrine complicate reporting on nuclear safety, accidents, contamination, and public health impacts.

== History ==
The born-secret concept applied to any data related to nuclear technologies, whether the specific technology was developed by the United States government or by other parties. Howard Morland, writing in Cardozo Law Review, compared the doctrine to a permanent gag order on nuclear ideas and concepts. The idea is rooted in the Atomic Energy Act of 1946, which declared that all information about nuclear weapons and nuclear energy was 'Restricted Data' until officially declassified. In the 1954 revision, the United States Atomic Energy Commission (AEC) gained authority to declassify entire categories of information. The policy assumed that nuclear information could be so vital to national security that it required classification even before formal evaluation. The 1954 act defined Restricted Data as:

All data concerning (1) design, manufacture, or utilization of atomic weapons; (2) the production of special nuclear material; or (3) the use of special nuclear material in the production of energy, but shall not include data declassified or removed from the Restricted Data category pursuant to section 2162 of this title.

United States government scientists working on nuclear weapons design have held Q clearance, to access Restricted Data. In 2006, the United States Department of Energy (DOE) itself called the born-secret doctrine was responsible for a "great deal of controversy". Writing for the Department, Nick Prospero cited concerns about constitutionality and the stifling of scientific progress. Prospero also noted long-standing public pressure for open access to health, safety, and environmental data—issues stretching back to the DOE's predecessors, the AEC and the Energy Research and Development Administration.

== Legality and challenges ==
The constitutionality of categorically classifying information at the moment of its creation remains untested in U.S. courts. Commentators have questioned whether categorically restricting dissemination of information at the moment it is created is compatible with the First Amendment to the United States Constitution, particularly where enforcement takes the form of prior restraint. The born‑secret doctrine is reported as the only area of United States law in which discussion of information already in the public sphere is illegal.

=== United States v. The Progressive ===
The legality of the "born secret" doctrine was directly challenged in a 1979 freedom of the press case, United States v. The Progressive. In that case, the magazine The Progressive attempted to publish an account of the so-called "secret of the hydrogen bomb"—the Teller–Ulam design—created entirely from unclassified sources. Many analysts predicted that the United States Supreme Court would, if it heard the case, strike down the born‑secret clause as an unconstitutional restraint on speech. However, the government dropped the case as moot before it was resolved.

Under the laws of the United States, prior restraint is the state censorship of speech by the government before the sharing of information occurs, and is defined in law and allowed in narrow scenarios. Writing in the Cardozo Law Review, Aviam Soifer argues that classification can even apply retroactively to the original conception—or "germination"—of an idea. In Security Classification of Information, Volume 1, Arvin Quist described the statutory "Restricted Data" regime as unique to nuclear information, but noted that the National Security Agency (NSA) later pursued analogous controls over cryptography through voluntary prepublication review rather than legislation.

=== Voluntary compliance and NSA ===
Corrigan and Gibbs in Stanford Magazine describe the NSA response as moving toward measures such as voluntary commercial and academic compliance, including a voluntary compliance system for cryptography research papers that was intended as a compromise approach. The cryptography dispute began in 1977, when a letter from J. A. Meyer warned the Institute of Electrical and Electronics Engineers that publishing work on encryption could violate federal regulations and expose authors and publishers to prosecution, including under export-control theories and laws such as the U.S.'s International Traffic in Arms Regulations. Meyer was identified by journalists as an NSA employee and the letter helped trigger wider academic and press attention around whether publication could be treated as a national security offense.

The stakeholders in the non-legislative approach included academic researchers, commercial researchers, and scientific publishers, because the compromise mechanism depended on voluntary behavior by authors and journals rather than a statutory restriction. Corrigan and Gibbs connected the shift to NSA director Vice Admiral Bobby Ray Inman, who convened an internal panel that considered seeking new legislation, then moved toward voluntary prepublication review after legislative options were described as politically unviable.

=== Publication options and risks ===
Martin Hellman argued that even if publication were blocked in journals, researchers could still disclose work through public talks via the First Amendment. Steven Aftergood of the Federation of American Scientists described voluntary review as the best compromise that participants had found, and notes that similar voluntary systems were later attempted by other scientific journals. The prepublication review process was used for about a decade before it "fell apart" amid growing civilian and commercial uses for cryptography and the rapid expansion of the field.

As suppressing publication proved difficult to sustain in public, the NSA emphasized other points of influence over nongovernmental cryptography, including research funding and national standards. Corrigan and Gibbs described NSA involvement in reviewing research grant applications and a parallel effort to shape which cryptosystems entered national standards via the National Bureau of Standards (later the National Institute of Standards and Technology), including later-declassified accounts of NSA pressure and disputes over the Data Encryption Standard (DES) cryptography algorithm key lengths, which determined the potential strength of DES's encryption.

Quist cited Federal Register notices in 1967 and 1972—that a loophole exists for certain topics of classification:

According to current DOE procedures, research and development on methods of isotope separation other than gaseous diffusion or gas centrifuge can be carried out on an unclassified basis until that research and development shows a "reasonable potential for the separation of practical quantities of special nuclear material." Thus, this area of atomic energy information is not "born classified" but is classified only when it reaches "adolescence".

In the early years of the American nuclear program, scientists expressed fear of unintentionally violating the Atomic Energy Act. Because declassifications were rare, researchers often could not tell what they were allowed to publish or even discuss. Recommendations therefore urged the AEC to "publish explicit and detailed catalogues of types of data not included in the restricted category," so that those working with nuclear matters would no longer face "the intolerable fear that publication of every research finding is a violation of the Atomic Energy Act of 1946."

== Risks to media coverage of nuclear incidents ==
Aryeh Neier, writing in 1980 for the Index on Censorship essay "USA: Born classified", warned that the born-secret doctrine could be invoked to suppress reporting on nuclear accidents and contamination. As examples of incidents he believed were inadequately reported due to secrecy, Neier cited three events. The Rocky Flats Plant near Denver, Colorado released plutonium and uranium into the atmosphere multiple times over years, including wastewater discharges. In the 1966 Palomares B-52 crash in Spain, a mid-air collision dropped undetonated thermonuclear weapons to the Earth. Following the 1966 B-52 crash, four bombs fell to earth; three were recovered on land near the fishing village of Palomares in the municipality of Cuevas del Almanzora, where the conventional explosives in two warheads detonated on impact, contaminating roughly 0.77 sq mi (2 km^{2}) with plutonium. The fourth bomb was located intact on the floor of the Mediterranean Sea after an 80-day search.

The 1961 Goldsboro B-52 crash in North Carolina was also cited by Neier, and was a "Broken Arrow" nuclear accident of the Cold War. In January 1961, the bomber had a rendezvous with a tanker for aerial refueling but suffered a fuel leak that led to the plane crashing with nuclear weapons aboard, which were released. The weapons began their firing sequences despite safeguards meant to prevent that from occurring. One of its nuclear bombs was judged by nuclear weapons engineers at the time to have been only one safety switch away from detonation, and that it was "credible" to imagine conditions under which it could have detonated. The other bomb did not get as far into its firing sequence and one of its major weapons components, the thermonuclear "secondary" stage, was regarded as irrecoverably lost after an extensive, failed effort to recover it. The National Security Archive later published additional declassified material on nuclear weapons safety and security issues.

Neier noted that editors of The Progressive cited such accidents and contamination incidents to argue, in the United States v. Progressive dispute, that nuclear secrecy had suppressed public discussion of safety and risk.

== John Aristotle Phillips ==
In 1976, Princeton University undergraduate John Aristotle Phillips designed, on paper, a nuclear weapon to demonstrate how easily such technology might be acquired by American adversaries. Although his design relied solely on publicly available information, the completed work was made classified and was therefore illegal to disseminate in the United States. Phillips reflected:

Suppose an average—or below-average in my case—physics student at a university could design a workable atomic bomb on paper. That would prove the point dramatically and show the federal government that stronger safeguards have to be placed on the manufacturing and use of plutonium. In short, if I could design a bomb, almost any intelligent person could.

== See also ==
- Classified information in the United States
- Critical Nuclear Weapon Design Information
- Defense Office of Prepublication and Security Review
- Donald Trump's disclosures of classified information
- Invention Secrecy Act
- Nuclear espionage
- Strong cryptography
- United States v. Reynolds

== Notes ==
- Bickelman, H. D. (February 1961). "Accident Report on B-52G Near Seymour Johnson Air Force Base North Carolina (SCDR 106-61)". Sandia Corporation (via the National Security Archive at George Washington University).
