= Classified information in the United States =

U.S. government classification system

The United States government classification system is established under Executive Order 13526, the latest in a long series of executive orders on the topic of classified information beginning in 1951. Issued by President Barack Obama in 2009, Executive Order 13526 replaced earlier executive orders on the topic and modified the regulations codified to 32 C.F.R. 2001. It lays out the system of classification, declassification, and handling of national security information generated by the U.S. government and its employees and contractors, as well as information received from other governments.

The desired degree of secrecy about such information is known as its sensitivity. Sensitivity is based upon a calculation of the damage to national security that the release of the information would cause. The United States has three levels of classification: Confidential, Secret, and Top Secret. Each level of classification indicates an increasing degree of sensitivity. Thus, if one holds a Top Secret security clearance, one is allowed to handle information up to the level of Top Secret, including Secret and Confidential information. If one holds a Secret clearance, one may not then handle Top Secret information, but may handle Secret and Confidential classified information.

The United States does not have a British-style Official Secrets Act. Instead, several laws protect classified information, including the Espionage Act of 1917, the Invention Secrecy Act of 1951, the Atomic Energy Act of 1954 and the Intelligence Identities Protection Act of 1982. A 2013 report to Congress noted that the relevant laws have been mostly used to prosecute foreign agents, or those passing classified information to them, and that leaks to the press have rarely been prosecuted. The legislative and executive branches of government, including US presidents, have frequently leaked classified information to journalists. Congress has repeatedly resisted or failed to pass a law that generally outlaws disclosing classified information. Most espionage law criminalizes only national defense information; only a jury can decide if a given document meets that criterion, and judges have repeatedly said that being "classified" does not necessarily make information become related to the "national defense". Furthermore, by law, information may not be classified merely because it would be embarrassing or to cover illegal activity; information may be classified only to protect national security objectives.

Over the past decades under most administrations the United States has released classified information to foreign governments for diplomatic goodwill, known as declassification diplomacy. An example includes information on Augusto Pinochet to the government of Chile. In October 2015, US secretary of state John Kerry provided Michelle Bachelet, Chile's president, with a pen drive containing hundreds of newly declassified documents.

== Terminology ==
Derivative classification activity 1996–2011

The U.S. government uses the term Controlled Unclassified Information to refer to information that is not Confidential, Secret, or Top Secret, but the dissemination of which is still restricted.

Reasons for such restrictions can include export controls, privacy regulations, court orders, and ongoing criminal investigations, as well as national security. Information that was never classified is sometimes referred to as "open source" by those who work in classified activities. Public Safety Sensitive (PSS) refers to information that is similar to Law Enforcement Sensitive but could be shared between the various public safety disciplines (Law Enforcement, Fire, and Emergency Medical Services).

Peter Louis Galison, a historian and director in the History of Science department at Harvard University, claims that the U.S. government produces more classified information than unclassified information.

Spillage is defined as a security incident that results in the transfer of classified information onto an information system not authorized to store or process that information.

== Levels and categories of classification ==
The United States government classifies sensitive information according to the degree to which the unauthorized disclosure would damage national security. The three primary levels of classification (from least to greatest) are Confidential, Secret, and Top Secret.

However, even Top Secret clearance does not allow one to access all information at, or below, Top Secret level. Access requires the clearance necessary for the sensitivity of the information, as well as a legitimate need to obtain the information. For example, all US military pilots are required to obtain at least a Secret clearance, but they may only access documents directly related to their orders.

To ensure that only those with a legitimate need to know can access information, classified information may have additional categorizations/markings and access controls that could prevent even someone with a sufficient level of clearance from seeing it. Examples of this include: Special Access Program (SAP), Sensitive Compartmented Information (SCI), Restricted Data (RD), Transclassified Foreign Nuclear Information (TFNI), and Alternative or Compensatory Control Measures (ACCM).

The classification system is governed by Executive Order rather than by law. An exception is information on nuclear weapons, materials and power, where levels of protection are specified in the Atomic Energy Act of 1954, see restricted data. Typically each president will issue a new executive order, either tightening classification or loosening it. The Clinton administration made a major change in the classification system by issuing an executive order that for the first time required all classified documents to be declassified after 25 years unless they were reviewed by the agency that created the information and determined to require continuing classification. Executive Order 13292, issued by President George W. Bush in 2003 relaxed some declassification requirements.

=== Primary levels ===
==== Confidential ====
This is the lowest classification level of information obtained by the government. It is defined as information that would "damage" national security if publicly disclosed, again, without the proper authorization.

Examples include information related to military strength and weapons.

During and before World War II, the U.S. had a category of classified information called Restricted, which was below confidential. The U.S. no longer has a Restricted classification, but many other countries and NATO documents do. The U.S. treats Restricted information it receives from other governments as Confidential. The U.S. does use the term restricted data in a completely different way to refer to nuclear secrets, as described below.

==== Secret ====
This is the second-highest classification. Information is classified Secret when its unauthorized disclosure would cause "serious damage" to national security. Most information that is classified is held at the secret sensitivity.

"Examples of serious damage include disruption of foreign relations significantly affecting the national security; significant impairment of a program or policy directly related to the national security; revelation of significant military plans or intelligence operations: compromise of significant military plans or intelligence operations; and compromise of significant scientific or technological developments relating to national security."

==== Top Secret ====
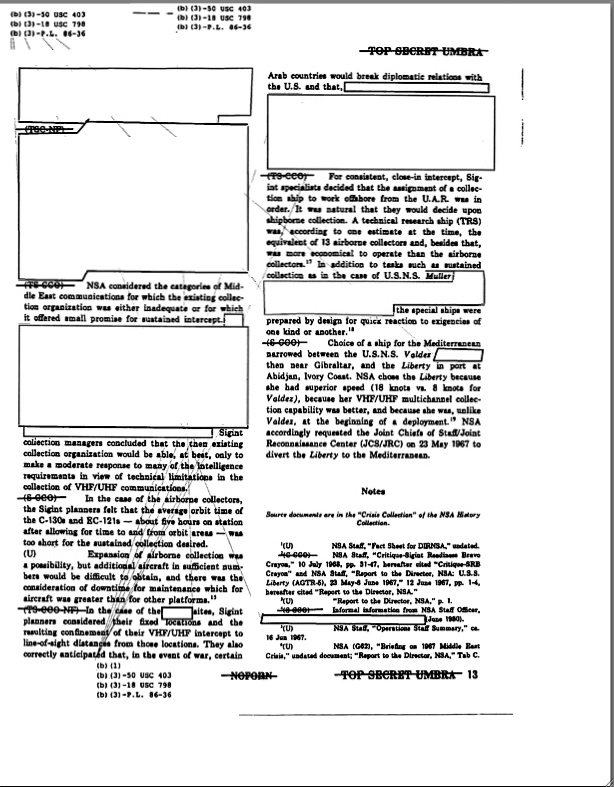
An example of a U.S. classified document; page 13 of a United States National Security Agency report on the USS Liberty incident, partially declassified and released to the public in July 2003. The original overall classification of the page, "Top Secret" code word UMBRA, is shown at top and bottom. The classification of individual paragraphs and reference titles is shown in parentheses—there are six different levels on this page alone. Notations with leader lines at top and bottom cite statutory authority for not declassifying certain sections.

The highest security classification. "Top Secret shall be applied to information, the unauthorized disclosure of which reasonably could be expected to cause 'exceptionally grave damage' to the National Security that the original classification authority is able to identify or describe." As of 2019, around 1.25 million individuals have Top Secret clearance.

"Examples of exceptionally grave damage include armed hostilities against the United States or its allies; disruption of foreign relations vitally affecting the national security; the compromise of vital national defense plans or complex cryptology and communications intelligence systems; the revelation of sensitive intelligence operations, and the disclosure of scientific or technological developments vital to national security."

=== Additional proscribed categories ===
Top Secret is the highest level of classification. However some information is further categorized/marked by adding a code word so that only those who have been cleared for each code word can see it. A document marked SECRET//SPECIAL ACCESS REQUIRED-[CODE WORD] could be viewed only by a person with a secret or top secret clearance and that specific code word clearance.

==== Special Access Program ====
Executive Order 13526, which forms the legal basis for the U.S. classification system, states that "information may be classified at one of the following three levels", with Top Secret as the highest level (Sec. 1.2). However, this executive order provides for special access programs that further restricted access to a small number of individuals and permit additional security measures (Sec. 4.3). These practices can be compared with (and may have inspired) the concepts multilevel security and role-based access control. U.S. law also has special provisions protecting information related to cryptography (18 USC 798), nuclear weapons and atomic energy (see Controls on atomic-energy information) and the identity of covert intelligence agents (see Intelligence Identities Protection Act).

==== Sensitive Compartmented Information ====
Classified information concerning or derived from sensitive intelligence sources, methods, or analytical processes. All SCI must be handled within formal access control systems established by the Director of National Intelligence.

==== Restricted Data/Formerly Restricted Data ====
Restricted Data (RD) and Formerly Restricted Data (FRD) are classification markings that concern nuclear information. These are the only two classifications that are established by federal law, being defined by the Atomic Energy Act of 1954. Nuclear information is not automatically declassified after 25 years. Documents with nuclear information covered under the Atomic Energy Act will be marked with a classification level (confidential, secret or top secret) and a restricted data or formerly restricted data marking.

Nuclear information as specified in the act may inadvertently appear in unclassified documents and must be reclassified when discovered. Even documents created by private individuals have been seized for containing nuclear information and classified. Only the Department of Energy may declassify nuclear information.

Most RD and FRD (as well as most classified information in general) are classified at either the Confidential or Secret levels; however they require extra RD/FRD specific clearances in addition to the clearance level.

=== Unclassified ===
Unclassified is not technically a classification; this is the default and refers to information that can be released to individuals without a clearance. Information that is unclassified is sometimes restricted in its dissemination as Controlled Unclassified Information. For example, the law enforcement bulletins reported by the U.S. media when the United States Department of Homeland Security raised the U.S. terror threat level were usually classified as "U//LES", or "Unclassified – Law Enforcement Sensitive". This information is supposed to be released only to law enforcement agencies (sheriff, police, etc.), but, because the information is unclassified, it is sometimes released to the public as well.

Information that is unclassified but which the government does not believe should be subject to Freedom of Information Act requests is often classified as Controlled Unclassified Information (CUI). In addition to CUI classification, information can be categorized according to its availability to be distributed, e.g., Distribution D may only be released to approved Department of Defense and U.S. Department of Defense contractor personnel.

The statement of NOFORN (meaning "no foreign nationals") is applied to any information that may not be released to any non-U.S. citizen. NOFORN and distribution statements are often used in conjunction with classified information or alone on Sensitive But Unclassified (SBU) information. Documents subject to export controls have a specific warning to that effect. Information which is "personally identifiable" is governed by the Privacy Act of 1974 and is also subject to strict controls regardless of its level of classification.

Finally, information at one level of classification may be "upgraded by aggregation" to a higher level. For example, a specific technical capability of a weapons system might be classified Secret, but the aggregation of all technical capabilities of the system into a single document could be deemed Top Secret.

Use of information restrictions outside the classification system is growing in the U.S. government. In September 2005 J. William Leonard, director of the U.S. National Archives Information Security Oversight Office, was quoted in the press as saying, "No one individual in government can identify all the controlled, unclassified [categories], let alone describe their rules."

==== Controlled Unclassified Information (CUI) ====
One of the 9/11 Commission findings was that "the government keeps too many secrets." To address this problem, the Commission recommended that '[t]he culture of agencies feeling they own the information they gathered at taxpayer expense must be replaced by a culture in which the agencies instead feel they have a duty ... to repay the taxpayers' investment by making that information available.'"

Due to over 100 designations in use by the U.S. government for unclassified information at the time, President George W. Bush issued a presidential memorandum on May 9, 2008, in an attempt to consolidate the various designations in use into a new category known as Controlled Unclassified Information (CUI). The CUI categories and subcategories were hoped to serve as the exclusive designations for identifying unclassified information throughout the executive branch not covered by Executive Order 12958 or the Atomic Energy Act of 1954 (as amended, though there is CUI//SP-UCNI now) but still required safeguarding or dissemination controls, pursuant to and consistent with any applicable laws, regulations, and government-wide policies in place at the time. CUI would replace categories such as For Official Use Only (FOUO), Sensitive But Unclassified (SBU) and Law Enforcement Sensitive (LES).

The presidential memorandum also designated the National Archives as responsible for overseeing and managing the implementation of the new CUI framework.

This memorandum has since been rescinded by Executive Order 13556 of November 4, 2010 and the guidelines previously outlined within the memo were expanded upon in a further attempt to improve the management of information across all federal agencies as well as establish a more standard, government-wide program regarding the controlled declassification designation process itself.

The U.S. Congress has attempted to take steps to resolve this, but did not succeed. The U.S. House of Representatives passed the Reducing Information Control Designations Act H.R. 1323 on March 17, 2009. The bill was referred to the Senate Committee on Homeland Security and Governmental Affairs. Because no action was taken in committee and bills expire at the end of every Congress, there is currently no bill to solve unclassified designations.

==== For Official Use Only (FOUO) ====
Among U.S. government information, FOUO was primarily used by the U.S. Department of Defense as a handling instruction for Controlled Unclassified Information (CUI) which may be exempt from release under exemptions two to nine of the Freedom of Information Act (FOIA). It is one of the various sub-categorizations for strictly unclassified information which, on 24 February 2012, was officially consolidated as CUI.

Other departments continuing the use of this designation include the Department of Homeland Security.

==== Public Trust ====
According to the Department of Defense, Public Trust is a type of position, not clearance level, though General Services Administration refers to it as clearance level. Certain positions which require access to sensitive information, but not information which is classified, must obtain this designation through a background check. Public Trust Positions can either be moderate-risk or high-risk.

== Proper procedure for classifying U.S. government documents ==
To be properly classified, a classification authority (an individual charged by the U.S. government with the right and responsibility to properly determine the level of classification and the reason for classification) must determine the appropriate classification level, as well as the reason information is to be classified. A determination must be made as to how and when the document will be declassified, and the document marked accordingly. Executive Order 13526 describes the reasons and requirements for information to be classified and declassified (Part 1). Individual agencies within the government develop guidelines for what information is classified and at what level.

The former decision is original classification. A great majority of classified documents are created by derivative classification. For example, if one piece of information, taken from a secret document, is put into a document along with 100 pages of unclassified information, the document, as a whole, will be secret. Proper rules stipulate that every paragraph will bear a classification marking of (U) for Unclassified, (C) for Confidential, (S) for Secret, and (TS) for Top Secret. Therefore, in this example, only one paragraph will have the (S) marking. If the page containing that paragraph is double-sided, the page should be marked SECRET on top and bottom of both sides.

A review of classification policies by the Office of the Director of National Intelligence aimed at developing a uniform classification policy and a single classification guide that could be used by the entire U.S. intelligence community. Significant interagency differences were found that impaired cooperation and performance. The initial ODNI review, completed in January 2008, found that "There appears to be no common understanding of classification levels among the classification guides reviewed by the team, nor any consistent guidance as to what constitutes 'damage,' 'serious damage,' or 'exceptionally grave damage' to national security."

=== Classification categories ===
Step 3 in the classification process is to assign a reason for the classification. Classification categories are marked by the number "1.4" followed by one or more letters (a) to (h):

- 1.4(a) military plans, weapons systems, or operations;
- 1.4(b) foreign government information;
- 1.4(c) intelligence activities, sources, or methods, or cryptology;
- 1.4(d) foreign relations or foreign activities of the United States, including confidential sources;
- 1.4(e) scientific, technological or economic matters relating to national security; which includes defense against transnational terrorism;
- 1.4(f) United States Government programs for safeguarding nuclear materials or facilities;
- 1.4(g) vulnerabilities or capabilities of systems, installations, infrastructures, projects or plans, or protection services relating to the national security, which includes defense against transnational terrorism; and/or
- 1.4(h) the development, production, or use of weapons of mass destruction.

== Classifying non-government-generated information ==
The Invention Secrecy Act of 1951 allows the suppression of patents (for a limited time) for inventions that threaten national security.

Whether information related to nuclear weapons can constitutionally be "born secret" as provided for by the Atomic Energy Act of 1954 has not been tested in the courts.

Guantanamo Bay detention camp has used a "presumptive classification" system to describe the statements of Guantanamo Bay detainees as classified. When challenged by Ammar al-Baluchi in the Guantanamo military commission hearing the 9/11 case, the prosecution abandoned the practice. Presumptive classification continues in the cases involving the habeas corpus petitions of Guantanamo Bay detainees.

== Protecting classified information ==
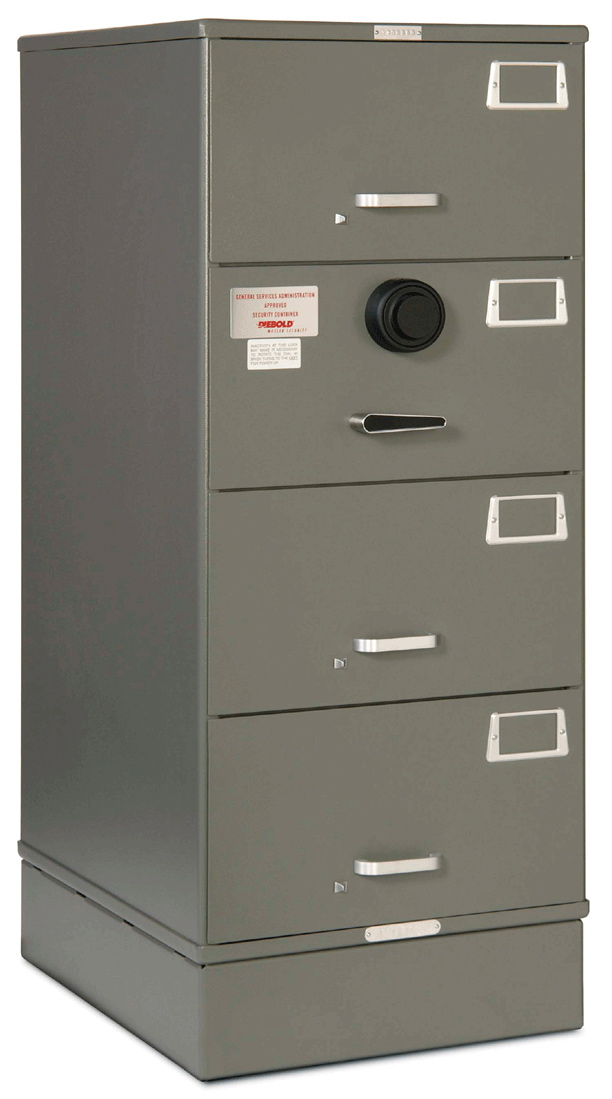
A GSA-approved security container

=== Facilities and handling ===
One of the reasons for classifying state secrets into sensitivity levels is to tailor the risk to the level of protection. The U.S. government specifies in some detail the procedures for protecting classified information. The rooms or buildings for holding and handling classified material must have a facility clearance at the same level as the most sensitive material to be handled. Good quality commercial physical security standards generally suffice for lower levels of classification. At the highest levels, people sometimes must work in rooms designed like bank vaults (see Sensitive Compartmented Information Facility – SCIF). The U.S. Congress has such facilities inside the Capitol Building, among other Congressional handling procedures for protecting confidentiality.

The U.S. General Services Administration sets standards for locks and containers used to store classified material. The most commonly-approved security containers resemble heavy-duty file cabinets with a combination lock in the middle of one drawer. In response to advances in methods to defeat mechanical combination locks, the U.S. government switched to electromechanical locks that limit the rate of attempts to unlock them. After a specific number of failed attempts, they will permanently lock, requiring a locksmith to reset them.

The most sensitive material requires two-person integrity, where two cleared individuals are responsible for the material at all times. Approved containers for such material have two separate combination locks, both of which must be opened to access the contents.

=== Marking ===
Classified U.S. government documents typically must be stamped with their classification on the cover and at the top and bottom of each page. Authors must mark each paragraph, title and caption in a document with the highest level of information it contains, usually by placing appropriate initials in parentheses at the beginning of the paragraph, title, or caption, for example (C), (S), (TS), (TS-SCI), etc., or (U) for unclassified.

=== Cover sheets ===
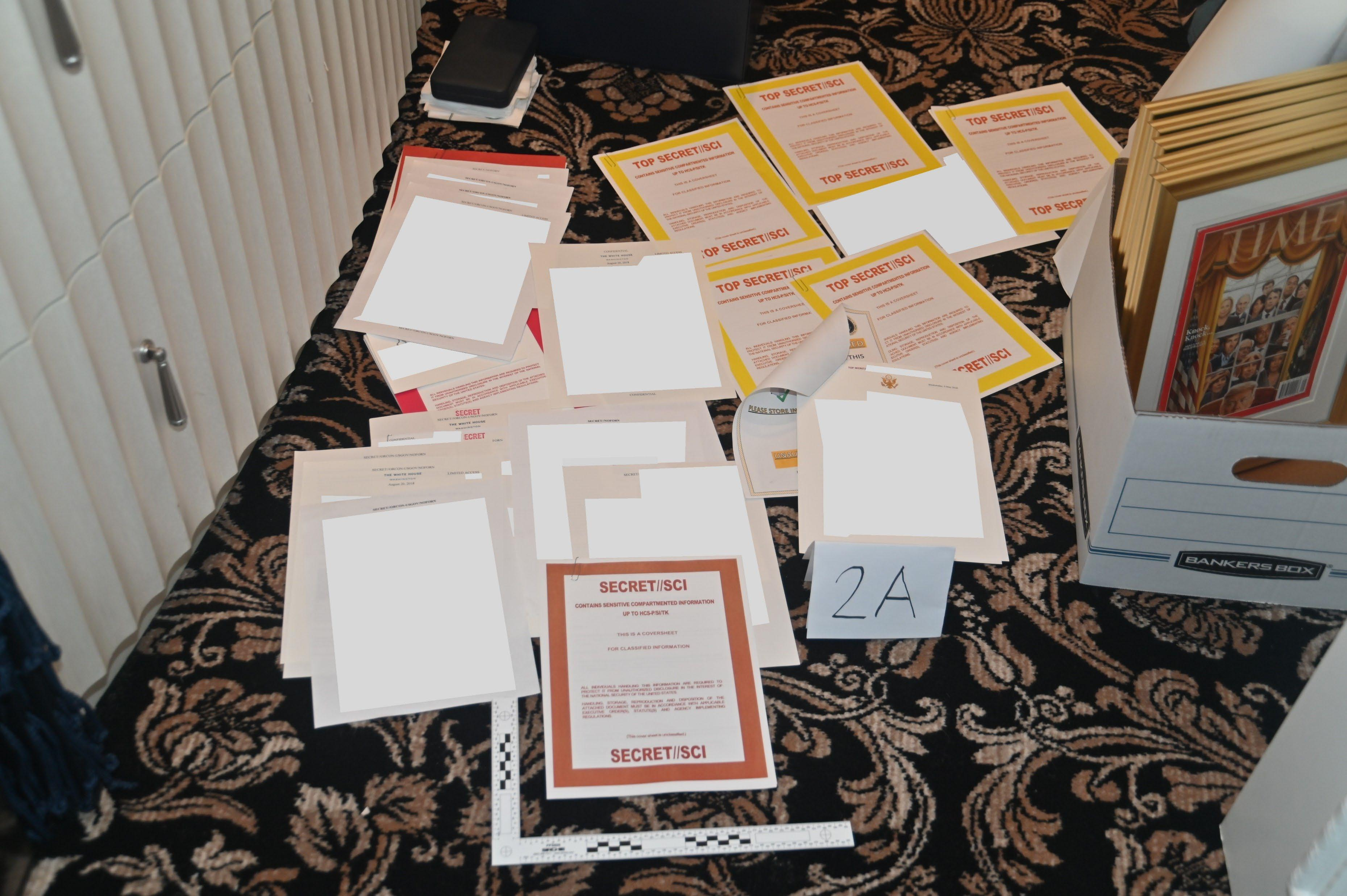
Classified documents with and without cover sheets found by the Federal Bureau of Investigation during its search of Mar-a-Lago, Donald Trump's home in Florida, in August 2022.

Commonly, one must affix a brightly colored cover sheet to the cover of each classified document to prevent unauthorized observation of classified material (shoulder surfing) and to remind users to lock up unattended documents. The cover sheets warn viewers of the sensitive nature of the enclosed material, but are themselves unclassified. Typical colors are blue for confidential, red for secret and orange for top secret.

=== Transmission ===
Restrictions dictate shipment methods for classified documents. Top Secret material must go by special courier, Secret material within the U.S. via registered mail, and Confidential material by certified mail. Electronic transmission of classified information largely requires the use of National Security Agency approved/certified "Type 1" cryptosystems using NSA's unpublished and classified Suite A algorithms. The classification of the Suite A algorithms categorizes the hardware that store them as a Controlled Cryptographic Item (CCI) under the International Traffic in Arms Regulations, or ITAR.

CCI equipment and keying material must be controlled and stored with heightened physical security, even when the device is not processing classified information or contains no cryptographic key. NSA is currently implementing what it calls Suite B, a group of commercial algorithms such as Advanced Encryption Standard (AES), Secure Hash Algorithm (SHA), Elliptic Curve Digital Signature Algorithm (ECDSA) and Elliptic curve Diffie–Hellman (ECDH). Suite B provides protection for data up to Top Secret on non-CCI devices, which is especially useful in high-risk environments or operations needed to prevent Suite A compromise. These less stringent hardware requirements stem from the device not having to "protect" classified Suite A algorithms.

Specialized computer operating systems known as trusted operating systems are available for processing classified information. These systems enforce the classification and labeling rules described above in software. Since 2005 they are not considered secure enough to allow uncleared users to share computers with classified activities. Thus, if one creates an unclassified document on a secret device, the resultant data is classified secret until it can be manually reviewed. Computer networks for sharing classified information are segregated by the highest sensitivity level they are allowed to transmit, for example, SIPRNet (Secret) and JWICS (Top Secret-SCI).

=== Destruction ===
The destruction of certain types of classified documents requires burning, shredding, pulping or pulverizing using approved procedures and must be witnessed and logged. Classified computer data presents special problems. See Data remanence.

=== Lifetime commitment ===
When a cleared individual leaves the job or employer for which they were granted access to classified information, they are formally debriefed from the program. Debriefing is an administrative process that accomplishes two main goals: it creates a formal record that the individual no longer has access to the classified information for that program; and it reminds the individual of their lifetime commitment to protect that information.

Typically, the individual is asked to sign another non-disclosure agreement (NDA), similar to that which they signed when initially briefed, and this document serves as the formal record. The debriefed individual does not lose their security clearance; they have only surrendered the need to know for information related to that particular job.

== Classifications and clearances between U.S. government agencies ==
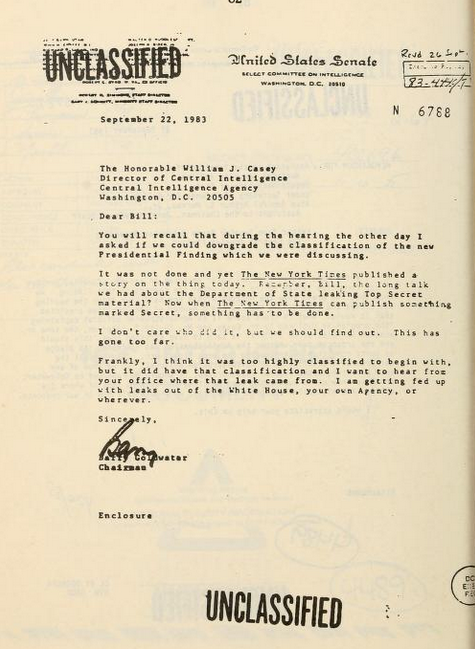
Senator Barry Goldwater reprimanding CIA director William J. Casey for Secret info showing up in The New York Times, but then saying it was over-classified to begin with. 1983

In the past, clearances did not necessarily transfer between various U.S. government agencies. For example, an individual cleared for Department of Defense Top Secret had to undergo another investigation before being granted a Department of Energy Q clearance. Agencies are now supposed to honor background investigations by other agencies if they are still current.

Because most security clearances only apply inside the agency where the holder works, if one needs to meet with another agency to discuss classified matters, it is possible and necessary to pass one's clearance to the other agency. For example, officials visiting at the White House from other government agencies would pass their clearances to the Executive Office of the President (EOP).

The Department of Energy security clearance required to access Top Secret Restricted Data, Formerly Restricted Data, and National Security Information, as well as Secret Restricted Data, is a Q clearance. The lower-level L clearance is sufficient for access to Secret Formerly Restricted Data and National Security Information, as well as Confidential Restricted Data and Formerly Restricted Data. In practice, access to Restricted Data is granted, on a need-to-know basis, to personnel with appropriate clearances. At one time, a person might hold both a TS and a Q clearance, but that duplication and cost is no longer required. For all practical purposes, Q is equivalent to Top Secret, and L is equivalent to Secret.

Contrary to popular belief, the Yankee White clearance given to personnel who work directly with the President is not a classification. Individuals having Yankee White clearances undergo extensive background investigations. The criteria include U.S. citizenship, unquestionable loyalty, and an absolute absence of any foreign influence over the individual, their family, or "persons to whom the individual is closely linked".

Also, they must not have traveled (save while in government employ and at the instructions of the United States) to countries that are considered to be unfriendly to the United States. Yankee White cleared personnel are granted access to any information for which they have a need to know, regardless of which organization classified it or at what level.

Access to certain information compartments, especially intelligence-related, may require a polygraph examination, and though the use of the polygraph is controversial, it is part of the suitability process for some agencies.

== Standard form 312 ==
Standard Form 312 (SF 312) is a non-disclosure agreement required under Executive Order 13292 to be signed by employees of the U.S. federal government or one of its contractors when they are granted a security clearance for access to classified information. The form is issued by the Information Security Oversight Office of the National Archives and Records Administration and its title is "Classified Information Nondisclosure Agreement." SF 312 prohibits confirming or repeating classified information to unauthorized individuals, even if that information is already leaked. The SF 312 replaces the earlier forms SF 189 or the SF 189-A. Enforcement of SF-312 is limited to civil actions to enjoin disclosure or seek monetary damages and administrative sanctions, "including reprimand, suspension, demotion or removal, in addition to the likely loss of the security clearance."

== Categories that are not classifications ==
Compartments also exist, that employ code words pertaining to specific projects and are used to more easily manage individual access requirements. Code words are not levels of classification themselves, but a person working on a project may have the code word for that project added to their file, and then will be given access to the relevant documents. Code words may also label the sources of various documents; for example, code words are used to indicate that a document may break the cover of intelligence operatives if its content becomes known. The World War II code word Ultra identified information found by decrypting German ciphers, such as the Enigma machine, and which—regardless of its own significance—might inform the Germans that Enigma was broken if they became aware that it was known.

=== Sensitive Compartmented Information (SCI) and Special Access Programs (SAP) ===
The terms "Sensitive Compartmented Information" (SCI) and "Special Access Program" (SAP) are widely misunderstood as classification levels or specific clearances.

In fact, the terms refer to methods of handling certain types of classified information that relate to specific national-security topics or programs (whose existence may not be publicly acknowledged) or the sensitive nature of which requires special handling, and thereby those accessing it require special approval to access it.

The paradigms for these two categories, SCI originating in the intelligence community and SAP in the Department of Defense, formalize 'Need to Know' and addresses two key logistical issues encountered in the day-to-day control of classified information:

- Individuals with a legitimate need to know may not be able to function effectively without knowing certain facts about their work. However, granting all such individuals a blanket DoD clearance (often known as a "collateral" clearance) at the Top Secret level would be undesirable, not to mention prohibitively expensive.

- The government may wish to limit certain types of sensitive information only to those who work directly on related programs, regardless of the collateral clearance they hold. Thus, even someone with a Top Secret clearance cannot gain access to its Confidential information unless it is specifically granted.

To be clear, "collateral" (formerly referred to as General Service or GENSER) simply means one lacks special access (e.g. SCI, SAP, COMSEC, NATO, etc.). Confidential, Secret, and Top Secret are all, by themselves, collateral clearance levels.

SAP and SCI are usually found at the Top Secret classification, but there is no prohibition of applying such segregation to Confidential and Secret information.

SAP and SCI implementation are roughly equivalent, and it is reasonable to discuss their implementation as one topic. For example, SAP material needs to be stored and used in a facility much like the SCIF described below.

Department of Energy information, especially the more sensitive SIGMA categories, may be treated as SAP or SCI.

==== Access to compartmented information ====
Personnel who require knowledge of SCI or SAP information fall into two general categories:

- Persons with a need to know
- Persons with actual access

Access to classified information is not authorized based on clearance status. Access is only permitted to individuals after determining they have a need to know. Need-to-know is a determination that an individual requires access to specific classified information in the performance of (or assist in the performance of) lawful and authorized government functions and duties.

To achieve selective separation of program information while still allowing full access to those working on the program, a separate compartment, identified by a unique codeword, is created for the information. This entails establishing communication channels, data storage, and work locations (SCIF—Sensitive Compartmented Information Facility), which are physically and logically separated not only from the unclassified world, but from general Department of Defense classified channels as well.

Thus established, all information generated within the compartment is classified according to the general rules above. However, to emphasize that the information is compartmented, all documents are marked with both the classification level and the codeword (and the caveat "Handle via <compartment name> Channels Only", or "Handle via <compartment names> Jointly" if the document contains material from multiple programs).

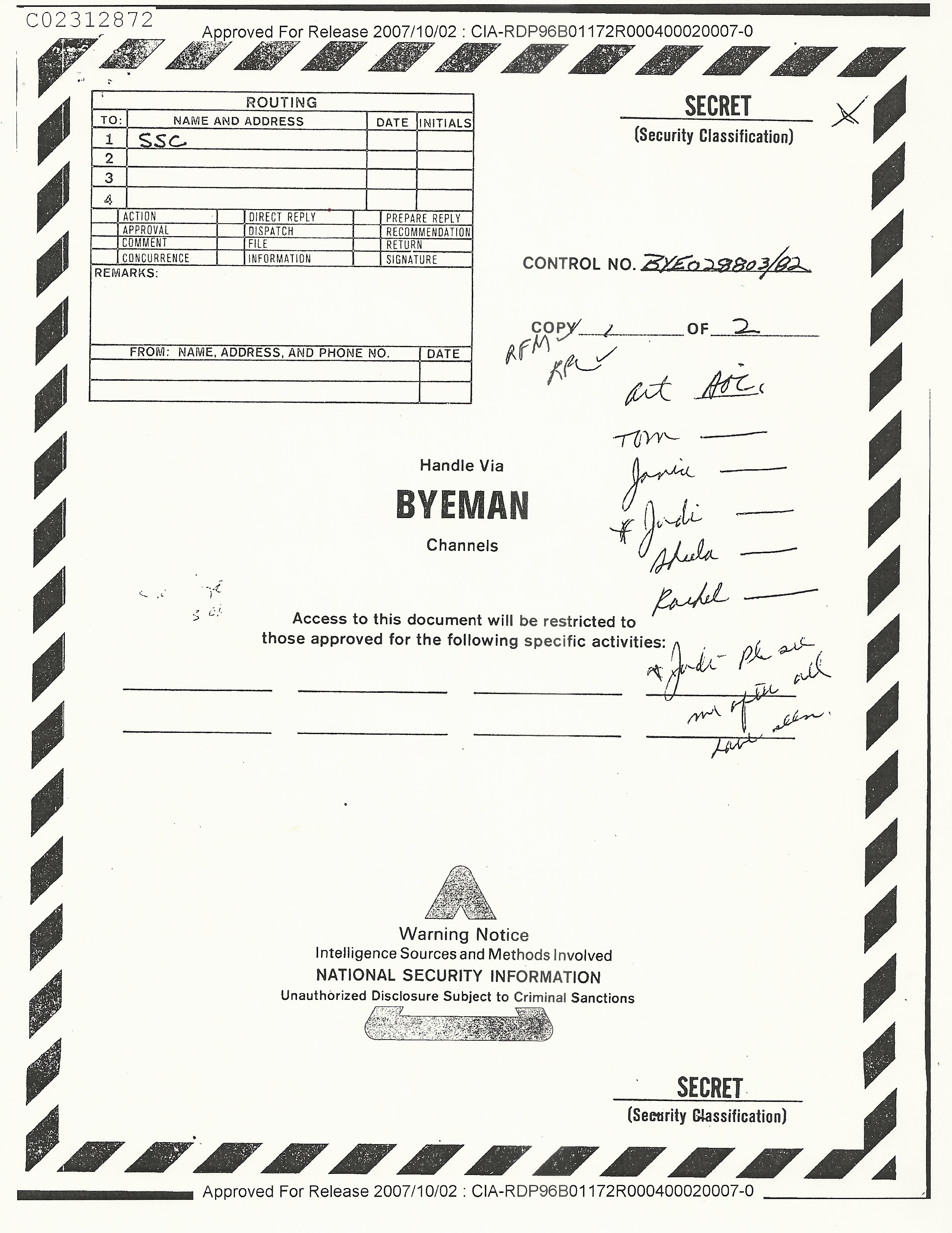
A cover sheet for information protected by the BYEMAN control system

A person is granted access to a specific compartment after the individual has: (a) had a Single Scope Background Investigation similar to that required for a collateral Top Secret clearance; (b) been "read into" or briefed on the nature and sensitivity of the compartment; and (c) signed a non-disclosure agreement (NDA).

Access does not extend to any other compartment; i.e., there is no single "SCI clearance" analogous to DoD collateral Top Secret. The requirements for DCID 6/4 eligibility (a determination that an individual is eligible for access to SCI), subsumes the requirements for a TS collateral clearance. Being granted DCID 6/4 eligibility includes the simultaneous granting of a TS collateral clearance, as adjudicators are required to adjudicate to the highest level that the investigation (SSBI) supports.

===== Examples =====
Examples of such control systems and subsystems are:

- SCI – Sensitive Compartmented Information
  - BYEMAN (BYE or B)
  - COMINT or Special Intelligence (SI)
    - Very Restricted Knowledge (VRK)
    - Exceptionally Controlled Information (ECI), which was used to group compartments for highly sensitive information, but was deprecated as of 2011.
    - GAMMA (SI-G)
  - ENDSEAL (EL)
  - HUMINT Control System (HCS)
  - KLONDIKE (KDK)
  - RESERVE (RSV)
  - TALENT KEYHOLE (TK)
- SAP – Special Access Programs
  - COPPER GREEN

==== Groups of compartmented information ====
SAPs in the Department of Defense are subdivided into three further groups, as defined in 10 U.S.C. § 119.

There is no public reference to whether SCI is divided in the same manner, but news reports reflecting that only the Gang of Eight members of Congress are briefed on certain intelligence activities, it may be assumed that similar rules apply for SCI or for programs with overlapping SAP and SCI content.

The groups for Department of Defense SAPs are:

- Acknowledged: appears as a line item as "classified project" or the equivalent in the federal budget, although details of its content are not revealed. The budget element will associate the SAP with a Department of Defense component organization, such as a Military Department (e.g. Department of the Navy), a Combatant Command (e.g. U.S. Special Operations Command) or a Defense Agency (e.g. Defense Information Systems Agency.)
- Unacknowledged: no reference to such SAPs is found in the publicly published federal budget; its funding is hidden in a classified annex, often called the "black budget". The Congressional defense committees, however, are briefed on the specifics of such SAPs.
- Waived: At the sole discretion of the Secretary of Defense, on a case-by-case basis in the interest of national security, there is no mention in the budget at all, and only the "Big 6" members of Congress: the chairman and Ranking Minority Members of the armed services committees, the appropriations committees and the defense appropriations subcommittees; receive notification of such SAPs.

Examples of SCI topics are human intelligence, communications intelligence, and intelligence collected by satellites. One or more compartments may be created for each area, and each of these compartments may contain multiple subcompartments (e.g., a specific HUMINT operation), themselves with their own code names.

Specific compartmented programs will have their own specific rules. For example, it is standard that no person is allowed unaccompanied access to a nuclear weapon or to command-and-control systems for nuclear weapons. Personnel with nuclear-weapons access are under the Personnel Reliability Program.

Some highly sensitive SAP or SCI programs may also use the "no lone zone" method (that is, a physical location into which no one is allowed to enter unaccompanied) described for nuclear weapons.

=== Handling caveats ===
The United States also has a system of restrictive caveats that can be added to a document: these are constantly changing, but can include (in abbreviated form) a requirement that the document not be shared with a civilian contractor or not leave a specific room. These restrictions are not classifications in and of themselves; rather, they restrict the dissemination of information within those who have the appropriate clearance level and possibly the need to know the information. Remarks such as "EYES ONLY" and "DO NOT COPY" also limit the restriction. One violating these directives might be guilty of violating a lawful order or mishandling classified information.

For ease of use, caveats and abbreviations have been adopted that can be included in the summary classification marking (header/footer) to enable the restrictions to be identified at a glance. They are sometimes known as Dissemination Control Abbreviations. Some of these caveats are (or were):

- CUI: Controlled Unclassified Information. Replaces the labels For Official Use Only (FOUO), Sensitive But Unclassified (SBU), and Law Enforcement Sensitive (LES).
  - FOUO: For Official Use Only. Superseded by CUI and no longer in use with the exception of Department of Homeland Security documents. Used for documents or products which contain material which is exempt from release under the Freedom of Information Act.
- NFIBONLY: National Foreign Intelligence Board Departments Only
- NOFORN (NF): Distribution to non-US citizens is prohibited, regardless of their clearance or access permissions (NO FOReign National access allowed).
- NOCONTRACTOR: Distribution to contractor personnel (non-US-government employees) is prohibited, regardless of their clearance or access permissions.
- ORCON (OC), ORCON-USGOV (OC-USGOV): Originator controls dissemination and/or release of the document.
- RSEN (RS): Risk Sensitive Notice.
- EXDIS (XD): Exclusive distribution
- RELIDO: Releasable by Information Disclosure Official
- PROPIN (PR): Caution—Proprietary Information Involved
- REL<country code(s)>: Distribution to citizens of the countries listed is permitted, providing they have appropriate accesses and need to know. Example: "REL TO USA, AUS, CAN, GBR, NZL" indicates that the information may be shared with appropriate personnel from Australia, the United Kingdom, Canada, and New Zealand.

- FVEY is the country code used as shorthand for the Five Eyes.

- <nn>X<m>: Information is exempt from automatic declassification (after the statutory default of 25 years) for exemption reason <m>, and declassification review shall not be permitted for <nn> years (as determined by law or the Interagency Security Classification Appeals Panel). For the most part, the exemption reasoning and caveats are outlined in paragraphs (b)–(d) and (g)–(i) of Sec. 3.3 of Executive Order 13526, but paragraph (b) is typically the one being referenced as the exemption reason value <m>.

Example: "50X1" indicates the information must remain classified for 50 years, since it pertains to intelligence activities, sources, or methods (reason (1) of Section 3.3, paragraph (b)).

- RESTRICTED: Distribution to non-US citizens or those holding an interim clearance is prohibited; certain other special handling procedures apply.
- FISA: is used in FISC and probably in FISCR since at least 2017.

Classification level and caveats are typically separated by "//" in the summary classification marking. For example, the final summary marking of a document might be:

SECRET//<compartment name>//ORCON/NOFORN

or

TOP SECRET//NOFORN/FISA

=== Controls on atomic-energy information ===
The Atomic Energy Act of 1954 sets requirements for protection of information about nuclear weapons and special nuclear materials. Such information is "classified from birth", unlike all other sensitive information, which must be classified by some authorized individual. However, authorized classifiers still must determine whether documents or material are classified or restricted.

The U.S. Department of Energy recognizes two types of Restricted Data:

- Restricted Data. Data concerning the design, manufacture, or utilization of atomic weapons; production of special nuclear material; or use of special nuclear material in the production of energy. RD-SIGMA-#, # represents the SIGMA number which may be 14, 15, 18, or 20.
- Formerly Restricted Data. Classified information jointly determined by the DOE and the Department of Defense to be related primarily to the military utilization of atomic weapons and removed from the Restricted Data category. FRD-SIGMA-#, # represents the SIGMA number which may be 14, 15, 18, or 20.

Documents containing such information must be marked "RESTRICTED DATA" (RD) or "FORMERLY RESTRICTED DATA" (FRD) in addition to any other classification marking. Restricted Data and Formerly Restricted Data are further categorized as Top Secret, Secret, or Confidential.

==== SIGMA categories and Critical Nuclear Weapon Design Information ====
RESTRICTED DATA contains further compartments. The Department of Energy establishes a list of SIGMA Categories for more fine-grained control than RESTRICTED DATA. Critical Nuclear Weapon Design Information (CNWDI, colloquially pronounced "Sin-Widdy") reveals the theory of operation or design of the components of a nuclear weapon. As such, it would be SIGMA 1 or SIGMA 2 material, assuming laser fusion is not involved in the information.

Access to CNWDI is supposed to be kept to the minimum number of individuals needed. In written documents, paragraphs containing the material, assuming it is Top Secret, would be marked (TS//RD-CNWDI). SIGMA information of special sensitivity may be handled much like SAP or SCI material (q.v.)

==== Naval Nuclear Propulsion Information ====
While most Naval Nuclear Propulsion Information (NNPI) is sensitive, it may or may not be classified. The desired power densities of naval reactors make their design peculiar to military use, specifically high-displacement, high-speed vessels. The proliferation of quieter- or higher-performance marine propulsion systems presents a national-security threat to the United States. Due to this fact, all but the most basic information concerning NNPI is classified. The United States Navy recognizes that the public has an interest in environmental, safety, and health information, and that the basic research the Navy carries out can be useful to industry.

== Sharing of classified information with other countries ==
In cases where the United States wishes to share classified information bilaterally (or multilaterally) with a country that has a sharing agreement, the information is marked with "REL TO USA", (release) and the three-letter country code. For example, if the U.S. wanted to release classified information to the government of Canada, it would mark the document "REL TO USA, CAN". There are also group releases, such as NATO, FVEY or UKUSA. Those countries would have to maintain the classification of the document at the level originally classified (Top Secret, Secret, etc.).

== Claims of U.S. government misuse of the classification system ==
It is desired that no document be released which refers to experiments with humans and might have adverse effect on public opinion or result in legal suits. Documents covering such work field should be classified 'secret'.

— April 17, 1947 Atomic Energy Commission memo from Colonel O. G. Haywood Jr. to Dr. Fidler at the Oak Ridge Laboratory in Tennessee

=== Excessive secrecy ===
While the classification of information by the government is not supposed to be used to prevent information from being made public that would be simply embarrassing or reveal criminal acts, it has been alleged that the government routinely misuses the classification system to cover up criminal activity and potentially embarrassing discoveries.

Steven Aftergood, director of the Project on Government Secrecy at the Federation of American Scientists notes that

... inquiring into classified government information and disclosing it is something that many national security reporters and policy analysts do, or try to do, every day. And with a few narrow exceptions—for particularly sensitive types of information—courts have determined that this is not a crime." Aftergood notes, "The universe of classified information includes not only genuine national security secrets, such as confidential intelligence sources or advanced military technologies, but an endless supply of mundane bureaucratic trivia, such as 50-year-old intelligence budget figures, as well as the occasional crime or cover-up.

As early as 1956, the U.S. Department of Defense estimated that 90% of its classified documents could be publicly disclosed with no harm to national security. The National Security Archive has collected a number of examples of overclassification and government censors blacking out documents that have already been released in full, or redacting entirely different parts of the same document at different times. In a similar vein, an official named William G. Florence, who for decades had a major role in writing the secrecy regulations and classification system for the Pentagon, in 1971 testified to Congress that at most 5% of information labeled classified, confidential, secret, or top secret really merited such designation at the time it was so designated, and that 3–4 years later only a tenth of that 5% still deserved such designation, according to an account of the testimony by Pentagon whistleblower Daniel Ellsberg.

A 2007 research report by Harvard history professor Peter Galison, published by the Federation of American Scientists, claimed that the classified universe in the US "is certainly not smaller and very probably is much larger than this unclassified one. ... [And] secrecy ... is a threat to democracy."

=== Prosecution for disclosing classified information ===
In the Pentagon Papers case, a classified study was published revealing that four administrations had misled the American public about their intentions in the Vietnam War, increasing the credibility gap. Tony Russo and Daniel Ellsberg were prosecuted under espionage law. The case prompted Harold Edgar & Benno C. Schmidt Jr. to write a review of espionage law in the 1973 Columbia Law Review. Their article was entitled "The Espionage Statutes and Publication of Defense Information". In it, they point out that espionage law does not criminalize classified information, only national defense information. They point out that Congress has repeatedly resisted or failed to make the disclosing of classified information illegal, in and of itself. Instead, Congress has strictly limited which sort of classified information is illegal, and under which specific circumstances it is illegal. i.e. in 18 U.S.C. § 798 Congress specifically criminalized leaking cryptographic information that is classified, but when it passed the law it specifically stated the law did not criminalize disclosing other types of classified information. Another article that discusses the issue is by Jennifer Elsea of the Congressional Research Service.

== Responsible agencies ==
Any agency designated by the President can originate classified information if it meets the content criteria. Each agency is responsible for safeguarding and declassifying its own documents. The National Archives and Records Administration (NARA) has custody of classified documents from defunct agencies, and houses the National Declassification Center (since 2010) and Information Security Oversight Office. The Interagency Security Classification Appeals Panel has representatives from the United States Department of State, United States Department of Justice; the National Archives, the Office of the Director of National Intelligence (DNI); the National Security Advisor (NSA); the Central Intelligence Agency (CIA); and Information Security Oversight Office.

== Declassification ==
Declassification is the process of removing the classification of a document and opening it for public inspection.

=== Automatic declassification ===
In accordance with Executive Order 13526, published January 5, 2010 (which superseded Executive Order 12958, as amended), an executive agency must declassify its documents after 25 years unless they fall under one of the nine narrow exemptions outlined by section 3.3 of the order. Classified documents 25 years or older must be reviewed by any and all agencies that possess an interest in the sensitive information found in the document. Documents classified for longer than 50 years must concern human intelligence sources or weapons of mass destruction, or get special permission. All documents older than 75 years must have special permission.

== See also ==
- Controlled Cryptographic Item
- Copyright status of works by the federal government of the United States
- Espionage Act of 1917
- Invention Secrecy Act
- List of U.S. security clearance terms
- McCollum memo
- Q clearance
- Secrecy News, a newsletter that covers U.S. classification policy
- Sensitive Compartmented Information
- Sensitive Security Information, generally transportation security information such as airport passenger screening or commercial aircraft security
- United States diplomatic cables leak, the leak by Chelsea Manning via WikiLeaks
- United States v. Reynolds
