= Energy Reorganization Act of 1974 =

Law regulating nuclear energy oversight

- Long title: An Act to reorganize and consolidate certain functions of the Federal Government in a new Energy Research and Development Administration and in a new Nuclear Regulatory Commission in order to promote more efficient management of such functions.
- Nicknames: Energy Research Reorganization Act
- Enacted by: the 93rd United States Congress
- Effective: October 11, 1974

Citations
- Public law: 93-438
- Statutes at Large: 88 Stat. 1233

Codification
- Titles amended: 42 U.S.C.: Public Health and Social Welfare
- U.S.C. sections created: 42 U.S.C. ch. 73 § 5801 et seq.

Legislative history
- Introduced in the House as H.R. 11510 by Chester E. Holifield (D–CA) on November 15, 1973; Committee consideration by House Government Operations, Senate Government Operations; Passed the House on December 19, 1973 (355-25); Passed the Senate on August 15, 1974 (passed, in lieu of S. 2744); Reported by the joint conference committee on October 8, 1974; agreed to by the House on October 9, 1974 (372-1) and by the Senate on October 10, 1974 (agreed); Signed into law by President Gerald R. Ford on October 11, 1974

The Energy Reorganization Act of 1974 (Pub. L. 93–438, 88 Stat. 1233, enacted October 11, 1974, codified at 42 U.S.C.A. § 5801) is a United States federal law that established the Nuclear Regulatory Commission. Under the Atomic Energy Act of 1954, a single agency, the U.S. Atomic Energy Commission, had responsibility for the development and production of nuclear weapons and for both the development and the safety regulation of the civilian uses of nuclear materials. The Act of 1974 split these functions, assigning to the Energy Research and Development Administration (now the United States Department of Energy) the responsibility for the development and production of nuclear weapons, promotion of nuclear power, and other energy-related work, and assigning to the NRC the regulatory work, which does not include regulation of defense nuclear facilities. The Act of 1974 gave the Commission its collegial structure and established its major offices.

A later amendment to the Act also provided protections for employees, and whistleblowers, who raise nuclear safety concerns. Whistleblowers who believe they suffered retaliation for their protected activities have to file a written complaint with the United States Department of Labor (DOL) within 180 days of the first notice of the adverse action. The whistleblowers would later have a choice to have their claim heard by a DOL administrative law judge or to file a lawsuit in court and seek a trial to a judge or jury.

== Provisions of the act ==
The Energy Reorganization Act of 1974 provided several policy elements regarding the Atomic Energy Commission and Nuclear Energy research.

Creation of the NRC:

- Established the Nuclear Regulatory Commission as an independent agency responsible for regulating civilian nuclear power plants and materials.

=== Division of responsibilities ===
- Split the Atomic Energy Commission's functions, assigning nuclear weapons development to the Department of Defense and civilian nuclear power regulation to the NRC.

=== Employee protection ===
- Included provisions protecting employees who raise concerns about nuclear safety from retaliation, known as "whistleblower protection".

=== Research and development focus ===
- Created the Energy Research and Development Administration to focus on research and development of various energy sources, including fossil fuels and nuclear power.

== See also ==
- Atomic Energy Act of 1946
- Nuclear Regulatory Commission
- Nuclear Non-Proliferation Act of 1978
- Atomic Energy Act of 1954
- Energy Research and Development Administration
- United States Department of Energy
- Nuclear power
- United States energy law
- 1974 in the environment
