= High explosive violent reaction =

Type of explosion

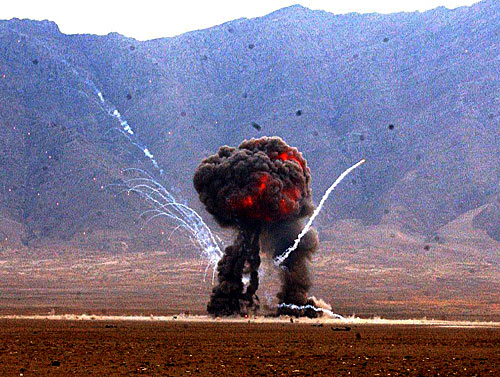
Detonation or deflagration? HEVR

A high explosive violent reaction (HEVR) includes reactions ranging from a fast deflagration of the high explosive (HE), up to and including a detonation of the high explosive. The explosive wave may be subsonic or supersonic.

== Discussion ==
In the mid-1990s, scientists and engineers working at the United States Department of Energy's National Security Laboratories began applying Probabilistic Risk Assessment methodologies to understand and enhance nuclear-weapon-safety over a life cycle. Probabilistic Risk Assessment (PRA) generally address three basic questions:

1. What can go wrong, or what are the initiators or initiating events (undesirable starting events) that lead to adverse consequence(s) (e.g., a nuclear-weapon accident, incident or off-normal event)?
2. What and how severe are the potential detriments, or the adverse consequences from the initiating event?
3. What is the likelihood of these adverse consequences, or what are the probabilities or frequencies of occurrence?

Addressing questions two and three required weapon-scientists and engineers to develop methods and terminologies to estimate and describe warhead-response to abnormal environments (e.g., identified initiating events) with a focus on the potential for release or dispersal of special nuclear material (SNM). Nuclear yield from abnormal environments was not part of the PRA focus because all of the United States' nuclear weapons are required to adhere to strict one-point-safety standards. To describe PRA warhead-response possibilities, weaponeers categorized SNM dispersal outcomes into three possible categories:

- Mechanical dispersal due to breach of the pit (localized scatter with no aerosolization);
- Combustion dispersal due to burning of the HE and SNM (approximately 0.1% aerosolization); and
- HEVR dispersal defined as an explosion or "violent" reaction that outside of a laboratory or test-range environment can only be described as a continuum from violent deflagration to detonation (assumed 100% aerosolization).

Since the advent of applying PRA methodologies to nuclear-weapon safety in the mid-1990s, the term HEVR has gained wide usage among scientists and engineers working in the fields of explosive science, safety, and surety.
