= Special nuclear material =

Classification of fissile nuclear material

Special nuclear material (SNM) is a term used by the United States Nuclear Regulatory Commission to classify fissile materials. The NRC divides special nuclear material into three main categories, according to the risk and potential for its direct use in a clandestine nuclear weapon or for its use in the production of nuclear material for use in a nuclear weapon.

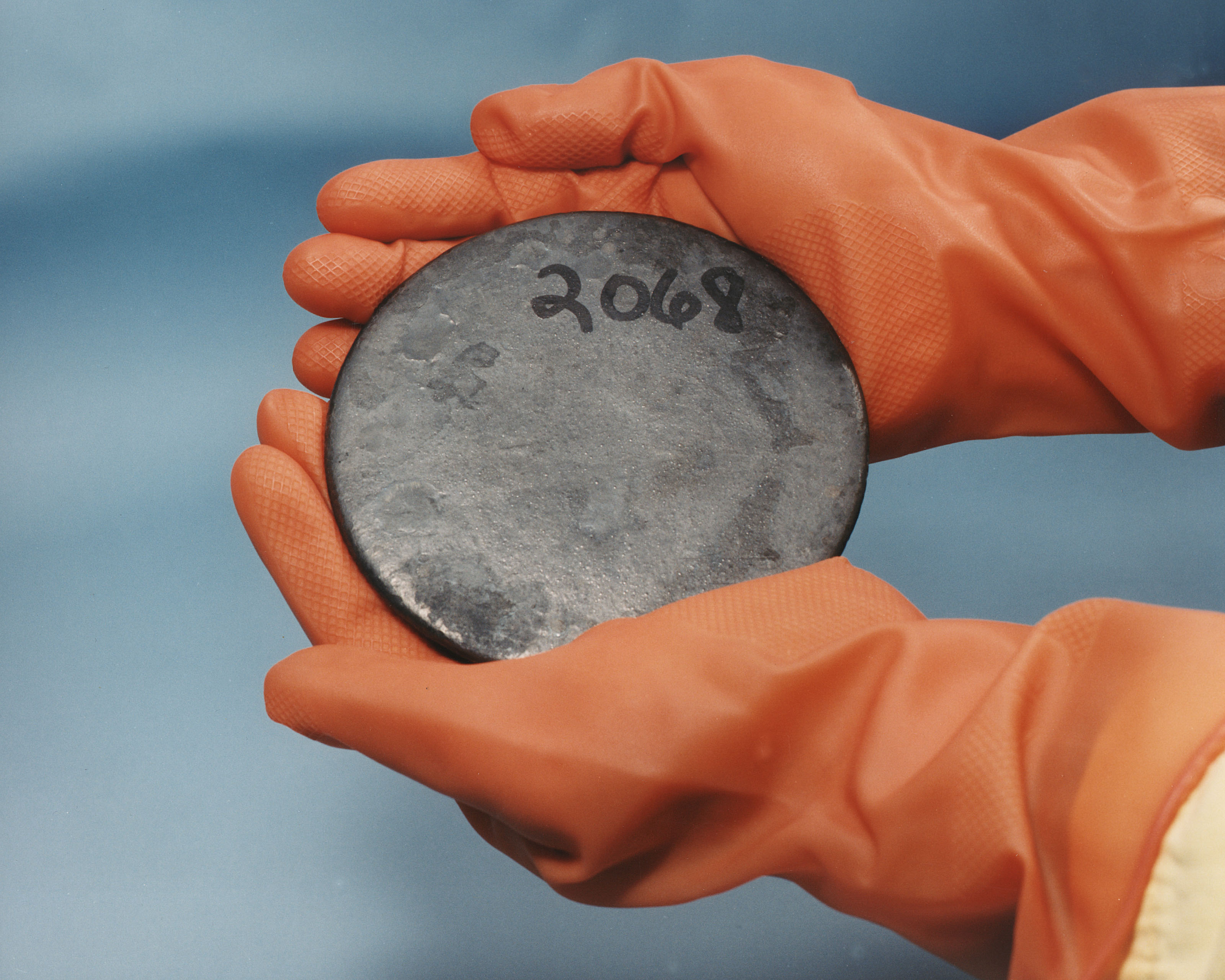
Highly-enriched uranium

== History ==
The Atomic Energy Act of 1946 gave the newly-formed Atomic Energy Commission ownership over all 'Fissionable Materials', explicitly including uranium-235 and plutonium. The AEC was given authority to classify materials as fissionable, as well as to control access to such material, along with access to Restricted Data. Under the amended version of the Atomic Energy Act of 1954, such materials were redefined as Special Nuclear Material, as well as updated to include uranium-233.

After the creation of the Nuclear Regulatory Commission by the Energy Reorganization Act, it took over the responsibility of classifying and controlling access to SNM.

== Materials ==
Special Nuclear Material refers only to uranium-235, uranium-233, and plutonium.

The term Strategic Special Nuclear Material (SSNM) refers to uranium-235 contained in uranium enriched above 20 percent (highly-enriched uranium), as well as any concentration of uranium-233 or plutonium.

The distinction between SNM and SSNM is due to the fact that uranium-235 is typically found mixed with other isotopes such as uranium-238. Plutonium-239 is made in a nuclear reactor by irradiating uranium-238 with neutrons, and uranium-233 is made the same way using thorium-232. Since they are different elements than the source material, they can be separated relatively easily through chemical processes. However, uranium-235 is produced from uranium ore, which contains 0.7% uranium-235 with most of the rest consisting of uranium-238. Since they are the same element, they behave in similar ways and must be separated by their slightly different atomic masses. This process is far more difficult than chemical separation. Since highly-enriched uranium is required for nuclear weapons, but low-enriched uranium is commonly used in nuclear power plants, it is classified both by its quantity and enrichment percentage.

== Categories ==
The NRC defines the three categories of SNM.

=== Category I ===
Category I (Strategic SNM) is defined as SSNM in any combination in a quantity of

- 2 kilograms (4.4 pounds) or more of Pu-239; or
- 5 kilograms or more of U-235 (11 pounds; contained in uranium enriched to 20 percent or more in the U-235 isotope); or
- 2 kilograms (4.4 pounds) or more of U-233; or
- 5 kilograms (11 pounds) or more in any combination computed by the equation grams = (grams contained U-235) + 2.5 (grams U-233 + grams Pu-239).

These combinations are referred to as a formula quantity.

Formula quantities of Special Nuclear Material
^{235}U	5 kg
^{233}U	2 kg
^{239}Pu	2 kg
0.4×^{235}U + ^{233}U + ^{239}Pu	2 kg

=== Category II ===
Category II (Special nuclear material of moderate strategic significance) is defined as

- Less than a formula quantity of strategic special nuclear material but more than 1,000 grams of uranium-235 (contained in uranium enriched to 20 percent or more in the U-235 isotope) or more than 500 grams of uranium-233 or plutonium-239, or in a combined quantity of more than 1,000 grams (2.2 pounds) when computed by the equation grams = (grams contained U-235) + 2 (grams U-233 + grams Pu-239); or
- 10,000 grams (22 pounds) or more of uranium-235 (contained in uranium enriched to 10 percent or more but less than 20 percent in the U-235 isotope).

=== Category III ===
Category III (Special nuclear material of low strategic significance) is:

- Less than an amount of special nuclear material of moderate strategic significance (see category II above) but more than 15 grams (0.5 oz) of uranium-235 (contained in uranium enriched to 20 percent or more in U-235 isotope) or 15 grams of uranium-233 or 15 grams of plutonium-239 or the combination of 15 grams when computed by the equation grams = (grams contained U-235) + (grams Pu-239) + (grams U-233); or
- Less than 10,000 grams but more than 1,000 grams of uranium-235 (contained in uranium enriched to 10 percent or more but less than 20 percent in the U-235 isotope); or
- 10,000 grams or more of uranium-235 (contained in uranium enriched above natural but less than 10 percent in the U-235 isotope).

== Access ==
Individuals with access to special nuclear material require an access authorization (security clearance) from the NRC or DOE.

The NRC defines two levels of Special Nuclear Material Access Authorization, NRC-U and NRC-R, in addition to the standard Department of Energy Access Authorizations L and Q.

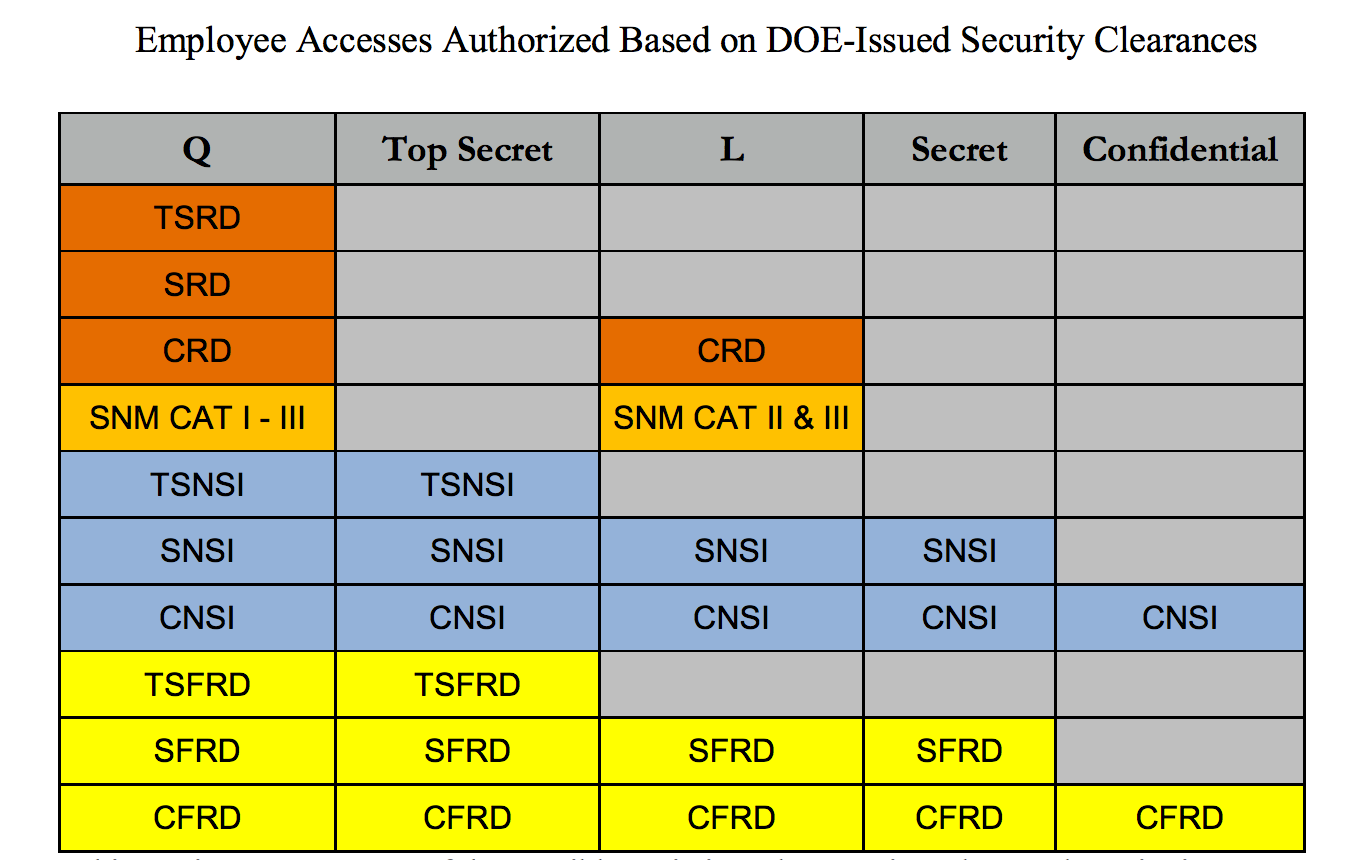
DOE and DOD clearance levels

Individuals with Q access authorization are permitted access to all three categories of SNM, while L access authorization only allows access to categories II and III.

The NRC SNM access authorization levels (U and R) are given to individuals who are employed by an NRC contractor, licensee, or contractor of a licensee and who requires access to SNM, while NRC employees are given either Q or L depending on their position sensitivity. NRC-R requires the same Tier 3 background investigation as L, and permits access to protected areas in nuclear facilities. NRC-U requires a Tier 5 investigation, similar to Q, and allows access to all three categories of nuclear material. All individuals responsible for the transport of SNM are required to possess NRC-U.
