= Q clearance =

U.S. Department of Energy security clearance level

- Seal of the U.S. Department of Energy

Q clearance or Q access authorization is the U.S. Department of Energy (DOE) security clearance required to access Top Secret Restricted Data, Formerly Restricted Data, and National Security Information, as well as Secret Restricted Data. Restricted Data (RD) is defined in the Atomic Energy Act of 1954 and covers nuclear weapons and related materials. The lower-level L clearance is sufficient for access to Secret Formerly Restricted Data (FRD) and National Security Information, as well as Confidential Restricted Data and Formerly Restricted Data. Access to Restricted Data is granted on a need-to-know basis to personnel with appropriate clearances.

A Q Clearance is equivalent to a U.S. Department of Defense Top Secret clearance. According to the Department of Energy, "Q access authorization corresponds to the background investigation and administrative determination similar to what is completed by other agencies for a Top Secret National Security Information access clearance."

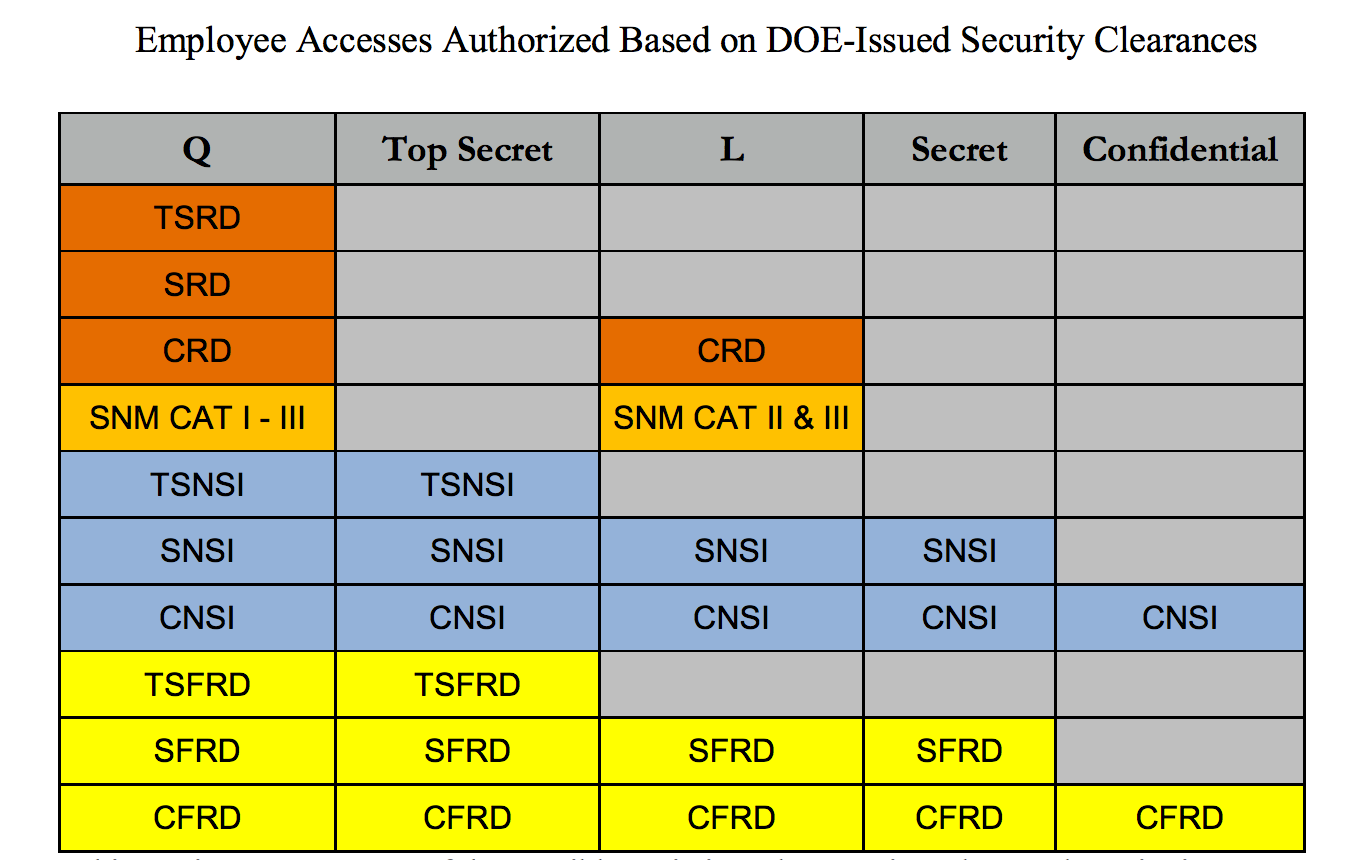
Access authorizations based on clearance level

In addition to classification levels, three categories of classified matter are identified: Restricted Data (RD), Formerly Restricted Data (FRD), and National Security Information (NSI), as well as a class of access-restricted materials: special nuclear material (SNM). The employee must have a security level clearance consistent with their assignment. Common combinations are reflected in the table on the right/above.

Much of the DOE information at this level requires access to Critical Nuclear Weapon Design Information (CNWDI, pronounced "SIN-widee"). Such information bears the page marking Top Secret//RD-CNWDI and the paragraph marking (TS-N) or (TS//RD-CNWDI). The DOE security clearance process is overseen by the Department of Energy Office of Hearings and Appeals.

DOE clearances apply for access specifically relating to atomic- or nuclear-related materials ("Restricted Data" under the Atomic Energy Act of 1954). The clearance is issued predominantly to non-military personnel. In 1946, U.S. Army Counter Intelligence Corps Major William L. Uanna, in his capacity as the first Chief of the Central Personnel Clearance Office at the newly formed Atomic Energy Commission, named and established the criteria for the Q Clearance. The security clearance process at the DOE is adjudicated by the DOE Office of Hearings and Appeals (OHA), where an individual whose security clearance is at issue may seek to appeal a security clearance decision to an administrative judge, and subsequently, to an appeal panel.

As of 1993, Q Clearances required a single-scope background investigation of the previous ten years of the applicant's life by both the Office of Personnel Management and the Federal Bureau of Investigation, and as of 2019, cost $5,596.

As of April 2021, there were 92,177 people who held a Q clearance.

== In popular culture ==
- In Robert Heinlein's 1956 novel The Door Into Summer, the narrator says his pre-1960 Q clearance let him "soak up" much classified technology.
- "Q" Clearance was a 1986 novel by Peter Benchley, satirizing Cold War secrecy and politics.
- In "Nellis", episode 7 of season 6 of the television show Archer, Sterling Archer uses a Q clearance to gain access to Area 51 after landing illegally on the airstrip.
- In the 2022 film Moonfall, Jocinda Fowler (Halle Berry) is given Q clearance by the director of NASA (Albert Hutchings) who gives her his ID access badge once he determines that collision with the Moon is imminent.
- In the 2023 film Oppenheimer, the 1954 security hearing to review J. Robert Oppenheimer’s Q clearance is a central focus.

=== In politics ===
The QAnon conspiracy theory is named such because the 4chan and 8chan posters, who in 2017 created the persona behind the conspiracy theory, claim to be an individual with Q level security clearance.

== See also ==
- Classified information in the United States
