= Restricted Data =

Legal category of US nuclear secrets

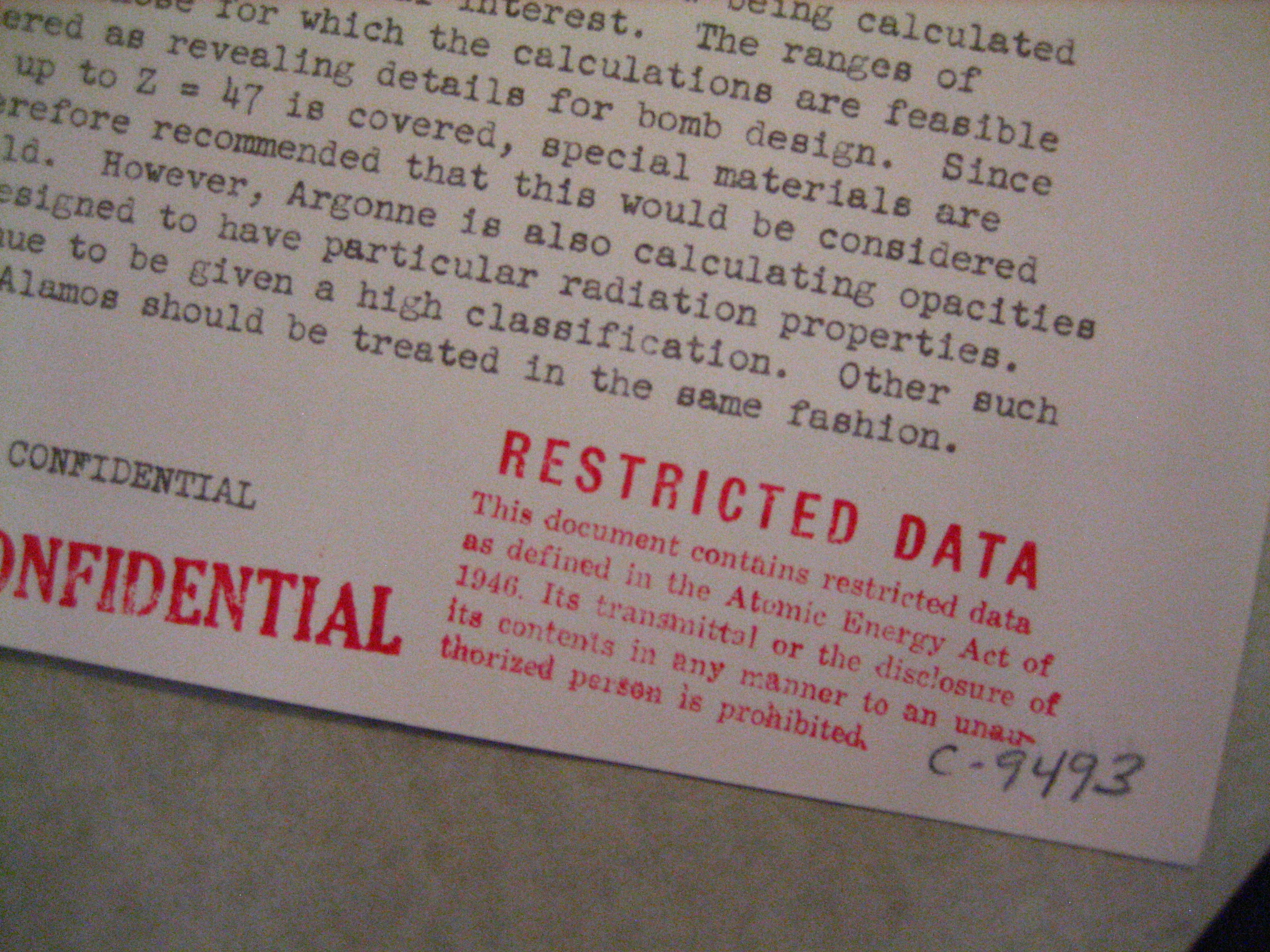
A 1946 "Restricted Data" stamp on an Atomic Energy Commission document

Restricted Data (RD) is a category of classified information in the United States that is defined by the Atomic Energy Act of 1954 as:

all data concerning (1) design, manufacture, or utilization of atomic weapons; (2) the production of special nuclear material; or (3) the use of special nuclear material in the production of energy, but shall not include data declassified or removed from the Restricted Data category pursuant to section 142 [of the Act].

The fact that its legal definition includes "all data" except that already specifically declassified has been interpreted to mean that atomic energy information in the United States is born classified, even if it was not created by any agency of the U.S. government. The authority of the United States Department of Energy (DOE) to implement this authority as a form of prior restraint was only once tested in court, with inconclusive results.

"Restricted Data" should not be confused with the classification category of "Restricted", a relatively low category of classification. "Restricted Data" is not a level of classification; rather, a document can be classified as Confidential, Secret, or Top Secret, while also containing "Restricted Data." In addition, a document containing Restricted Data could also contain Critical Nuclear Weapon Design Information (CNWDI). In this way, a document, for instance, could be classified as "Secret" (S), "Secret//Restricted Data" (S//RD), or "Secret//Restricted Data-Critical Nuclear Weapon Design Information" (S//RD-CNWDI) depending on the type of information a document contains.

Access to Restricted Data requires an L clearance or a Q clearance from the Department of Energy.

== History ==
The concept was initially introduced, with similar wording, in the Atomic Energy Act of 1946. It was added at a relatively late moment to the bill by its creators, after the Gouzenko affair was leaked to the press and caused a fear of loss of "the secret" of the atomic bomb, as well as fears that the Espionage Act of 1917 was not sufficiently adequate.

The Atomic Energy Act of 1946 further specified that anyone who:

communicates, transmits, or discloses... any document, writing, sketch, photograph, plan, model, instrument, appliance, note, or information involving or incorporating restricted data... to any individual or person, or attempts or conspires to any of the foregoing, with intent to injure the United States or with intent to secure an advantage to any foreign nation, upon conviction thereof, shall be punished by death or imprisonment for life... or, by a fine of not more than $20,000 or imprisonment for not more than twenty years, or both...

The act empowered and required the then-newly-created Atomic Energy Commission to regulate Restricted Data both internally and externally.

The Atomic Energy Act did not give the Atomic Energy Commission the authority to declare that a piece of information was or was not Restricted Data. Rather, it defines certain categories of information as inherently being Restricted Data, and thus "born secret". The Atomic Energy Commission thus determines that documents contain Restricted Data, and they are authorized to remove specific facts from the category of Restricted Data, but they are not authorized to fundamentally increase the scope of the definition of Restricted Data. This was intentional, as Senator Brien McMahon explained at the time the bill was proposed, as it was intended to allay fears that the federal government could endlessly and arbitrarily expand the definition of what was secret beyond what was dictated by Congress: "The Commission's withdrawal power can only reduce — it cannot enlarge — the scope of the crime."

The Atomic Energy Act revisions of 1954 effected some minor changes to the original 1946 definition, adding "design" as an explicit category of control, and changing the "fissionable materials" of the original definition into "special nuclear materials," which could include thermonuclear fuels. Despite many years of debates about whether the Restricted Data category was too broad, or whether the "born secret" interpretation of it was prohibitive to peaceful industrial development or even unconstitutional, it was not otherwise fundamentally changed.

In 1969, Congress removed capital punishment as one of the specific penalties imposed by the Atomic Energy Act.

== Categories of Restricted Data ==
Section 142 of the Atomic Energy Act (42 U.S.C. 2162) allows certain nuclear weapons information to be removed from the Restricted Data category to be handled by the Department of Defense or the Intelligence Community.

- Formerly Restricted Data (FRD) is jointly determined by DoD and DOE to relate primarily to the military use of nuclear weapons, and is safeguarded as defense information (e.g., weapon yield, deployment locations, weapons safety and storage, and stockpile quantities).
- Transclassified Foreign Nuclear Information (TFNI) is information from any intelligence source that concerns the nuclear programs of foreign governments that was removed from the RD category by past joint agreements between DOE and the Director of Central Intelligence, or past and future agreements with the Director of National Intelligence.

Critical Nuclear Weapon Design Information (CNWDI) is a category of RD provided to the DoD that reveals the theory of operation or design of components of a thermonuclear or implosion-type fission bomb, warhead, demolition munition, or test device. It is classified as either Secret (S//RD) or Top Secret (TS//RD).

The Sigma categories are subject areas of RD nuclear weapons data related to nuclear weapons, components, or explosive devices or materials that have been determined to require additional protection. The current Sigma categories are Sigma 14, Sigma 15, Sigma 16 and Sigma 20.

== See also ==
- Critical Nuclear Weapon Design Information
- L clearance
- Q clearance
