= L clearance =

U.S. Department of Energy security clearance level

An L clearance is a security clearance used by the United States Department of Energy (DOE) and Nuclear Regulatory Commission for civilian access relating to nuclear materials and information under the Atomic Energy Act of 1954. It is equivalent to a United States Department of Defense (DOD) Secret clearance.

The DOE L clearance provides less access than the agency's Q clearance. L-cleared persons are allowed unescorted access to "limited" and "protected" areas, as well as access to Confidential Restricted Data, Confidential and Secret Formerly Restricted Data, Confidential and Secret National Security Information, and Category III special nuclear material.

As of 1989, the NRC required the Q clearance for employees in the most important and sensitive positions, while most employees in positions deemed "noncritical-sensitive" held L clearances.

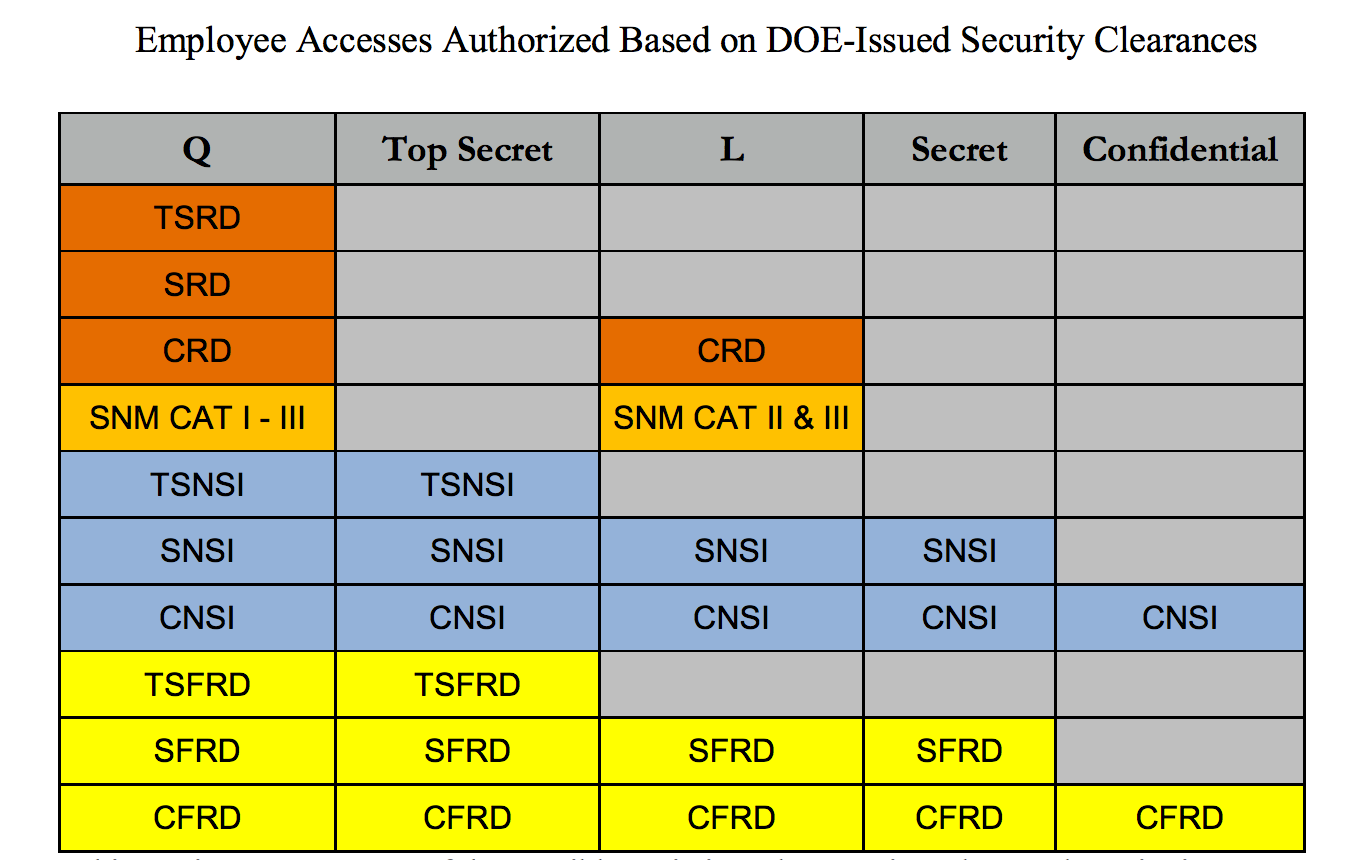
Access authorizations based on clearance level

== See also ==
- Classified information in the United States
