= Critical Nuclear Weapon Design Information =

Category of U.S. top secret classified data

Critical Nuclear Weapon Design Information (CNWDI, often pronounced SIN-widdy or SIN-wuh-dee) is a U.S. Department of Defense (DoD) category of Top Secret Restricted Data or Secret Restricted Data that reveals the theory of operation or design of the components of a thermonuclear or fission bomb, warhead, demolition munition, or test device. Specifically excluded is information concerning arming, fuzing, and firing systems; limited life components; and total contained quantities of fissionable, fusionable, and high explosive materials by type. Among these excluded items are the components that DoD personnel set, maintain, operate, test or replace. The sensitivity of DoD CNWDI is such that access is granted to the absolute minimum number of employees who require it for the accomplishment of assigned responsibilities on a classified contract. Because of the importance of such information, special requirements have been established for its control.

== Markings ==
In addition to other required markings, CNWDI material should be clearly marked, "Critical Nuclear Weapon Design Information-DoD Directive 5210.2 Applies." As a minimum, CNWDI documents shall show such markings on the cover or first page. Portions of documents that contain CNWDI shall be marked with an (N) or (CNWDI) following the classification of the portion. For example, TS(RD)(N) or TS(RD)(CNWDI).

== Weapon Data ==
That portion of Restricted Data or Formerly Restricted Data that concerns the design, manufacture, or utilization (including theory, development, storage, characteristics, performance, and effects) of atomic weapons or atomic weapon components and nuclear explosive devices is called Weapon Data and it has special protection provisions. Weapon Data is divided into eight Sigma categories the protection of which is prescribed by DOE Order 5610.2, CONTROL OF WEAPON DATA. However, certain Weapon Data has been re-categorized as CNWDI.

== See also ==
- Q clearance

== Sources ==
- "National Industrial Security Program Operating Manual (NISPOM) DoD Directive 5220.22-M" (PDF). US DoD DSS. 2006.
