= Steven Aftergood =

Critic of US government secrecy policy

Steven Aftergood is a critic of U.S. government secrecy policy. He directs the Federation of American Scientists project on Government Secrecy and is the author of the Federation publication Secrecy News.

== Life and career ==
Aftergood has a BS in Electrical Engineering from the University of California, Los Angeles and has published research in solid-state physics.

In 1991, Aftergood exposed the classified Project Timberwind, an unacknowledged U.S. Department of Defense special access program to develop a nuclear thermal rocket. That episode led the Federation of American Scientists to initiate an ongoing research project on government secrecy, led by Aftergood.

== Controversies ==
=== Intelligence budget disclosure ===
Aftergood was the plaintiff in a 1997 Freedom of Information Act lawsuit against the Central Intelligence Agency which led to the declassification and publication of the U.S. government's total intelligence budget ($26.6 billion in 1997) for the first time in fifty years.

In 2006, Aftergood won a FOIA lawsuit against the National Reconnaissance Office to release unclassified budget records.

=== Preserving CIA email ===
A Central Intelligence Agency proposal in 2014 to eliminate the email records of all but 22 senior agency officials was derailed after a reference to the move was spotted by Aftergood, triggering a critical reaction in congress and elsewhere. The proposal was formally withdrawn by the agency in 2016.

=== Reducing nuclear weapons secrecy ===
As part of an effort by the Federation of American Scientists to reduce secrecy surrounding nuclear weapons, Aftergood acquired and posted a 2019 Joint Chiefs of Staff publication on Nuclear Operations. The document describes a potential role for such weapons in U.S. warfighting plans.

=== Promoting access to government information ===
Aftergood maintained several widely-used collections of government documents. These include Presidential national security directives, US military doctrinal publications, applications of the state secrets privilege, uses of the Invention Secrecy Act, Congressional Research Service reports, and studies performed by the JASON science advisory panel.

== Awards ==
Aftergood’s work on government secrecy policy has been recognized with the Pioneer Award from the Electronic Frontier Foundation, the James Madison Award from the American Library Association, the Public Access to Government Information Award from the American Association of Law Libraries, and the Hugh M. Hefner First Amendment Award from the Playboy Foundation.

== Selected publications ==
- "Making Up My Mind, and Then Changing It", H-DIPLO series on Learning the Scholar's Craft, (2021), 13 July 2021
- "An Inquiry Into The Dynamics Of Government Secrecy", Harvard Civil Rights-Civil Liberties Law Review, 48:2 (2013) (PDF)
- "Reducing Government Secrecy: Finding What Works", Yale Law and Policy Review, 27: 399-416 (2009) (PDF)
- "'Ethics: Taming our technologies' (review), Nature, 536: 271-272 (2016)", Nature, 536 (7616): 271–272, doi:10.1038/536271a
