= Security clearance =

Permission to access restricted information

A security clearance is a status granted to individuals that allows access to classified information (state or organizational secrets) or to restricted areas, after a thorough background check. The term "security clearance" is also sometimes used in private organizations that have a formal process to vet employees for access to sensitive information. A clearance by itself is normally not sufficient to gain access; the organization must also determine that the cleared individual needs to know specific information. No individual should be granted automatic access to classified information solely because of rank, position, or a security clearance.

== Canada ==
A Canada security clearance is required for viewing classified information in Canada.

== United Kingdom ==
=== National Security Clearance types ===
National Security Clearances are a hierarchy of levels, depending on the classification of materials that can be accessed—Baseline Personnel Security Standard (BPSS), Counter-Terrorist Check (CTC), Enhanced Baseline Standard (EBS), Security Check (SC), enhanced Security Check (eSC), Developed Vetting (DV), enhanced Developed Vetting (eDV), and STRAP.

The BPSS is the entry-level National Security Clearance, and both CTC and EBS are effectively enhancements to the BPSS, with CTC relating to checking for susceptibility to extremist persuasion, and EBS relating to checking for susceptibility to espionage persuasion, the latter being needed for supervised access to SECRET material. The SC again is focused on susceptibility to espionage persuasion, and is required for an individual to have long-term unsupervised access to SECRET material and occasional access to TOP SECRET (TS) material, whilst for regular access to TS the DV, eDV is required. Occasionally STRAP is required with DV.

Those with National Security Clearance are commonly required to sign a statement to the effect that they agree to abide by the restrictions of the Official Secrets Act (OSA). This is popularly referred to as "signing the Official Secrets Act". Signing this has no effect on which actions are legal, as the act is a law, not a contract, and individuals are bound by it whether or not they have signed it. Signing it is intended more as a reminder to the person that they are under such obligations. To this end, it is common to sign this statement both before and after a period of employment that involves access to secrets.

=== National Security Clearance history ===
After the United States entered into World War II, Britain changed its security classifications to match those of the U.S.. Previously, classifications had included the top classification "Most Secret", but it soon became apparent that the United States did not fully understand the UK's classifications, and classified information appeared in the U.S.'s press. This spearheaded the uniformity in classification between the United Kingdom and the United States. The terminology and levels of British security classifications have also changed from Positive Vetting and Enhanced Positive Vetting to SC, eSC, DV, eDV and STRAP.

=== Other UK clearances ===
In addition to National Security Clearances, other types of roles and organisations stipulate a need for clearances, including:

- Vulnerable Group Access (including children), as operated by the Disclosure and Barring Service (DBS), replacing former Criminal Records Bureau (CRB) and Independent Safeguarding Authority (ISA) checks
- Law Enforcement, with a hierarchy of Police Personnel Vetting (PPV) and Non-Police Personnel Vetting (NPPV) levels.

== United States ==
A United States security clearance is an official determination that an individual may access information classified by the United States Government. Security clearances are hierarchical; each level grants the holder access to information in that level and the levels below it.

The US president can declassify previously classified information, following a detailed process.

== United Nations ==
The UN has a Security Clearance (SC) procedure and document for United Nations staff travelling to areas designated as security phase areas, with numbers ranging from one to five ("no-phase" areas are calm countries where no SC is required).

United Nations staff can apply for SC online, at the website of the Department for Safety and Security.

to get a SC in Travel Request Information Process(TRIP) one needs to provide their; name, nationality, United Nations laissez-passer (UNLP) or national passport number issue and expiry date, organization, travel purpose, dates of the mission and where they are staying while on duty

the United nations secretary general delegates to a designated official(DO), who has the authority to make security related decisions and actions, it is the designated official responsibility to manage and issue SC for external and internal travel

== Individuals who have had security clearances revoked ==
In the post World War II era, there have been several highly publicized, and often controversial, cases of officials or scientists having their security clearances revoked, including:

Name	Reason	Year of revocation
Sandy Berger	Mishandling of classified documents	2005
Joe Biden	Trump's rival	2025
Rod Blagojevich	Corruption charges	2008
John O. Brennan	Claimed but not processed	N/A
Hillary Clinton	Trump's rival	2025
John M. Deutch	Mishandling of classified information	1999
Thomas Andrews Drake	Unauthorized disclosure of secrets	2010
Abdel-Moniem El-Ganayni	Unknown reasons	2008
Michael T. Flynn	Lying to the FBI	2017
Kamala Harris	Trump's rival	2025
Wen Ho Lee	Espionage charges	1999
Robert Oppenheimer	Communist sympathies	1954
Aldric Saucier	Whistleblowing on fraud	1992
Edward Snowden	Unauthorized disclosure of secrets	2013
Alan Turing (UK)	Homosexuality conviction	1952
Qian Xuesen	Communist sympathies	1950

This list does not cover people whose security clearance lapsed possibly following changing their job.

== See also ==
- List of U.S. security clearance terms
- List of established military terms
- List of government and military acronyms
- Security Advisory Opinion
