= Atomic Energy Act of 1946 =

US law on the control and management of nuclear technology

- Long title: An Act For the development and control of atomic energy
- Enacted by: the 79th United States Congress

Citations
- Public law: Pub. L. 79–585
- Statutes at Large: ch. 724, 60 Stat. 755

Legislative history
- Introduced in the Senate as S. 1717 by Brien McMahon (D-CT) on December 20, 1945; Passed the Senate on June 1, 1946 (unanimous consent); Passed the House on July 20, 1946 (265–79); Signed into law by President Harry S. Truman on August 1, 1946

Major amendments
- Atomic Energy Act of 1954

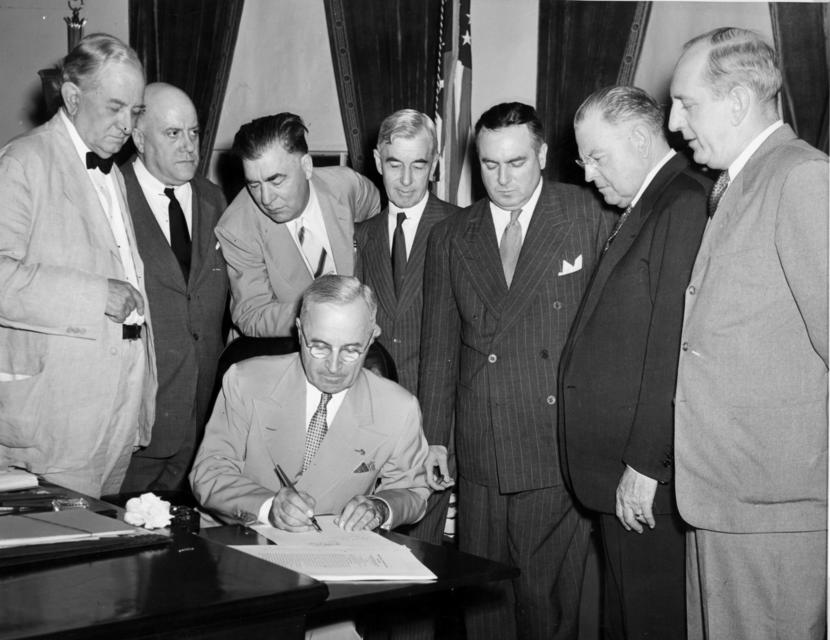
President Harry S. Truman signs the Atomic Energy Act into law on August 1, 1946. Behind the President, left to right, are Senators Tom Connally, Eugene D. Millikin, Edwin C. Johnson, Thomas C. Hart, Brien McMahon, Warren R. Austin and Richard B. Russell Jr.

The Atomic Energy Act of 1946 (McMahon Act) determined how the United States would control and manage the nuclear technology it had jointly developed with its World War II allies, the United Kingdom and Canada. Most significantly, the Act ruled that nuclear weapon development and nuclear power management would be under civilian, rather than military control, and established the United States Atomic Energy Commission for this purpose.

It was sponsored by Senator Brien McMahon, a Democrat from Connecticut, who chaired the United States Senate Special Committee on Atomic Energy, and whose hearings in late 1945 and early 1946 led to the fine tuning and passing of the Act. The Senate passed the Act unanimously through voice vote, and it passed the House of Representatives 265–79. Signed into law by President Harry S. Truman on August 1, 1946, it went into effect on January 1, 1947, and the Atomic Energy Commission assumed responsibility for nuclear energy from the wartime Manhattan Project.

The Act was subsequently amended to promote private development of nuclear energy under the Eisenhower administration's Atoms for Peace program in 1954. In restricting the access to nuclear information to other countries, it created a rift between the United States and its allies, particularly Britain and Canada, which had participated in the Manhattan Project. This resulted in cumbersome command and control arrangements, and in Britain developing its own nuclear weapons. The Act was amended in 1958 to allow the United States to share information with its close allies.

== Origins ==
Nuclear weapons were developed during World War II by the wartime Manhattan Project. Key scientists working on the project anticipated that their development would have wide-ranging implications. However the project director, Major General Leslie R. Groves Jr., was reluctant to spend project funds on activities beyond those required to win the war. Nonetheless, Arthur Compton of the Metallurgical Project in Chicago commissioned a report on post-war nuclear energy, and the Military Policy Committee, the Manhattan Project's governing body, commissioned a similar study by Richard Tolman. Both reports called for a comprehensive, government-supported nuclear energy program, with military, scientific, and industrial aspects.

In July 1944, Vannevar Bush, James B. Conant and Irvin Stewart produced a proposal for domestic legislation to control nuclear energy. Conant submitted this to the Secretary of War Henry L. Stimson in September 1944, and then to the Interim Committee, a body created by President Harry S. Truman in May 1945 to supervise, regulate and control nuclear energy until such a time as Congress created a permanent body to do so. In June 1945, the Interim Committee asked George L. Harrison, an assistant to Stimson and a member of the committee, to prepare legislation.

== Creation of the Act ==
=== May–Johnson Bill ===
Harrison brought in two experienced Harvard Law School-educated War Department lawyers, Brigadier General Kenneth Royall and William L. Marbury Jr., to take up the job of drafting the legislation. The legislation was based on Bush and Conant's proposal, and the organization that it proposed was based on the existing structure of the Manhattan Project. Their draft bill would have created a nine-person commission consisting of five civilian and four military members. It granted the commission broad powers to acquire property, operate facilities, conduct research, regulate all forms of nuclear energy, and administer its own security, administrative and audit regimes.

Royall and Marbury envisaged nuclear energy being controlled by experts, with a minimum of political interference. The commissioners would be appointed for indefinite terms, and the President's power to remove them would be limited. They would be supported by four advisory boards, for military applications, industrial uses, research and medicine, the membership of which would be restricted to those with technical qualifications. Day-to-day running of the organization would be in the hands of an administrator and his deputy. The Royall–Marbury Bill was reviewed by the Interim Committee at its July 19 meeting and revised in line with their suggestions. After the atomic bombings of Hiroshima and Nagasaki lifted the veil of secrecy surrounding the Manhattan Project, Royall and Marbury were able to consult with the Attorney General, the Judge Advocate General and the Office of Scientific Research and Development. The draft was sent to the President in August for circulation among, and comment from, affected government agencies. Only the State Department had objections, on the basis that it was still involved in trying to hammer out an international agreement on nuclear energy.

On October 3, 1945, the bill was introduced in the House of Representatives by Congressman Andrew J. May from Kentucky, the chairman of the House Military Affairs Committee, and in the Senate by Senator Edwin C. Johnson from Colorado, the ranking member of the Senate Military Affairs Committee. The bill was known as the May-Johnson Bill for its sponsors. May immediately had the bill referred to the Military Affairs Committee, which held hearings on October 9. Bush, Conant and Groves all testified before the committee. But in the Senate Military Affairs Committee, the bill was held up by Senator Arthur H. Vandenberg.

There was a storm of criticism from scientists, particularly those at the Metallurgical Laboratory in Chicago. Leó Szilárd and Harold Urey were particularly notable critics. The bill created a powerful administrator and deputy administrator, and specifically stated that they might be members of the armed forces. It was feared that they would dominate the part-time commissioners. The fact that the bill emphasized that the administrator had to keep the deputy fully informed further aroused suspicion that the administrator would be an Army officer and the deputy a Navy officer. The secrecy provisions also frightened many scientists; it contained severe penalties of up to ten years imprisonment and $10,000 in fines for security breaches. The Chicago Sun headline accused the War Department of attempting to railroad the legislation through Congress.

Legislators found themselves in an unusual and uncomfortable situation. Nuclear weapons were terrifying, and the nature of nuclear energy was not widely understood. Because it was so new, there were no policies or precedents to guide legislators, and traditional party alignments were absent. The scientists who had developed the new technology had never been vocal before, but suddenly were now. The victorious conclusion of World War II gave the armed forces enormous prestige, but there still remained the long-standing American distrust of standing armies, and the tradition of civilian control of the military.

=== McMahon Bill ===
On December 20, 1945, Senator Brien McMahon introduced an alternative bill on atomic energy, drafted by the Senate Military Affairs Committee, which quickly became known as the McMahon Bill. This was initially a very liberal bill regarding the control of scientific research, and was broadly supported by scientists. McMahon framed the controversy as a question of military versus civilian control of atomic energy, although the May-Johnson Bill also provided for civilian control. The McMahon Bill attempted to address the controversial aspects of the May-Johnson Bill. The number of commissioners was reduced to five, and they would serve full-time. No exemption was provided for serving military officers. An amendment specified that they have staggered terms of five years.

While the bill was being debated, the news broke on February 16, 1946, of the defection of Igor Gouzenko in Canada, and the subsequent arrest of 22 people. The members of Congress debating the bill feared that "atomic secrets" were being systematically stolen by Soviet atomic spies. McMahon convened an executive session at which Federal Bureau of Investigation Director J. Edgar Hoover, Secretary of State James F. Byrnes and Groves were called to appear. Groves revealed that the British physicist Alan Nunn May had passed information about the Manhattan Project to Soviet agents.

The more conservative elements in Congress now moved to toughen the act. Section 10, which was formerly titled "Dissemination of Information", now became "Control of Information". This new section contained the novel doctrine later described as "born secret" or "classified at birth". All information concerning the design, development and manufacture of nuclear weapons was "restricted data", and regardless of how it was derived or obtained, was considered classified unless it was specifically declassified. This restriction on free speech, covering an entire subject matter, is still enforced. The "wall of secrecy" set up by the Act meant that atomic energy research and development had to be conducted under the supervision of the Atomic Energy Commission.

Representative Helen Gahagan Douglas, who sponsored the McMahon Bill in the House, vigorously defended the dissemination provisions of Section 10 against counterarguments. She dismissed objections that it would "give away the secret of the bomb", asserting that America's advantage in nuclear weapons could only be temporary, whereas the bill could perpetuate its lead in scientific research. An important addition, known as the Vandenberg Amendment, created a Military Liaison Committee to advise the commission on defense matters. Section 2 of the Act also created a General Advisory Committee, and a new Joint Committee on Atomic Energy to oversee the new organization.

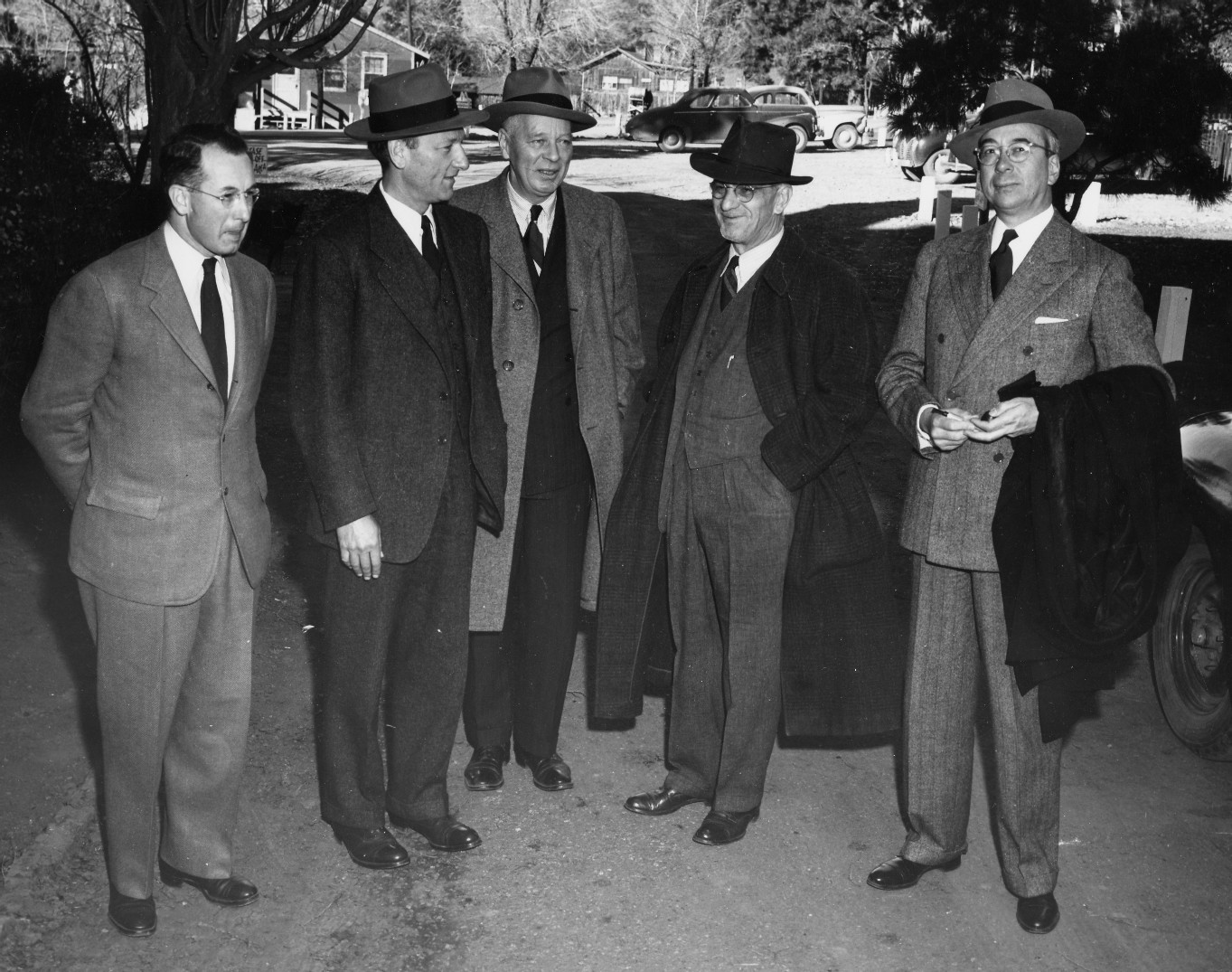
The first five Atomic Energy Commissioners. Left to right: Robert Bacher, David E. Lilienthal, Sumner Pike, William W. Waymack and Lewis L. Strauss

The Senate passed the Act unanimously through voice vote on June 1, 1946. Considerable political maneuvering was required before it was passed by the House 265–79 on July 20. A compromise bill was then agreed to by both houses on July 26. Truman signed the compromise bill into law as the Atomic Energy Act of 1946 on August 1, 1946. When it went into effect at midnight on January 1, 1947, the newly created Atomic Energy Commission assumed responsibility for nuclear energy from the wartime Manhattan Project.

== Amendment ==
=== Private production of nuclear energy ===
An important omission from the Atomic Energy Act of 1946 was any mention of non-governmental use of nuclear energy, since military applications overshadowed all others at the time. The restrictions of the act related to secrecy, the control of fissile materials, the ownership of patents and the operation of production facilities placed a number of legal roadblocks in the way of private nuclear power stations.

This was at odds with the Eisenhower administration's Atoms for Peace program, and resulted in pressure on federal officials to develop a civilian nuclear power industry that could help justify the government's considerable expenditures on the nuclear weapons program. In 1953, the Atomic Energy Commission presented a set of draft amendments to the Joint Committee on Atomic Energy for consideration. After some debate, this resulted in the Atomic Energy Act of 1954.

The Atomic Energy Act of 1954 proved insufficient in its objective of encouraging privately built and run nuclear reactors. A series of accidents with research reactors, including partial core meltdowns, made private companies cautious, and reluctant to become involved with nuclear energy without protection from liability. This led to the Price–Anderson Nuclear Industries Indemnity Act of 1957, which capped private liability for nuclear accidents, while providing for adequate compensations for accident victims.

=== International relations ===
Implementing the McMahon Act created a substantial rift between United States and Britain. The new control of "restricted data" prevented the United States' allies from receiving any information, despite the fact that the British and Canadian governments, before contributing technology and manpower to the Manhattan Project, had made agreements with the United States about the post-war sharing of nuclear technology. Those agreements had been formalized in the 1943 Quebec Agreement. In the case of the United Kingdom, these were developed further in the 1944 Hyde Park Agreement, which was signed by Winston Churchill and Franklin Roosevelt.

The Hyde Park Agreement was lost in Roosevelt's papers after his death, and until the American copy of the document was found American officials were puzzled when the British mentioned it. The Quebec Agreement was an executive agreement that only applied to the Roosevelt administration, and the Senate had not seen the document. McMahon told Churchill in 1952 that "If we had seen this Agreement, there would have been no McMahon Act." The McMahon Act fueled resentment from British scientists and Churchill and led to Britain developing its own nuclear weapons.

Lewis Strauss, the Chairman of the Atomic Energy Commission, proposed in January 1958 that the President should be able to share nuclear information with allies that were making "substantial and material contributions to the national defense and security". In addition to its own nuclear weapons, Britain had hosted American Strategic Air Command nuclear bombers since 1948. Congress amended the Atomic Energy Act of 1954 in June 1958, and America and Britain again began sharing nuclear research under the 1958 US–UK Mutual Defence Agreement.

The stipulations contained in the Act caused significant controversy during debates over NATO's military command structure. Both Striking Fleet Atlantic and the United States Sixth Fleet have never been allowed to be placed anywhere but directly under American commanding officers—the Supreme Allied Commander Atlantic and Commander-in-Chief, Allied Forces Southern Europe—because the dominant legal interpretation of the McMahon Act has been that nuclear striking forces cannot be controlled by non-US commanders. This was the reason for the formation of Striking Fleet Atlantic as an independent entity, instead of being operationally subordinated to the UK Admiral serving as Commander-in-Chief, Eastern Atlantic, in October–November 1952. This was also the reason why the Sixth Fleet, in its NATO guise as Naval Striking and Support Force, South, was placed under American control rather than Allied Forces Mediterranean when the European commands were agreed at the same time.

== Case law ==
A 2012 court decision concerning a state law attempting to shut down the Vermont Yankee Nuclear Power Plant affirmed that the Act gives the federal government exclusive authority over safety at nuclear power plants. This allowed Vermont Yankee to continue operating until it was voluntarily shut down by the owner for economic reasons in 2014.

== See also ==
- Born secret
- Invention Secrecy Act
