= Atomic Energy Act of 1954 =

United States federal law that covers nuclear materials and facilities

- Long title: An Act to amend the Atomic Energy Act of 1946, as amended, and for other purposes.
- Enacted by: the 83rd United States Congress
- Effective: August 30, 1954

Citations
- Public law: 83-703
- Statutes at Large: 68 Stat. 919

Codification
- Acts amended: Atomic Energy Act of 1946
- Titles amended: 42 U.S.C.: Public Health and Social Welfare
- U.S.C. sections amended: 42 U.S.C. ch. 23

Legislative history
- Introduced in the House as H.R. 9757 by William S. Cole (R-NY) on June 30, 1954; Passed the House on July 26, 1954 (231–154); Passed the Senate on July 27, 1954 (57–28, in lieu of S. 3690); Reported by the joint conference committee on August ?, 1954; agreed to by the Senate on August 17, 1954 (59–17) and by the House on August ?, 1954 (without recorded vote); Signed into law by President Dwight D. Eisenhower on August 30, 1954

United States Supreme Court cases
- Power Reactor Co. v. Electricians, 367 U.S. 396 (1961); Train v. Colorado Public Interest Research Group, Inc., 426 U.S. 1 (1976); Pacific Gas & Elec. Co. v. State Energy Resources Conservation and Development Comm'n, 461 U.S. 190 (1983); Silkwood v. Kerr-McGee Corp., 464 U.S. 238 (1984); Huffman v. Western Nuclear, Inc., 486 U.S. 663 (1988); English v. General Elec. Co., 496 U.S. 72 (1990); Virginia Uranium, Inc. v. Warren, No. 16-1275, 587 U.S. ___ (2019)

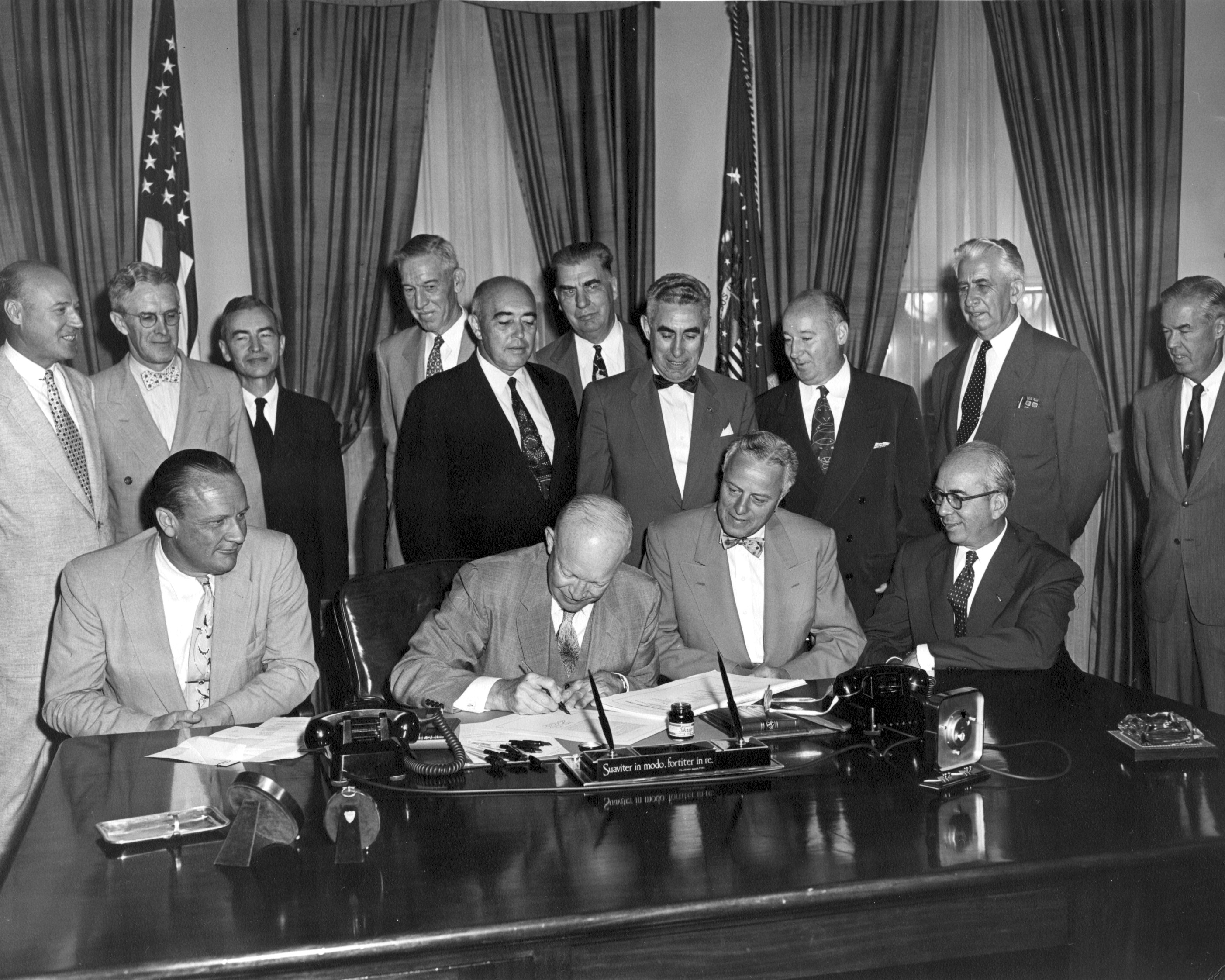
President Eisenhower signs the bill in an official signing ceremony.

The Atomic Energy Act of 1954, 42 U.S.C. §§ 2011–2021, 2022-2286i, 2296a-2297h-13, is a United States federal law that covers for the development, regulation, and disposal of nuclear materials and facilities in the United States.

It was an amendment to the Atomic Energy Act of 1946 and substantially refined certain aspects of the law, including increased support for the possibility of a civilian nuclear industry. Notably, it made it possible for the government to allow private companies to gain technical information (Restricted Data) about nuclear energy production and the production of fissile materials, allowing for greater exchange of information with foreign nations as part of President Dwight D. Eisenhower's Atoms for Peace program, and reversed certain provisions in the 1946 law which had made it impossible to patent processes for generating nuclear energy or fissile materials.

The H.R. 9757 legislation was passed by the 83rd U.S. Congressional session and signed into law by President Dwight Eisenhower on August 30, 1954.

The Nuclear Regulatory Commission described the Atomic Energy Act as, "the fundamental U.S. law on both the civilian and the military uses of nuclear materials."

== See also ==
- Arms Control and Disarmament Act of 1961
- Atomic Energy Act
- United States energy law
- Bourke B. Hickenlooper
- Nuclear Non-Proliferation Act of 1978
