= Public Interest Declassification Board =

Logo of the United States Public Interest Declassification Board

The Public Interest Declassification Board (PIDB) is an advisory committee established by the United States Congress with the official mandate of promoting the fullest possible public access to a thorough, accurate, and reliable documentary record of significant U.S. national security decisions and activities. The Board is composed of nine individuals: five appointed by the President of the United States and one each appointed by the Speaker of the House, House Minority Leader, Senate Majority Leader, and Senate Minority Leader. Appointees must be U.S. citizens preeminent in the fields of history, national security, foreign policy, intelligence policy, social science, law, or archives.

Established by the Public Interest Declassification Act of 2000 (Title VII of P.L. 106–567, 114 Stat. 2856), the board advises the President of the United States regarding issues pertaining to national classification and declassification policy. Section 1102 of the Intelligence Reform and Terrorism Prevention Act of 2004 extended and modified the Board.

The director of the Information Security Oversight Office (ISOO) serves as the executive secretary of the PIDB, and ISOO staff provides support on a reimbursable basis. In December 2020, President Donald Trump appointed Acting Under Secretary of Defense for Intelligence Ezra Cohen to chair the Public Interest Declassification Board.

== Functions ==
- Advises the President and other executive branch officials on the systematic, thorough, coordinated, and comprehensive identification, collection, review for declassification, and release of declassified records and materials that are of archival value, including records and materials of extraordinary public interest.
- Promotes public access to thorough, accurate, and reliable documentary records of significant U.S. national security decisions and significant U.S. national security activities in order to: support the oversight and legislative functions of Congress; support the policymaking role of the executive branch; respond to the interest of the public in national security matters; and promote reliable historical analysis and new avenues of historical study in national security matters.
- Provides recommendations to the President for the identification, collection, and review for declassification of information of public interest that would not undermine U.S. national security
- Advises executive branch officials on policies deriving from Executive orders regarding the classification and declassification of national security information.
- Makes recommendations to the President regarding congressional committee requests to declassify certain records or to reconsider a declination to declassify specific records.

== Board members ==
=== Presidential Appointees ===
- Paul-Noel Chretien - Appointed to a three-year term by Donald Trump on December 30, 2020. Mr Chretien has a B.A. in economics from Virginia Tech and a J.D. from George Washington University Law School. After time in private practice in Washington D.C., he joined the U.S. Department of Justice, practicing Freedom of Information Act (United States) and Privacy Act of 1974 law. From 2000 until 2019, Mr. Chretien worked at the Central Intelligence Agency, where he held a variety of positions, including Chairman of the Publications Review Board and Liaison Representative to the Interagency Security Classification Appeals Panel (ISCAP) at the National Archives. In his role as Liaison Representative, Mr. Chretien was responsible for justifying either the declassification of CIA documents or their continued classification to protect national security. Mr. Chretien retired from the CIA in 2019 and is now a management consultant and technical writer at Leidos.
- Ezra Cohen; - Appointed to a three-year term by Donald Trump on January 11, 2021. Mr Cohen was designated chair for two years on the same date. He has a B.A. in history from the University of Pennsylvania. He has been Acting Under Secretary of Defense for Intelligence and Security, Director for Defense Intelligence and Acting Assistant Secretary of Defense for Special Operations and Low-Intensity Conflict among other government positions.
- Laura A. DeBonis - Appointed to a shorter term that will end December 29, 2023 by Joseph Biden on November 30, 2021. She has a B.A. and an M.B.A from Harvard College and Harvard Business School respectively. Ms. DeBonis previously served on the Board from 2015 to 2018 as an appointee of President Barack Obama. Her professional experience include several positions at Google and as a consultant to start ups and non profits. Ms. DeBonis is an emerita trustee for the WGBH Educational Foundation in Boston and has also served as a trustee of the Boston Public Library.
- Michael G. Lawrence - Appointed to a three-year term by Donald Trump on October 9, 2020. He has a B.S. in Criminal Justice from John Jay College and attended Western Michigan Law School. Before retiring in 2019, he worked in the Intelligence Community in roles such as the Director of the Enterprise Functional Team at the National Security Agency, Senior Advisor to the Director of National Intelligence, National Security Agency Chair at the National Defense University at Ft. McNair, Director in the Office of Strategic Communications, Business Plans, and Operations at the National Reconnaissance Office, and Principal Director for Legislative Affairs at the NSA.
- Benjamin A. Powell - Appointed to a three-year term by Donald Trump on October 9, 2020. He has degrees in and finance and a J.D. from Columbia Law School. Prior to law school, he was an officer in the Air Force supporting the intelligence missions of United States Space Command Joint Space Intelligence Center, Fleet Intelligence Centers, National Maritime Intelligence Center and more and worked for the Federal Bureau of Investigation. Mr. Powell clerked on the United States Supreme Court for Justices John Paul Stevens and Byron White, and the United States Court of Appeals for the Second Circuit for Judge John M. Walker, Jr. He was White House representative to the President's Commission on the Intelligence Capabilities of the United States Regarding Weapons of Mass Destruction, Special Assistant to the President and Associate White House Counsel from 2002 to 2006 and General Counsel of the Office of the Director of National Intelligence.

=== Congressional Appointees ===
- Carter Burwell - Appointed to a three-year term by Senate Minority Leader Mitch McConnell beginning February 15, 2022. Mr. Burwell received his J.D. from the University of Virginia School of Law, an MPhil from the University of Cambridge, and a B.A. from Columbia University. He was a law clerk for John Gleeson, U.S. District Judge for the Eastern District of New York, and for Karen Henderson on the U.S. Court of Appeals for the D.C. Circuit. He was then a counter-terrorism prosecutor at the Department of Justice. He has also been Chief Counsel to U.S. Senator John Cornyn, Counsel to U.S. Senator Chuck Grassley and Counselor to the Secretary of the Treasury for Terrorism and Financial Intelligence.
- Harold W. ("Trey") Gowdy - Appointed to a three-year term by House Minority Leader Kevin McCarthy beginning August 24, 2020. Mr. Gowdy holds a B.A. in history from Baylor University and a J.D. from the University of South Carolina. He was a prosecutor in South Carolina for 16 years. Mr. Gowdy served four terms in the U.S. House of Representatives from South Carolina's 4th congressional district from 2011 to 2019. Rep. Gowdy's committee assignments included the House Judiciary Committee and the House Permanent Select Committee on Intelligence. He chaired the Oversight and Government Reform Committee and the United States House Select Committee on Benghazi.
- Alissa M. Starzak - Appointed by Senate Majority Leader Charles E. Schumer for a three-year term beginning on February 15, 2022. She serves as vice chair of the board, as elected by the members. She graduated from Amherst College and the University of Chicago Law School, where she served as an editor of the University of Chicago Law Review. She clerked for E. Grady Jolly, U.S. Court of Appeals for the Fifth Circuit. Ms. Starzak served as counsel to the U.S. Senate Select Committee on Intelligence, Assistant General Counsel at the Central Intelligence Agency’s Office of General Counsel, Deputy General Counsel for Legislation at the U.S. Department of Defense, and the 21st General Counsel of the U.S. Department of the Army.
- John F. Tierney - Appointed by House Speaker Nancy Pelosi for a three-year term beginning on July 1, 2020. He holds a B.A. from Salem State College and J.D. from Suffolk University Law School. Mr. Tierney is a former nine-term Massachusetts Congressman who served on the House Intelligence Committee and chaired the National Security and Foreign Affairs Subcommittee of the Government Oversight and Reform Committee.

== Previous Board Members ==
- Martin Faga - Appointed to a four-year term by President George W. Bush in October 2004 and reappointed for a three-year term in January 2009. In 2005, he was appointed to the President's Foreign Intelligence Advisory Board. Faga was president and chief executive officer of the Mitre Corporation from 2000 to 2006 and is currently a member of its board of trustees. Before joining Mitre, Faga served from 1989 until 1993 as Assistant Secretary of the Air Force for Space with primary emphasis on policy, strategy, and planning. At the same time, he served as Director of the National Reconnaissance Office (NRO). Faga's career included service as a staff member of the House Permanent Select Committee on Intelligence, where he headed the program and budget staff; as an engineer at the Central Intelligence Agency; and as a research and development officer in the Air Force. Faga received bachelor's and master's degrees in electrical engineering from Lehigh University in 1963 and 1964.
- Herbert O. Briick - Appointed to a three-year term by President George W. Bush in October 2008. Briick is currently a senior analyst for a subsidiary of General Dynamics. Briick retired from the Central Intelligence Agency in January 2008, following a 33-year career which included service in every directorate of the Agency. For the last five years of his career he was responsible for the management of the CIA declassification program. In that capacity he took part in a wide variety of declassification issues involving the National Security Council, the National Archives and Records Administration, the presidential libraries, the Office of the Historian in the Department of State, other members of the Intelligence Community, the Congress, and non-governmental organizations. He promoted a number of successful initiatives to release previously classified National Intelligence Estimates and other CIA records of historic significance. Briick was awarded the Career Intelligence Medal in recognition of his service to the CIA. Briick graduated from the University of Notre Dame in 1973 with a Bachelor of Arts in history and received his Master of Arts in Law and Diplomacy in international security studies from the Fletcher School of Law and Diplomacy at Tufts University in 1975.
- Elizabeth Rindskopf Parker - Appointed to a three-year term by President George W. Bush in October 2004 and reappointed for 3 years on October 23, 2008. She joined McGeorge School of Law as its eighth dean in 2002 from her position as general counsel for the University of Wisconsin System. Previously, she served as general counsel for the CIA; Principal Deputy Legal Adviser, U.S. Department of State; general counsel, National Security Agency; and as Acting Assistant Director (Mergers and Acquisitions) at the Federal Trade Commission. Parker also served as the director of the New Haven Legal Assistance Association. Early in her career, Parker gained significant experience in the federal courts with a variety of litigation involving discrimination and civil liberties issues, including two successful oral arguments before the Supreme Court of the United States and numerous arguments before various courts of appeal. Parker graduated cum laude from the University of Michigan in 1965 and received her J.D. from the University of Michigan Law School in 1968.
- Jennifer Sims - Appointed to a three-year term by President George W. Bush in December 2008. Sims is visiting professor in the Security Studies Program and Director of Intelligence Studies at Georgetown University. Prior to this, she taught as a professorial lecturer at School of Advanced International Studies at Johns Hopkins University. Sims served as Senior Intelligence Advisor to the Under Secretary of State for Management from December 1998 to May 2001 and as Deputy Assistant Secretary for Intelligence Policy and Coordination in the Bureau of Intelligence and Research from 1994 to 1998. From November 1990 to April 1994, she served as a professional staff member on the Senate Select Committee on Intelligence and as foreign affairs and defense advisor to Senator John Danforth. In 1998, Sims received the National Intelligence Distinguished Service Medal for her work on developing intelligence support for diplomatic operations. She has written extensively on nuclear arms control and intelligence, including Icarus Restrained: An Intellectual History of American Arms Control, 1945-1960 (Westview Press, 1991) and, most recently, co-edited volumes with Burton Gerber, Transforming US Intelligence (Georgetown University Press, 2005) and Vaults Mirrors and Masks: Problems in US Counterintelligence Policy (Georgetown University Press, 2008). Sims received her Bachelor of Arts from Oberlin College and her Master of Arts (1978) and Ph.D (1985) from the School of Advanced International Studies at Johns Hopkins University.
- David E. Skaggs - David Skaggs was appointed to the PIDB for a 2-year term by the Minority Leader of the U.S. House of Representatives in January 2005. He was reappointed for a second term in July 2007, and then reappointed for a third term in June 2009. He is chairman of the board of the Office of Congressional Ethics and the former executive director of the Colorado Department of Higher Education (2007-2009). He served 12 years in Congress (1987–1999) as the Representative from the 2nd Congressional District in Colorado, including 8 years on the House Appropriations Committee and 6 years on the House Permanent Select Committee on Intelligence, where he devoted particular attention to classification and information security issues. After leaving Congress, he was the founding executive director of the Center for Democracy and Citizenship at the Council for Excellence in Government (1999-2006), counsel to a Washington, DC–based law firm, and 3 years as an adjunct professor at the University of Colorado. Mr. Skaggs was a Colorado State Representative (1981–1987), including two terms as Minority Leader, and was chief of staff for Congressman Timothy E. Wirth of Colorado from 1974 to 1977. Before serving in elected office, Mr. Skaggs practiced law in Boulder, CO; as a judge advocate in the United States Marine Corps; and briefly in New York City. He has a B.A. in philosophy from Wesleyan University (1964) and an LL.B from Yale Law School (1967).
- William O. (Bill) Studeman - Appointed to a three-year term by Speaker of the House Dennis Hastert in June 2006, and reappointed for three-year term in June 2009. Studeman is a retired United States Navy admiral. He is a distinguished graduate of both the Naval War College and National War College and as a restricted line naval intelligence officer, his flag tours included Director of Long Range Navy Planning in the Office of the Chief of Naval Operations, director of the National Security Agency, and Deputy Director of Central Intelligence (DDCI) with two extended periods as acting Director of Central Intelligence (DCI). As DDCI, he served in both the George H. W. Bush and Clinton administrations under DCIs Robert Gates, R. James Woolsey, Jr., and John M. Deutch. Studeman retired from the Navy in 1995 after almost 35 years of service and later became vice president of Northrop Grumman and deputy general manager of Mission Systems. He was recently a commissioner on the Presidential Commission on Weapons of Mass Destruction, and is currently serving on the National Science Advisory Board for Biosecurity. He is a member of the Defense Science Board, as well as Defense Intelligence Agency Joint Military Intelligence College, and other advisory boards. Studeman holds a B.A. in history from the Sewanee: The University of the South and an M.A. in public and international affairs from George Washington University, as well as several honorary doctorates.
- Sanford J. Ungar - Appointed to a three-year term by Senate Majority Leader Harry Reid in March 2008. He is the tenth president of Goucher College in Baltimore, Maryland. Ungar obtained his B.A. in government from Harvard College and a master's degree in international history from the London School of Economics. In May 1999 he was awarded an honorary Doctorate of Humane Letters by Wilkes University in his hometown of Wilkes-Barre, Pennsylvania. Prior to assuming his position at Goucher, Ungar was Director of the Voice of America for two years. From 1986 until 1999, he was dean of the American University School of Communication. The author of many magazine and newspaper articles on topics of political and international interest, Ungar has spoken frequently around the United States and in other countries on issues of American foreign policy and domestic politics, free expression, human rights, and immigration. Sanford Ungar has been Washington editor of The Atlantic, managing editor of Foreign Policy magazine, and a staff writer for The Washington Post. He was a correspondent for UPI in Paris and for Newsweek in Nairobi, and for many years contributed to The Economist, as well as The New York Times Magazine.

== By-Laws ==
The Board is assigned functions and membership by the Public Interest Declassification Act of 2000 (P.L. 106–567, December 27, 2000) as amended by the Intelligence Reform and Terrorism Prevention Act of 2004, notably section 703.

The U.S. president selects the chairperson from among the members. The members may elect from among the members a Vice Chairperson who fills in when the chairperson is not present.

Meetings of the Board are only official when a quorum is present, which by law is a majority of the members. Such meetings of the board are by law generally open to the public. In those instances where the Board finds it necessary to conduct business at a closed meeting, attendance at meetings of the Board shall be limited to those persons necessary for the Board to fulfill its functions in a complete and timely manner, as determined by the chairperson. The Executive Secretary is responsible for the preparation of each meeting's minutes and the distribution of draft minutes to members. Approved minutes will be maintained among the records of the Board.

Decisions can be made by Board votes at meetings or by the membership outside the context of a formal Board meeting. The Executive Secretary shall record and retain such votes in a documentary form and immediately report the results to the chairperson and other members.

The staff of NARA's Information Security Oversight Office (ISOO) provide program and administrative support for the Board and the office director serves as Executive Secretary to the Board. The Board may seek detailees from its member agencies to augment the staff of the Information Security Oversight Office in support of the Board.

Board records are maintained by the Executive Secretary. Freedom of Information Act requests and other requests for a document that originated within an agency other than the Board are referred to that agency.

Article VIII sets forth the procedures for considering a proper request under the Act from a committee of jurisdiction in the Congress for the Board to make a recommendation to the President regarding the declassification of certain records.

Standards for decision. A recommendation to declassify a record in whole or in part requires a determination by the Board, after careful consideration of the views of the original classifying authority, that declassification is in the public interest. A decision to recommend declassification in whole or in part requires the affirmative vote of a majority of a quorum of the Board, and of no less than four members of the Board, and the vote of each member present shall be recorded. Resolution of Requests. The Board may recommend that the President: (1) take no action pursuant to the request; (2) declassify the record(s) in whole or in part, pursuant to action taken in accordance with paragraph C; or (3) remand the matter to the agency responsible for the record(s) for further consideration and a timely response to the Board. Notification. The chair shall promptly convey to the President, through the Assistant to the President for National Security Affairs and to the agency head responsible for the record(s), the Board's recommendation, including a written justification for its recommendation. The approval and amendment of these bylaws shall require the affirmative vote of at least five of the Board's members. The Executive Secretary shall submit the approved bylaws and their amendments for publication in the Federal Register. Protection of Classified Information. Any classified information contained in the request file shall be handled and protected in accordance with the Order and its implementing directives. Information that is subject to a request for declassification under this section shall remain classified unless and until a final decision is made by the President or by the agency head responsible for the record(s) to declassify it.

Decisions to declassify and release information rest with the President or the agency responsible for the records, not this Board.

The Board reports annually to Congress. Amendments to the Board's bylaws are published in the Federal Register.

== Meetings ==
2009	2008	2007	2006
July 8, 2009	October 31, 2008	June 22, 2007	November 13, 2006
	September 27, 2008	April 27, 2007	October 13, 2006
	March 17, 2008	February 24, 2007	September 9, 2006
		January 19, 2007	July 14, 2006
		December 15, 2006	June 23, 2006
			May 9, 2006
			April 1, 2006
			February 25, 2006

== Declassification Policy Forum ==
On May 27, 2009, President Barack Obama signed a presidential memorandum ordering the review of Executive Order 12958, as amended "Classified National Security Information". The review of the Order is to be completed within 90 days. On June 2, 2009, the National Security Advisor asked the PIDB to assist in this review by soliciting recommendations for revisions to the Order to ensure adequate public input as the review moves forward.

The PIDB was soliciting recommendations via the Declassification Policy Forum, here.

The four topics of discussion were:

- Declassification Policy
- Creation of a National Declassification Center
- Classification Policy
- Technology Challenges and Opportunities

The Forum had a very productive discussion and received more than 150 thoughtful comments from members of the public. The Public Interest Declassification Board has sent a letter and a summary of the comments to the National Security Advisor.

It ran from June 29 through July 19, 2009.

== Reports ==
- "Improving Declassification" (2007)
- "Transforming the Security Classification System" (November 2012)
- "Setting Priorities: An Essential Step in Transforming Declassification" (December 2014)

== See also ==
- Classified information in the United States
- Controlled Unclassified Information
- Interagency Security Classification Appeals Panel
