= Brian Patrick Regan =

American convicted spy

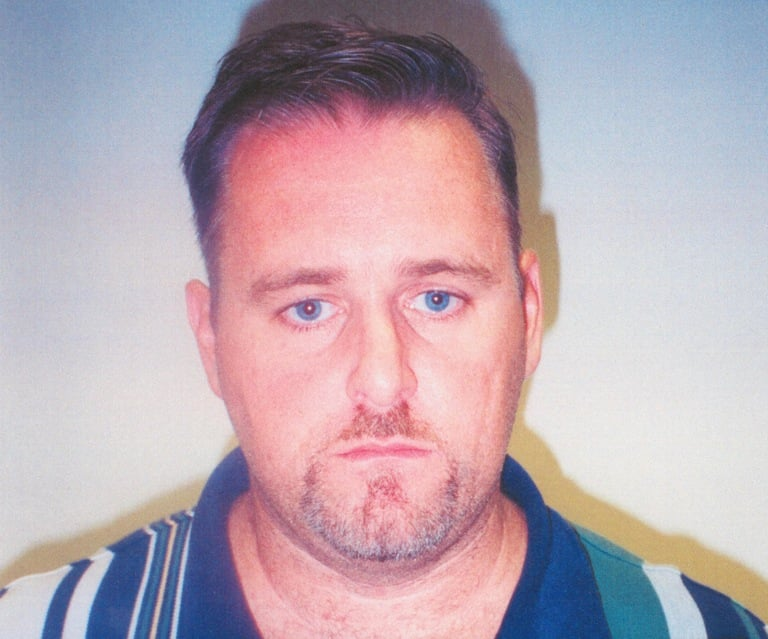
- Regan just after his arrest in 2001.
- Born: October 23, 1962 (age 63); Queens, New York City, New York
- Years active: mid-1999–August 23, 2001
- Employer(s): National Reconnaissance Office; TRW Inc.
- Spouse: Anette Stenqvist
- Children: 4
- Motive: Money
- Convictions: 2x Attempted espionage 1x Unlawful retention of national defense information
- Penalty: Life in prison without parole

Details
- Date apprehended: August 23, 2001
- Imprisoned at: FCI Cumberland, Allegany County, Maryland; BOP Register#: 41051-083
- Military career
- Allegiance: United States (until 1999)
- Branch: United States Air Force
- Service years: 1980–2000
- Rank: Master sergeant
- Conflicts: Gulf War

Brian Patrick Regan (born October 23, 1962, in New York, New York) is an American convict and former intelligence officer serving a life sentence for espionage. As a United States Air Force master sergeant, he was a signals intelligence (SIGINT) specialist assigned to the National Reconnaissance Office. His severe lifelong dyslexia played a role in his identification and capture, which led the media to dub him "the spy who couldn't spell".

In 1999, amid mounting debts and a deteriorating personal life, Regan began exfiltrating large quantities of classified information from the Intelligence Community intranet, Intelink. After failing to deploy as required, he was forced into retirement by the Air Force in 2000 but soon returned to NRO as a contractor for TRW and continued to steal secrets. At the same time, Regan was shopping the intelligence to the governments of Iraq, Libya and China, going as far as writing a letter to Saddam Hussein.

By December 2000, the FBI had become aware of Regan's activities. He was arrested at Dulles International Airport while attempting to board a flight to Zürich, Switzerland, with classified documents concealed in his shoes. Caches of additional documents were found buried in wooded areas in Virginia and Maryland. Regan was charged under the Espionage Act and pled not guilty in February 2002. He was convicted on two counts of attempted espionage and one of unlawful retention of national defense information.

In sentencing, the government requested the death penalty in what would have been the first capital case for espionage since those of Julius and Ethel Rosenberg, however in sentencing the jury did not reach the unanimous consensus required to impose it, and as a result he was instead sentenced to life without parole. He is currently imprisoned at Federal Correctional Institution, Cumberland in Maryland.

== Early life and military career ==
He was born October 23, 1962, in Queens, New York. He grew up on Long Island and attended Mill Lane Junior High and Farmingdale High School in Farmingdale, New York. His childhood has been characterized as a difficult one; due to having dyslexia and having an "odd" personality, he was frequently bullied and ridiculed by classmates and children in his neighborhood. Though raised in a devout Catholic family, friends reported that he identified as an atheist as an adult.

While stationed at Iráklion Air Station on Crete, Greece, he met a Swedish tourist, Anette Stenqvist. They married in Texas in 1984 while he was stationed at Kelly Air Force Base. Both were 21. Over the years he was known to have several affairs but remained a steady father to his four children.

== Espionage activity ==
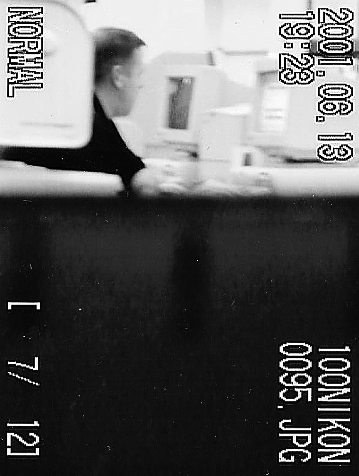
Regan searching embassy addresses under FBI surveillance at the Crofton Library in Maryland, June 13.

From July 1995 to August 2000, Regan worked as a USAF assignee at the National Reconnaissance Office (NRO) in Chantilly, Virginia, and was a signals intelligence specialist. He was forced into retirement in August 2000, having failed to accept an overseas deployment. In October 2000, he was hired by TRW Inc., but brought back to NRO and monitored. In 1999, he had begun downloading data from Intelink, and in total removed 20,000 pages, CD-ROMs and videotapes from NRO. Regan's financial situation, a rift in his marriage, as well as the realization he would not be promoted again, eventually gave him the idea to commit espionage to make money. According to prosecutors, he had credit card debts of $117,000 and wrote a letter to Saddam Hussein offering to sell intelligence material for $13 million. He also made similar offers to Libya and China. He buried the majority of the stolen documents in several forests.

The plot was first discovered in December 2000, when an informant from the Libyan Consulate in New York handed the FBI a series of letters. The letters contained a letter written in a code Regan had created, as well as details on how to decode the letter, as well as code sheets. Each envelope also contained aerial images taken by US satellites of military sites in the Middle East, as well as other imagery to prove he wasn't bluffing. After narrowing the search down to Regan due in part to his dyslexia, FBI agent Steve Carr and other investigators began investigating him in April 2001.

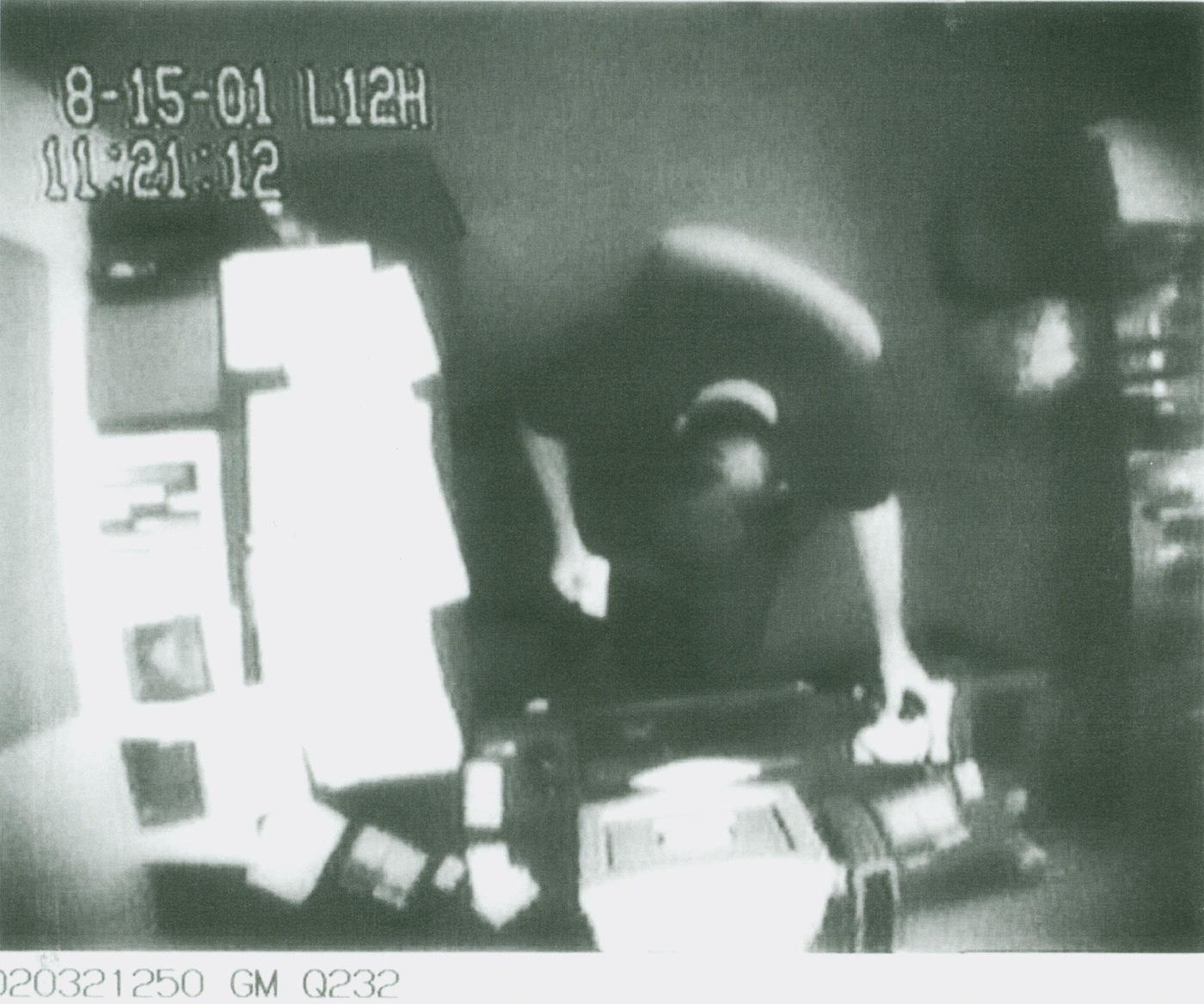
Regan committing espionage in his NRO office, August 15, 2001.

On June 26, 2001, Regan flew to Berlin, Germany, and on to Munich. His checked baggage for the flight contained glue and packing tape. On July 3, he flew back to Virginia. This travel was not in connection with any official duties. On Monday, July 30, 2001, Regan began his TRW assignment at NRO. Despite only being assigned to work on some basic orientation and online learning courses, NRO cameras observed him using his work computer to again access unrelated Intelink files, with agents observing him taking notes.

== Arrest and conviction ==
In August 2001, Regan was arrested by the FBI while riding aboard a mobile lounge at Dulles International Airport, where he was preparing to board a flight to Zürich, Switzerland. He was carrying classified documents and contact information for Iraqi, Libyan, and Chinese embassies in Switzerland hidden in his shoes. In February 2002, he pleaded not guilty to the charges.

Jury selection for the trial began in January 2003, with potential jurors required to fill in questionnaires asking their opinions on crime, espionage, the September 11 attacks, and the death penalty. Regan's lawyers had attempted to delay the trial due to the potential invasion of Iraq. Prosecutors sought the death penalty, the first time it would have been used for espionage since Julius and Ethel Rosenberg were executed by electric chair in 1953; the death penalty for espionage had been reinstated in 1994 but had not yet been sought on 10 prior occasions. The prosecution called upon FBI code expert Daniel Olson to testify as to the secret messages Regan had attempted to send to Iraq and Libya; Olson described the code as "sophisticated". Regan's attorney Jonathan Shapiro argued that the information Regan had used was "worthless" and described his actions as merely "bad judgment". Lawyer Nina Ginsberg argued that no serious foreign power would have dealt with him.

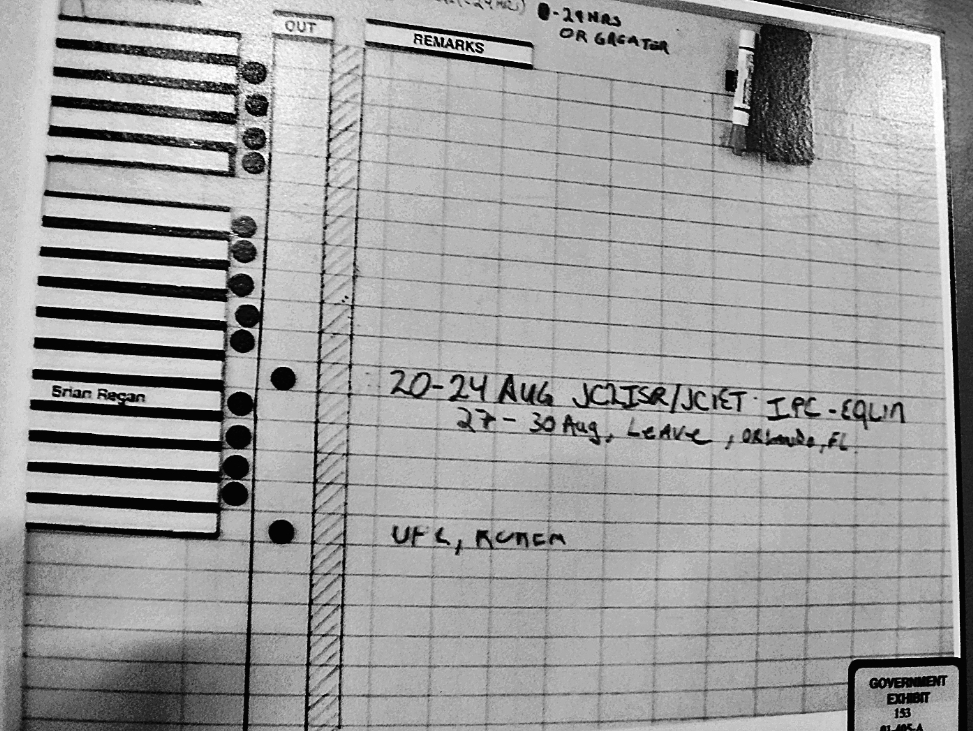
Whiteboard at NRO's Signals Intelligence Applications and Integration Office showing Regan's leave entry including his cover story claiming he was to visit Orlando.

The following month, Regan was found guilty on two counts of attempted espionage and one of gathering national defense information, but the jury declined to impose the death penalty. He was acquitted of the charge of attempting to spy for Libya. He was sentenced to life imprisonment without parole in March of that year. Regan's wife Anette avoided prosecution for attempting to cover up his actions.

== Debriefing ==
Five months after the conclusion of the trial, FBI agents debriefed Regan and began searching for the classified documents. Regan ultimately led investigators to the materials he had stolen, buried deep underground. He had written the locations on a note, placed the note in a toothbrush holder, and buried the toothbrush holder under the I-95 exit sign near Fredericksburg, Virginia. Highly sensitive documents would be discovered in the states of Maryland and Virginia, with over 10,000 assorted papers, videos, and CD-ROMs found; two anonymous sources believed all the hidden material had been found. In one instance, when Regan led agents to a cache, they dug it up, only to discover he had inadvertently left a sticky note with his name on it attached to one of the classified materials.

== Incarceration ==
Regan is housed at FCI Cumberland, in Allegany County, Maryland. He was previously incarcerated at Federal Correctional Institution, Terre Haute in Terre Haute, Indiana.

== In media ==
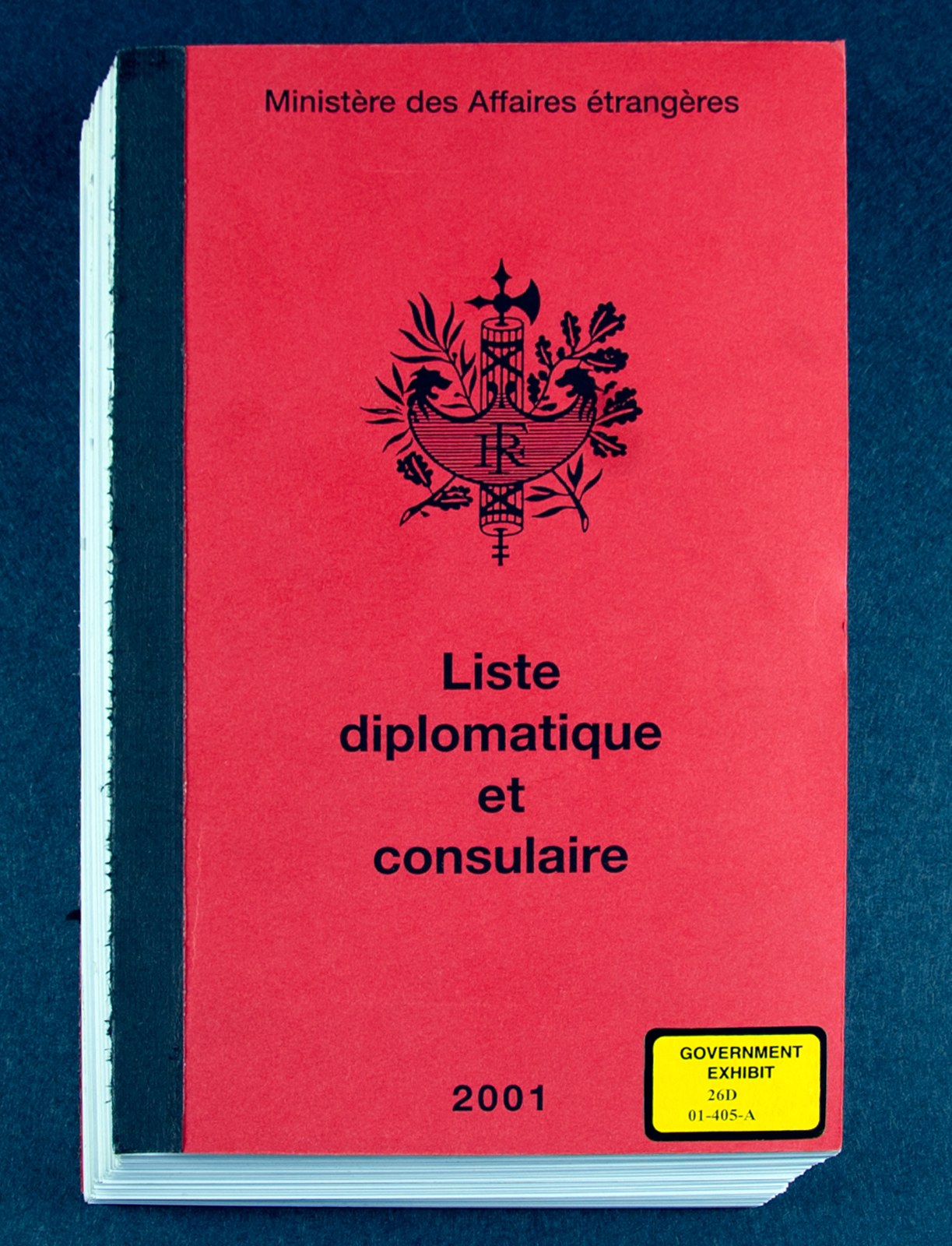
The booklet of contact information for consulates that Regan used to try to sell the information.

In 2016, journalist Yudhijit Bhattacharjee released a book about Regan and his capture titled The Spy Who Couldn't Spell: A Dyslexic Traitor, an Unbreakable Code, and the FBI's Hunt for America's Stolen Secrets.

== See also ==
- Aldrich Ames
- Robert Hanssen
- Chelsea Manning
- Edward Snowden
