= Open Source Information System =

American unclassified network

The Open Source Information System (OSIS) is the former name of an American unclassified network serving the U.S. intelligence community with open source intelligence.

Since mid-2006, the content of OSIS is now known as Intelink-U while the network portion is known as DNI-U.

== Contents ==
OSIS contents include:

- CIRC (Central Information Reference and Control)
- A database of over 10 million titles on scientific and technical topics, including patents, standards, military equipment and systems.
- Conference Database of upcoming symposia, congresses, and conventions in the areas of science, technology, engineering, politics, and economics.
- DTED (Digital Terrain Elevation Data) map collection [from The National Geospatial-Intelligence Agency (NGA), formerly the National Imagery and Mapping Association (NIMA)] provides global coverage.
- OSC (Open Source Center, formerly FBIS, Foreign Broadcast Information Service) products include the Daily Reports, Science & Technology Perspectives, Trends, and Pacific Rim Economic Review.
- IC ROSE database service provides searchable text articles from hundreds of periodicals on a wide range of subjects.
- TCOM (Telecommunications) contains abstracts and complete articles on telecommunications related topics.
- TEL (Technical Equipment List) indexes over 100,000 brochures and manuals on telecommunications and related equipment.

Additional commercial datasources, such as Oxford Analytica, as well as unclassified library holdings of several OSIS member agencies, including DIA, reside on OSIS. OSIS also offers specialized software and other tools to assist users in analysis and graphical interpretations of data.

== Real time translation ==
OSIS makes available the National Air Intelligence Center's (NAIC) SYSTRAN machine translation (MT) capability to provide "real time" rough translations of foreign language information. This was the first MT system to be integrated with the Web; implemented by the MITRE Corporation in the early 1990s.

OSIS users access the World Wide Web and employ the full range of Internet protocols to collect information and conduct business with U.S. Government, academic and industrial organizations. OSIS users are seen by non-U.S. Government Internet clients as "osis.gov".

A firewall prevents non-OSIS Internet users from accessing the OSIS.

== See also ==
- Intelink
