= ISCAP =

ISCAP is an abbreviation for:

- Interagency Security Classification Appeals Panel
- Islamic State's Central Africa Province
