= Cryptographic Quarterly =

Internal, classified quarterly journal

The Cryptographic Quarterly is an internal, classified journal of the U.S. National Security Agency (NSA).

In 2003, Michael Ravnitzky submitted a Freedom of Information Act (FOIA) request for an index of articles published in their Cryptographic Quarterly journal. Three years later in 2006, the NSA declassified a number of these articles from the 1980s and 1990s. A number of these declassified documents have been made publicly available.
