= Intelink =

US intelligence agency intranets

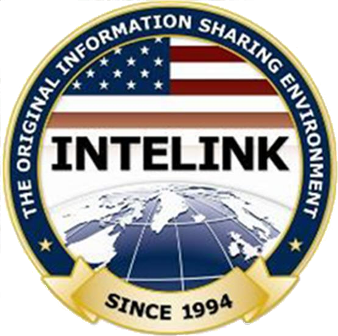
- Intelink icon

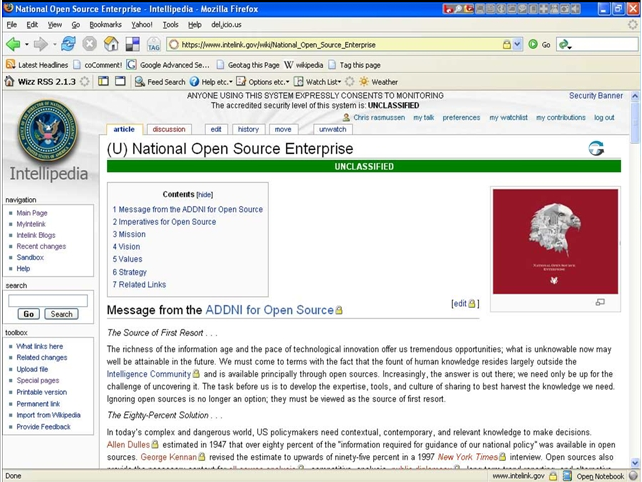
- Screenshot A screenshot of Intellipedia, a wiki used by the US Intelligence community.
- Website type: Government
- Owner: United States Intelligence Community
- Website: https://www.intelink.gov/ (unclassified)
- Commercial: No
- Current status: Active

Intelink is a group of secure intranets used by the United States Intelligence Community. The first Intelink network was established in 1994 to take advantage of Internet technologies (though not connected to the public Internet) and services to promote intelligence dissemination and business workflow. Since then it has become an essential capability for the US intelligence community and its partners to share information, collaborate across agencies, and conduct business. Intelink refers to the web environment on protected top secret, secret, and unclassified networks. One of the key features of Intelink is Intellipedia, an online system for collaborative data sharing based on MediaWiki. Intelink uses WordPress as the basis of its blogging service.

== Versions on different intranets ==
=== Intelink-U ===
Intelink-U (Intelink-SBU) is a sensitive but unclassified (SBU) variant of Intelink which was established for use by U.S. federal organizations and properly vetted state, tribal, and local officials so sensitive information and open source intelligence could be shared amongst a secure community of interest. Intelink-U was formerly known as the Open Source Information System (OSIS). Intelink-U operates on the DNI-U network.

=== Intelink-S ===
Intelink-S (Intelink-Secret or Intelink-SIPRNet) is the secret-level variant of Intelink which is primarily used by the U.S. Departments of Defense, State, and Justice. Intelink-S operates on SIPRNet.

=== Intelink-TS ===
Intelink-TS (Intelink-SCI) is the Intelligence Community's Intelink which facilitates sharing intelligence products up to the Top Secret/Sensitive Compartmented Information (SCI) level. Intelink-TS operates on JWICS.

=== Intelink-P ===
Intelink-P (Intelink-PolicyNet) is run by the Central Intelligence Agency as CIA's sole-source link to the White House and other high-level, intelligence consumers. Today, Intelink-P is more commonly referred to as CapNet.

=== Intelink-C ===
Intelink-C (Intelink-Commonwealth) links the United States, the United Kingdom, Canada, and Australia intelligence communities at the TS/SCI level. Today, Intelink-C is more commonly referred to by its network name of STONEGHOST.

== Books and novels ==
In 1999 Fredrick Thomas Martin wrote a book about Intelink, titled How U.S. Intelligence Built INTELINK, The World's Largest, Most Secure Network. It claims to be an inside look at the U.S. intelligence community's worldwide, super-secure intranet, and the never-before-published story of Intelink.

In the novel Rogue Warrior: Task Force Blue by Richard Marcinko, the protagonist uses Intelink, during his mission countering domestic terrorism in the United States, and his assassination of a Ross Perot-like character, who is the architect of a domestic terror network.

In the novel Threat Vector by Tom Clancy, one of the characters found an exploit in the Microsoft's Remote Desktop Protocol that allowed him to penetrate the networks of a United States defense contractor and exploit that penetration to access Intelink-TS.

== Controversies ==
Two chatrooms were created and hosted on Intelink titled LBTQA and IC_Pride_TWG, where employees allegedly discussed explicit behavior. Tulsi Gabbard fired over 100 employees at 15 security agencies who participated in the chatrooms, and cancelled their security clearances.
