= Declassification =

Publication of formerly secret information

Declassification is the process of ceasing a protective classification, often under the principle of freedom of information. Procedures for declassification vary by country. Papers may be withheld without being classified as secret, and eventually made available.

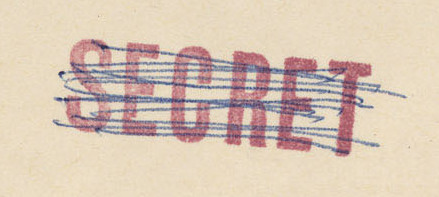
Scribbled out "SECRET" on the 1945 written and 1961 declassified Szilárd petition

== United Kingdom ==
Classified information has been governed by various Official Secrets Acts, the latest being the Official Secrets Act 1989. Until 1989 requested information was routinely kept secret invoking the public interest defence; this was largely removed by the 1989 Act. The Freedom of Information Act 2000 largely requires information to be disclosed unless there are good reasons for secrecy.

Confidential government papers such as the yearly cabinet papers used routinely to be withheld formally, although not necessarily classified as secret, for 30 years under the thirty year rule, and released usually on a New Year's Day; freedom of information legislation has relaxed this rigid approach.

== United States ==
Executive Order 13526 establishes the mechanisms for most declassifications, within the laws passed by Congress. The originating agency assigns a declassification date, by default 25 years. After 25 years, declassification review is automatic with nine narrow exceptions that allow information to remain as classified. At 50 years, there are two exceptions, and classifications beyond 75 years require special permission. Because of changes in policy and circumstances, agencies are expected to actively review documents that have been classified for fewer than 25 years. They must also respond to Mandatory Declassification Review and Freedom of Information Act requests. The National Archives and Records Administration houses the National Declassification Center to coordinate reviews and Information Security Oversight Office to promulgate rules and enforce quality measures across all agencies. NARA reviews documents on behalf of defunct agencies and permanently stores declassified documents for public inspection. The Interagency Security Classification Appeals Panel has representatives from several agencies.

== See also ==
- Freedom of information
- Freedom of information legislation
- United States v. Reynolds
