= James Saenz =

American defense policy advisor

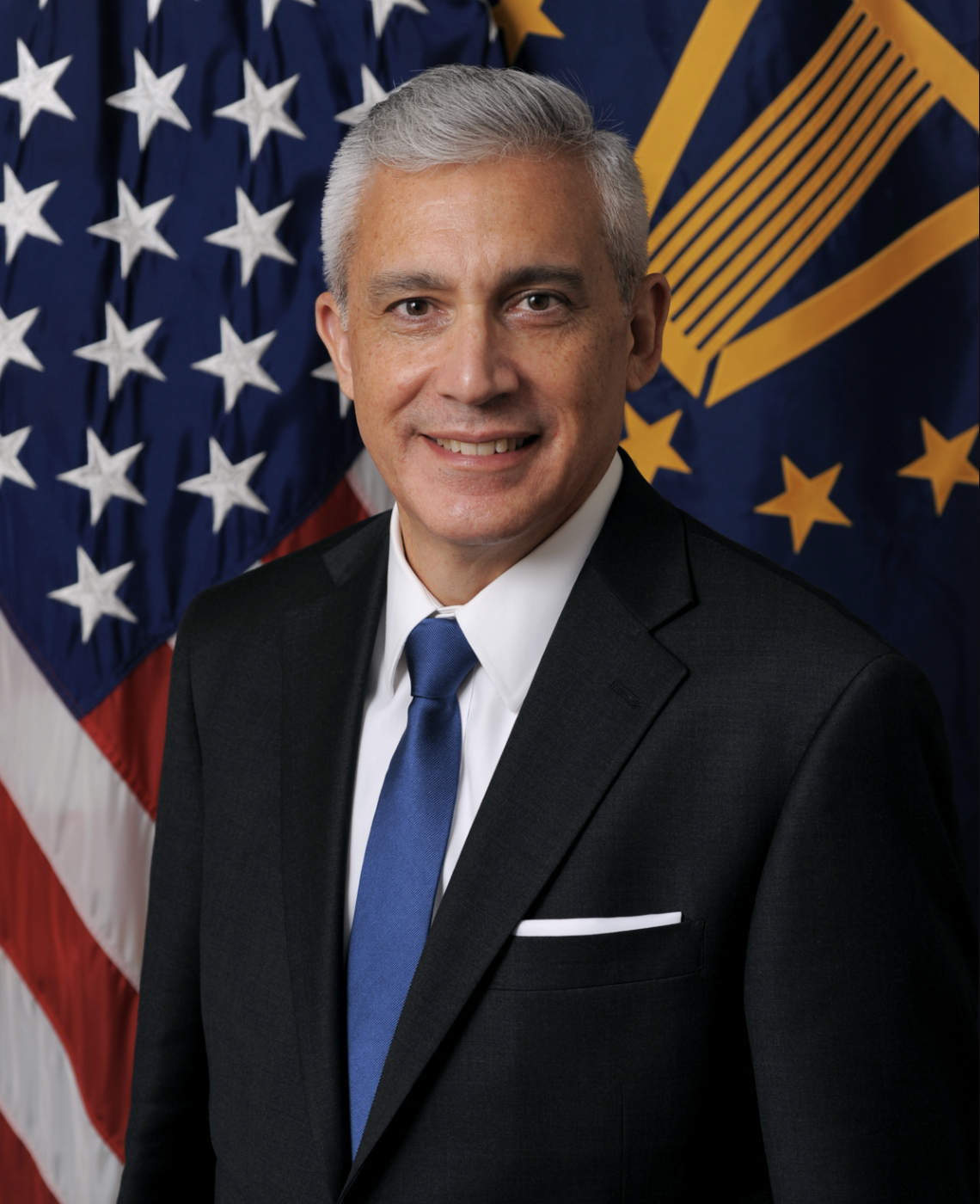

Deputy Assistant Secretary of Defense for Counternarcotics and Stabilization Policy
- Incumbent
- Assumed office October 2021
- President: Joe Biden
- Preceded by: Ezra Cohen

Personal details
- Education: United States Military Academy (BS); United States Army Command and General Staff College (MS); National Defense University (MS)

Military service
- Allegiance: United States
- Branch/service: United States Army
- Years of service: 1987–2017
- Rank: Colonel

James Saenz is an American defense official who currently serves as the Deputy Assistant Secretary of Defense for Counternarcotics and Stabilization Policy in the Office of the Under Secretary of Defense for Policy.

== Education and military service ==
Saenz graduated from the United States Military Academy in 1987 and commissioned as an engineer officer. Later, became a special forces officer, with deployments in support of Operations Desert Shield and Desert Storm and Operation Enduring Freedom serving for 30 years.

== Career ==
After retiring from the military, Saenz served as senior advisor at the Washington Metropolitan Area Transit Authority. In October 2021, Saenz was appointed to Deputy Assistant Secretary of Defense for Counternarcotics and Stabilization Policy.
