= For Official Use Only =

Information security designation

For Official Use Only (FOUO) is an information security designation used by some governments.

== United States ==
Among U.S. government information, FOUO was primarily used by the U.S. Department of Defense as a handling instruction for Controlled Unclassified Information (CUI) which may be exempt from release under exemptions two to nine of the Freedom of Information Act (FOIA). It is one of the various sub-categorizations for strictly unclassified information which, on 24 February 2012, was officially consolidated as CUI.

Other departments continuing the use of this designation include the Department of Homeland Security.

=== U.S. Department of Defense ===
On 24 February 2012, the Under Secretary of Defense for Intelligence published the publicly available DoDM 5200.01 DoD Information Security Program, a four-volume manual consolidating all marking of information used by the U.S. Department of Defense. Most of the information regarding FOUO was in the now-superseded fourth volume, but the second volume also contains guidelines on FOUO information.

On 6 March 2020, the DoD replaced DoDM 5200.01 Volume 4 with DoDM 5200.48 - Controlled Unclassified Information (CUI). The term "FOUO" had been defined in DoDM 5200.01 Vol 4. It is no longer in the replacement document except as a reference to not requiring a "U" marking in the banner or footer signifying unclassified information as was required with the "old FOUO marking" (para 3.4.b.(1)).

== Australia ==
For Official Use Only (FOUO) was one of five categories of the Dissemination Limiting Marker (DLM) defined by the Australian Government Information Security Management Guidelines. The guidelines state that FOUO should only be used on unclassified information, when its compromise may cause limited damage to national security, Australian Government agencies, commercial entities or members of the public. However unlike the United States usage, the presence or absence of an FOUO marker expressly does not provide any information about the document's status under the Freedom of Information Act. Since 2018 this has been replaced by OFFICIAL:Sensitive.

== Germany ==
VS-Nur für den Dienstgebrauch(short VS-NfD)(FOR OFFICIAL USE ONLY) is one of four secrecy designations in use by the Federal Republic of Germany.

It is denoted at the top of each document in either black or blue text reading "VS-NUR FÜR DEN DIENSTGEBRAUCH," which is always written in Upper case.

== See also ==
- Classified information
- Classified information in the United States
- Freedom of information laws by country
- Sensitive but unclassified
