= Stephen Joseph Ratkai =

Russian spy

- Born: 1963; Antigonish, Nova Scotia, Canada
- Occupations: Short-order cook; agent for Soviet intelligence
- Status: Pleaded guilty in February 1989, sentenced to 9 years; paroled
- Criminal charge: Espionage

Stephen Joseph Ratkai is a Hungarian-Canadian who was arrested, charged and convicted of espionage in St. John's, Newfoundland, in February 1989. Ratkai was born near Antigonish, Nova Scotia, but spent his formative years in both the People's Republic of Hungary and Canada after his father returned to Budapest. While studying chemical engineering in Budapest, he was recruited by Soviet Intelligence to become a courier for information on the SOSUS network site at the US Naval Station in Argentia, Newfoundland. Ratkai was caught in a sting operation jointly organized by the US Office of Naval Intelligence, the Canadian Security Intelligence Service (CSIS) and the Royal Canadian Mounted Police (RCMP) and was arrested after receiving documents from a U.S. Navy double agent in June 1988. He pleaded guilty to charges of espionage in February 1989 and was sentenced to 9 years in prison.

== Biography ==
Ratkai was born in 1963 (25 years old in 1988) near Antigonish, Nova Scotia. He had a troubled childhood: his mother killed his half-sister and herself when he was five years old, and his father returned to Budapest with his young son. Ratkai grew up in both Hungary and Canada, finishing high school in Canada and attempting unsuccessfully to join the Canadian Forces when he was 19. Rejected on physical grounds, he returned to Budapest and studied chemical engineering.

== Espionage ==
While studying in Hungary, Ratkai was recruited by Soviet Intelligence to act as a courier for operations in Canada. His first mission was to receive documents from an apparently disaffected US Navy officer stationed in Argentia, Newfoundland. The officer, Lieutenant Donna Geiger, was actually a double agent, and the entire situation was a "sting" operation concocted by the US Naval Investigative Service; after meeting her several times, receiving documents pertaining to the US SOSUS network, and paying her several thousand dollars, Ratkai was arrested by the RCMP at the Hotel Newfoundland in St. John's, Newfoundland on June 11, 1988.

Ratkai was tried in Newfoundland Superior Court and on February 6, 1989, pleaded guilty to charges of attempted espionage and general spying under the Canadian Official Secrets Act. He was sentenced to 9 years in prison.

== Later life ==
Apparently a model prisoner, Ratkai was released on parole to a Moncton, New Brunswick, halfway house. He got a job as a bricklayer, and later returned to Hungary in 1993. In 1994, he was reportedly selling trucks in Budapest.

== See also ==
- Jeffrey Delisle
