= Interagency Security Classification Appeals Panel =

The Interagency Security Classification Appeals Panel, or "ISCAP", provides the public and users of the classification system with a forum for further review of classification decisions. ISCAP states in order to foster a well-informed public while simultaneously protecting national security interests, checks and balances are needed over the classification system. This requires that some of the work of the U.S. Government be done outside the purview of its citizenry.

The ISCAP was created under Executive Order 12958, "Classified National Security Information," when it was signed on April 17, 1995 and held its first meeting in May 1996. Today the ISCAP receives its guidelines from Executive Order 13526 of December 29, 2009, which superseded Executive Order 12958 and its amendments in full on June 25, 2010.

== Functions ==
Section 5.3 of E.O. 13526 directs the ISCAP to perform four critical functions:

- Classification Challenges: Deciding on appeals by authorized persons who have filed classification challenges under Section 1.8 of E.O. 13526;
- Exemptions from Automatic Declassification: Approving, denying or amending agency exemptions from automatic declassification, as provided in Section 3.3 of E.O. 13526;
- Mandatory Declassification Review Appeals: Deciding on mandatory declassification review appeals by parties whose requests for declassification under Section 3.5 of E.O. 13526, have been denied at the agency level; and
- Inform Decisions: Appropriately inform senior agency officials and the public of final Panel decisions on appeals under Sections 1.8 and 3.5 of E.O. 13526.

Additionally, the ISCAP has another function under section 3.3(c)(1) of E.O. 13526.

- File Series Exemptions: Deciding on agency requests to exempt a designated file series from automatic declassification at 25 years.

== Membership ==
The ISCAP member body consists of senior level representatives appointed by the Departments of State, Defense, and Justice, the National Archives, the Office of the Director of National Intelligence, and the National Security Advisor. Each shall be represented by a senior-level representative who is a full-time or permanent part-time Federal officer or employee designated to serve as a member of the Panel by the respective agency head. The President shall designate a Chair from among the members of the Panel. The Director of ISOO serves as its Executive Secretary, and ISOO staff provides program and administrative support for the panel. The Director of the Central Intelligence Agency may appoint a temporary representative to participate as a voting member in all Panel deliberations and associated support activities concerning classified information originated by the Central Intelligence Agency.

== Goals ==
The Interagency Security Classification Appeals Panel (ISCAP) provides the public and users of the classification system with a forum for further review of classification decisions. The protection of the national security requires that some of the work of the U.S. Government be done outside the purview of its citizenry. In order to ensure an informed public while simultaneously protecting certain information, checks and balances are needed over the classification system.

== Members and Staff ==
The ISCAP is a six member body consisting of senior level representatives appointed by the Departments of State, Defense, and Justice, the Central Intelligence Agency, the National Archives, and the Assistant to the President for National Security Affairs. Each representative appoints a working level liaison to the ISCAP. The President appoints the ISCAP's Chair from among its members. The Director of ISOO serves as its Executive Secretary, and ISOO staff provides program and administrative support for the panel.

== Functions ==
Section 5.3 of Executive Order 12958, as amended, directs the ISCAP to perform three critical functions:

- Classification Challenges: deciding on appeals by authorized persons who have filed classification challenges under Section 1.8 of Executive Order 12958, as amended;
- Exemptions from Automatic Declassification: approving, denying or amending agency exemptions from automatic declassification, as provided in Section 3.3 of Executive Order 12958, as amended; and
- Mandatory Declassification Review Appeals: deciding on mandatory declassification review appeals by parties whose requests for declassification under Section 3.5 of Executive Order 12958, as amended, have been denied at the agency level.

== Bylaws ==
The ISCAP bylaws describe the procedures to be followed by individuals or organizations who wish to bring matters before the ISCAP, and the procedures that the ISCAP will follow to resolve these matters. The ISCAP first published its bylaws on March 15, 1996 (61 FR 10854).

The ISCAP has revised its bylaws to reflect the March 25, 2003, amendment of E.O. 12958. While intelligence sources and methods information remain subject to the jurisdiction of the ISCAP, section 5.3(f) of the amended Order recognizes the special authority and responsibility of the Director of Central Intelligence (this authority likely shifted to the newly created position of Director of National Intelligence) to protect such information.

== Statistical Information ==
For statistical information please verify the ISOO Annual Reports section on ISCAP.

== See also ==
- National Archives and Records Administration
- Mandatory Declassification Review
- Information Security Oversight Office
- Public Interest Declassification Board
- Commission consultative du secret de la défense nationale
- Controlled Unclassified Information
- United States National Security Council
