= Jeffrey Delisle =

Canadian spy for Russia

- Born: March 30, 1971 (age 55); Halifax, Nova Scotia, Canada
- Occupations: Sub-Lieutenant in the Royal Canadian Navy and agent for Russian intelligence
- Spouse: Jennifer Lee Janes (m. 1997–2010)
- Status: Pleaded guilty in October 2012, sentenced to 20 years
- Criminal charges: Espionage

Jeffrey Paul Delisle (born March 30, 1971) is a former sub-lieutenant in the Royal Canadian Navy who passed sensitive information from the top-secret STONEGHOST intelligence sharing network to the Russian spy agency GRU. Delisle's actions have been described as "exceptionally grave" by Canada's Department of National Defence (DND) and "severe and irreparable" by the Canadian Security Intelligence Service.

At court in October 2012, Delisle pleaded guilty to breach of trust and two counts of passing secret information to a foreign entity, contrary to the Security of Information Act. He was sentenced to 20 years in penitentiary, minus time served, by the Chief Judge of the Provincial Court of Nova Scotia on February 8, 2013. On February 13, 2013, the Department of National Defence announced that Delisle had been stripped of his commission and service decorations and been released under Item 1(a), the notation "Dismissed with Disgrace for Misconduct" or "Dismissed for Misconduct".

== Biography ==
=== Early and personal life ===
Delisle graduated from Sackville High School in 1990.

On May 3, 1997, Delisle married Jennifer Lee Janes in Lower Sackville, Nova Scotia. On February 17, 1998, he filed for bankruptcy and declared liabilities of $18,587 and assets of $1,000. In June 2008, Delisle and his wife separated. On May 3, 2010, Delisle and his wife filed for divorce, due to his wife's affair.

=== Military career ===
Delisle served as a naval threat assessment analyst for the Royal Canadian Navy. He initially joined as a reservist in January 1996, enrolling as a regular member in March 2001. In October 2001, Delisle completed a leadership course and became a Master Corporal. In November 2006, Delisle was promoted to Sergeant. In 2008, he enrolled in the faculty of arts at Royal Military College. He received his commission as a Sub-Lieutenant in July 2008. In September 2010, Delisle graduated from Royal Military College with a Bachelor of Arts. He was posted to the multinational naval intelligence and communications centre HMCS Trinity in Halifax in August 2011.

=== Espionage ===
In July 2007, Delisle walked into the Embassy of Russia in Ottawa and offered to sell secret information to the Russian military intelligence service (known as the GRU).

Delisle's activities were particularly damaging due to his access to the Stone Ghost database of intelligence shared between Canada, the United States, the United Kingdom, Australia and New Zealand. Referring to the information he passed on, he said: "It was never really Canadian stuff. ... There was American stuff, there was some British stuff, Australian stuff – it was everybody’s stuff."

Delisle has blamed his espionage activities on his marital problems, rather than financial need. He entered the Russian embassy the day he discovered his wife was having an affair.

=== Investigation and conviction ===
The investigation into Delisle was triggered by a tip from the U.S. Federal Bureau of Investigation on December 2, 2011. His home was searched that month and he was arrested the following January.

Delisle had previously been stopped by Canada Border Services Agency agents at Halifax airport in September 2011 after returning from a trip to Brazil to meet his GRU handler, carrying a large amount of cash and prepaid credit cards. There is no sign this led to an investigation. In May 2013, The Canadian Press reported that Canadian Security Intelligence Service had been aware of Delisle's spying well before the FBI tip, but failed to contact the Royal Canadian Mounted Police.

On February 8, 2013, Delisle was sentenced to 20 years in prison. On February 13, 2013, it was announced by DND that Delisle had been stripped of his commission and service decorations and been dishonourably discharged. DND was also moving immediately to recover the salary paid to Delisle since his arrest in January 2012.

The Parole Board of Canada granted Delisle day parole in October 2018, and full parole in March 2019.

== See also ==
- Stephen Joseph Ratkai
