= Stone Ghost =

Network run by the U.S. Defense Intelligence Agency

STONEGHOST or "Stone Ghost", is a codename for a network operated by the United States' Defense Intelligence Agency (DIA) for information sharing and exchange between the United States, the United Kingdom, Canada and Australia. Some sources say that New Zealand is also participating, and that Stone Ghost therefore connects, and is maintained by the defense intelligence agencies of all Five Eyes countries.

Stone Ghost does not carry Intelink-Top Secret information. In the past, it was known as Intelink-C and may also be referred to as "Q-Lat" or "Quad link". It is a highly secured network with strict physical and digital security requirements. The network hosts information about military topics, and about SIGINT, foreign intelligence and national security.

In October 2022, a paper issued online by the Atlantic Council on sharing intelligence, authored by two now retired intelligence community insiders, refers to this programme: 'The situation is compounded by the different accreditation processes and standards, for example between the United States and the United Kingdom, where national versions of STONEGHOST (the jointly sponsored FVEY Above Secret Defense IT system), are not fully aligned.'

== 2012 Canadian spy case ==
Royal Canadian Navy intelligence officer Sub-Lt. Jeffrey Delisle pled guilty on 10 October 2012 to charges including having downloaded and sold information from the Stone Ghost system to the Russian intelligence agency GRU. He was sentenced to 20 years in prison, minus time served on February 6, 2013, for contravening the Security of Information Act.
