= Ezra Cohen =

American intelligence official (born 1986)

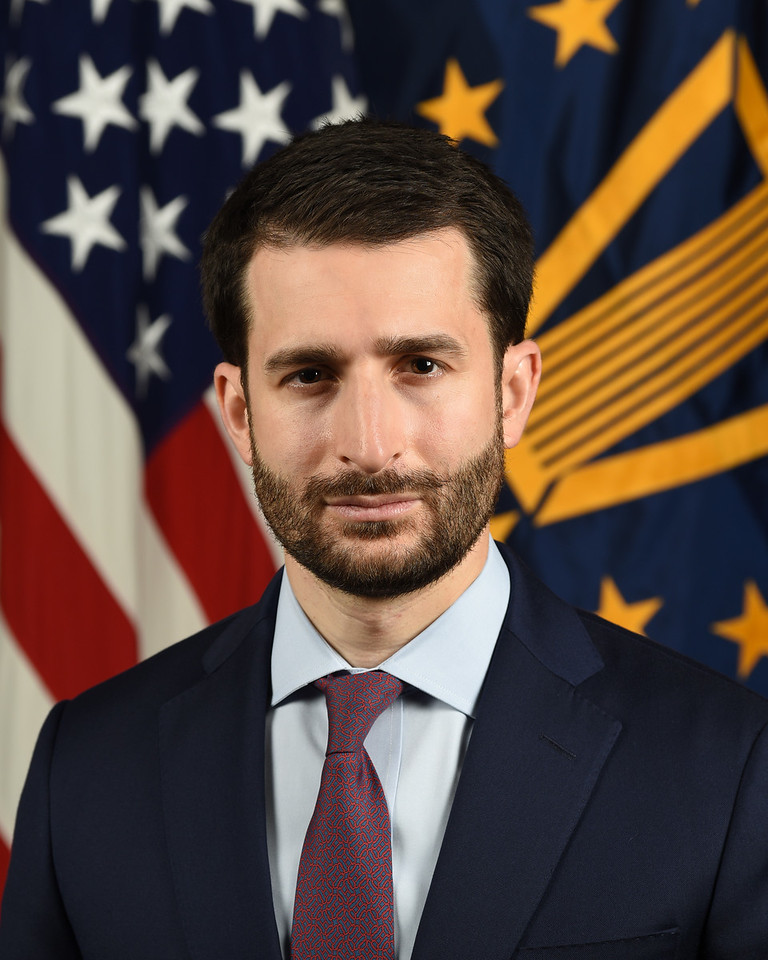

Under Secretary of Defense for Intelligence
- Acting
- In office November 10, 2020 – January 20, 2021
- President: Donald Trump
- Preceded by: Joseph D. Kernan
- Succeeded by: David M. Taylor (Acting)

Assistant Secretary of Defense for Special Operations and Low-Intensity Conflict
- Acting
- In office August 10, 2020 – November 10, 2020
- President: Donald Trump
- Preceded by: Christopher C. Miller (acting)
- Succeeded by: Joseph Tonon (Acting)

Personal details
- Born: Ezra Cohen-Watnick
- Party: Republican
- Spouse: Rebecca Miller
- Education: University of Pennsylvania (BA); University of Chicago (JD)

Ezra Cohen, also known as Ezra Cohen-Watnick, is an American intelligence official who served as the acting under secretary of defense for intelligence during the first Trump Administration. He previously served as the acting assistant secretary of defense for special operations and low-intensity conflict, national security adviser to the United States attorney general and as a former senior director for intelligence programs for the United States National Security Council (NSC).

== Early life and education ==
Cohen was raised in Chevy Chase, Maryland. His father was a lawyer, and his mother was a doctor. He is Jewish. Cohen earned a Bachelor of Arts in history and political science from the University of Pennsylvania and a J.D. degree from the University of Chicago.

== Career ==
Cohen took a position at the Office of Naval Intelligence after graduation. Before joining the White House, Cohen worked for the Defense Intelligence Agency (DIA), beginning in 2010, where he served in Miami, Haiti, Virginia and Afghanistan. Cohen was accepted into the training program for the Defense Clandestine Service.

Cohen underwent training at Camp Peary (commonly known as "The Farm"), where he was trained by the Central Intelligence Agency. He was assigned to Afghanistan, with a GS-13 rank. He was temporarily assigned to the Defense Intelligence Agency Headquarters in 2014. Cohen left the DIA for the National Security Council on January 20, 2017.

=== National Security Council ===
Cohen was brought into the United States National Security Council by Michael T. Flynn, the former Director of the Defense Intelligence Agency and President Donald Trump's first National Security Advisor. He was named the NSC's Senior Director for Intelligence Programs. This directorship was intermittently held by detailed CIA officers. Like Cohen, the immediate preceding Senior Director from the Obama Administration was a political appointee. Some viewed Cohen's appointment as a sign of Trump's mistrust of the CIA.

Following Flynn's resignation in February 2017, the new National Security Advisor, H. R. McMaster, attempted to remove Cohen, but he was overruled by Trump. McMaster attempted to replace Cohen with veteran CIA official Linda Weissgold.

It is alleged that Cohen inadvertently identified reports suggesting that members of Trump's campaign team had been subjected to incidental surveillance by the United States intelligence community, as part of an unrelated review of privacy procedures. This information was passed on to Chairman of the House Intelligence Committee Devin Nunes by Assistant White House Counsel Michael Ellis.

It has been reported that Cohen has advocated using the American intelligence community to overthrow the current Iranian government.

The White House announced Cohen's dismissal on August 2, 2017, following policy disagreements with National Security Advisor H.R. McMaster over Afghanistan, Iran, and Intelligence Oversight. According to The Washington Post, Cohen resigned following a power shift under McMaster. Upon Cohen's departure, the White House commented that "General McMaster appreciates the good work accomplished in the NSC's Intelligence directorate under Ezra Cohen's leadership... General McMaster is confident that Ezra will make many further significant contributions to national security in another position in the administration."

In late September 2017, Cohen was reportedly succeeded by Michael Barry.

=== Support for counterintelligence initiatives ===
In May 2017, Cohen and the FBI assistant director for counterintelligence reportedly advocated for strong law enforcement actions against Chinese government officials conducting operations targeting Chinese dissidents and asylum seekers inside the United States, against objections from Acting Assistant Secretary of State Susan Thornton. Cohen reportedly charged Thornton with "improperly hindering law-enforcement efforts to address China's repeated violations of U.S. sovereignty and law."

On December 25, 2017, The Washington Post reported that in the weeks before Trump's inauguration, Brett Holmgren, Cohen's predecessor in the Obama White House, briefed Cohen on the actions the Obama Administration had taken to counter Russian active measures. Once on the job, Cohen sent out memos identifying counterintelligence threats, including Russia's, as his top priority, officials said. He convened regular meetings in the White House Situation Room at which he pressed counterintelligence officials in other government agencies, including the CIA, to finalize plans for Russia, including those left behind by the Obama team, according to officials in attendance. By spring, national security adviser H. R. McMaster, senior White House Russia adviser Fiona Hill and Cohen began advocating measures to counter Russian disinformation using covert influence and cyber-operations, according to officials.

=== Justice Department ===
In April 2018, he rejoined the Trump administration in the United States Department of Justice, advising then-Attorney General Jeff Sessions on counterterrorism and counterintelligence.

=== Defense Department ===
In May 2020, Cohen was appointed as deputy assistant secretary of defense for counternarcotics and global threats. By September 2020, he had been promoted to acting assistant secretary of defense for special operations and low-intensity conflict. On November 10, 2020, President Trump relieved several senior defense officials, including Secretary of Defense Mark Esper, and Undersecretary of Defense for Intelligence Joseph Kernen, who resigned in anticipation. Trump appointed Cohen to fill the role as acting undersecretary with principal deputy Joseph Tonon assuming the day-to-day duties of the role of ASD SO/LIC.

In December 2020, Cohen was appointed by Trump to chair the Public Interest Declassification Board. He continued serving into Joe Biden's presidency.

== Personal life ==
Cohen is a member of the Union League of Philadelphia, a Republican-leaning patriotic society. He married Rebecca Miller, who served as deputy assistant secretary for public affairs at the Treasury Department, in November 2016, in a Jewish ceremony.

Some adherents of the QAnon conspiracy theory believed Cohen to be the eponymous "Q", a belief Cohen said he found disturbing. In a January 2021 interview, he criticized the Trump administration for not doing more to delegitimize QAnon.
