= Information Security Oversight Office =

Office of the National Archives of the United States

- ISOO

Agency overview
- Formed: December 1, 1978
- Preceding agency: Interagency Classification Review Committee
- Jurisdiction: Federal government of the United States
- Headquarters: 700 Pennsylvania Avenue NW, Washington, D.C.
- Agency executive: Michael D. Thomas, Director
- Parent agency: National Archives and Records Administration
- Key document: Classified National Security Information
- Website: archives.gov/isoo

The Information Security Oversight Office (ISOO) is responsible to the President for policy and oversight of the government-wide security classification system, the Controlled Unclassified Information Program, and the National Industrial Security Program in the United States. The ISOO is a component of the National Archives and Records Administration (NARA) and receives policy and program guidance from the National Security Council (NSC).

== History ==
On December 1, 1978, President Jimmy Carter established the Information Security Oversight Office through Executive Order 12065, "National Security Information". ISOO replaced the Interagency Classification Review Committee (ICRC), which had been created by Executive Order 11652 issued by President Richard Nixon in 1972.

The ICRC was composed of representatives from the Departments of Defense, Justice and State; the predecessor to the United States Department of Energy, the Atomic Energy Commission, and the CIA. John Eisenhower chaired the ICRC, which met monthly at the White House. After Eisenhower resigned in 1973, the administrative function of the ICRC was moved to the National Archives and Records Service, a component of the General Services Administration, with the Archivist of the United States, James Rhodes, named as acting chairman. William L. Brown, an attorney with the Atomic Energy Commission, was appointed executive director in October 1973 and served until December, 1975. The committee continued to meet monthly in the Roosevelt Room of the White House.

Former Iowa Congressman Michael Blouin served as the first Director of ISOO. When Blouin stepped down in 1980, President Carter appointed Steven Garfinkel as ISOO's second Director. Garfinkel served as Director until his retirement in January 2002. In May 2002, the Archivist of the United States appointed J. William Leonard as Director with the approval of President Bush. Leonard served as Director until his retirement in January 2008. William J. Bosanko was named the acting Director in January 2008 and was formally appointed as Director by the Archivist of the United States, with the approval of President Bush, on April 16, 2008. Bosanko served as Director until March 2011. On August 1, 2011, the Archivist of the United States appointed John P. Fitzpatrick as ISOO's fifth Director, with the approval of President Obama. Fitzpatrick served as Director until January 2016. William Cira, associate director for Classification Management, served as acting Director until he retired in December 2016, when the President Trump approved Mark Bradley's appointment as Director of ISOO. Upond Bradley’s retirement from federal service on June 30, 2023, William Fischer, Director of NARA’s National Declassification Center (NDC) was named as the acting Director of ISOO, while retaining his leadership role at the NDC. Effective November 3, 2024, Michael D. Thomas was appointed Director of ISOO by the Archivist of the United States, with the approval of the President.

== Overview ==
=== Mission ===
The ISOO strives to provide for an informed American public by ensuring that the minimum information necessary to the interest of national security is classified and that information is declassified as soon as it no longer requires protection. This is carefully balanced by the imperative to hold certain information in confidence in order to protect from harm America's citizens, its democratic institutions, and its participation in the community of nations.

Specifically, it seeks to:

- Promote and enhance the system that protects the national security information that safeguards the American government and its people.
- Provide for an informed American public by ensuring that the minimum information necessary to the interest of national security is classified and that information is declassified as soon as it no longer requires protection.
- Promote and enhance concepts that facilitate the sharing of information in the fulfillment of mission-critical functions related to national security.
- Provide expert advice and guidance pertinent to the principles of information security.

=== Organization ===
ISOO has three directorates and a staff of approximately 16 people.

- The Directorate for Policy develops security classification policies for classifying, declassifying, and safeguarding national security information.
- The Directorate for Operations evaluates the effectiveness of the security classification programs established by government and industry to protect information vital to our national security interests.
- The Directorate for Controlled Unclassified Information (CUI) develops standardized CUI policies and procedures that appropriately protect sensitive information through effective data access and control measures.

=== Activities ===
- Develops implementing directives and instructions.
- Reviews and approves agency implementing regulations.
- Maintains liaison relationships with agency counterparts and conducts on-site and document reviews to monitor agency compliance.
- Develops and disseminates security education materials for Government and industry; monitors security education and training programs.
- Receives and takes action on complaints, appeals, and suggestions.
- Collects and analyzes relevant statistical data and, along with other information, reports them annually to the President. ISOO analyzes these data and reports them, along with other relevant information, in its Annual Report to the President and its Cost Report. Copies of ISOO Annual Reports are available upon request or for download at the ISOO's section for Reports .
- Serves as spokesperson to Congress, the media, special interest groups, professional organizations, and the public.
- Conducts special studies on identified or potential problem areas and develops remedial approaches for program improvement.
- Recommends policy changes to the President through the National Security Advisor. As appropriate, ISOO convenes and chairs interagency meetings to discuss matters, including possible policy changes, pertaining to the security classification program.
- Provides program and administrative support for the Interagency Security Classification Appeals Panel (ISCAP) under E.O. 13526.
- Provides program and administrative support for the Public Interest Declassification Board (PIDB).
- Reviews requests for original classification authority from agencies.
- Chairs the National Industrial Security Program Policy Advisory Committee (NISPPAC) under E.O. 12829, as amended.
- Chairs the State, Local, Tribal, and Private Sector Policy Advisory Committee (SLTPSPAC) under E.O. 13549.

== See also ==
- Classified information in the United States
- Controlled Unclassified Information (CUI)
- Interagency Security Classification Appeals Panel (ISCAP)
- National Archives and Records Administration (NARA)
- Public Interest Declassification Board (PIDB)
- Title 32 of the Code of Federal Regulations
