= Sensitive but unclassified =

American federal information sensitivity designation

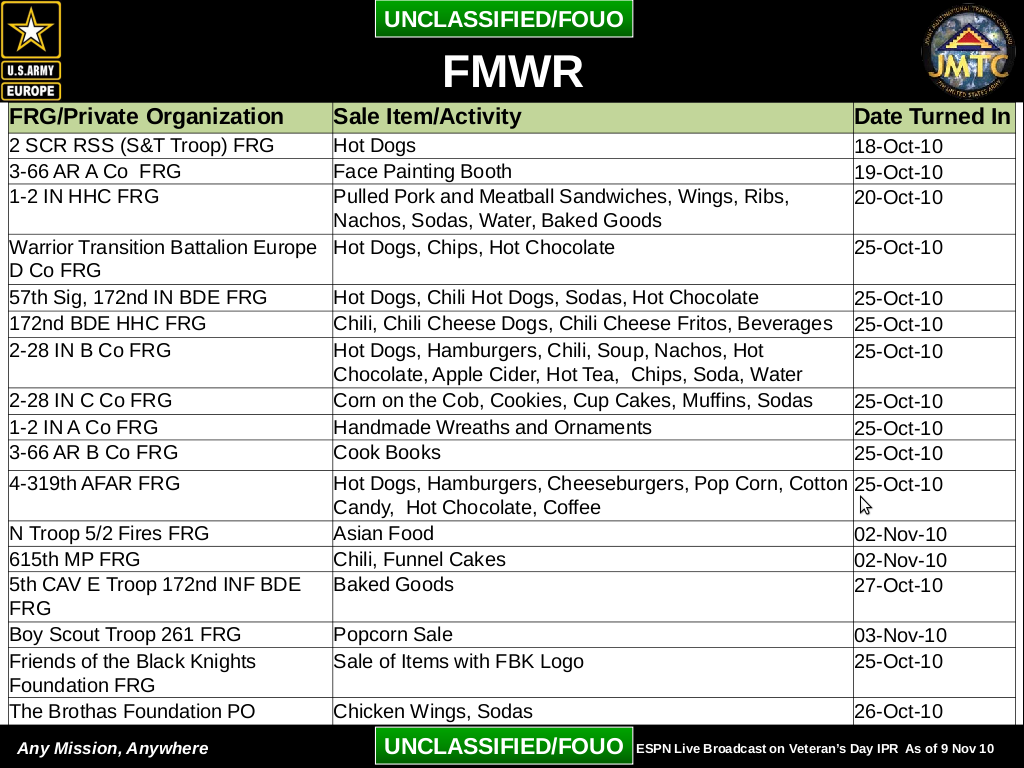
A menu for a party, marked FOUO

Sensitive But Unclassified (SBU) is a designation of information in the United States federal government that, though unclassified, often requires strict controls over its distribution. SBU is a broad category of information that includes material covered by such designations as For Official Use Only (FOUO), Law Enforcement Sensitive (LES), Sensitive Homeland Security Information, Sensitive Security Information (SSI), Critical Infrastructure Information (CII), etc. It also includes Internal Revenue Service materials like individual tax records, systems information, and enforcement procedures. Some categories of SBU information have authority in statute or regulation (e.g. SSI, CII) while others, including FOUO, do not.

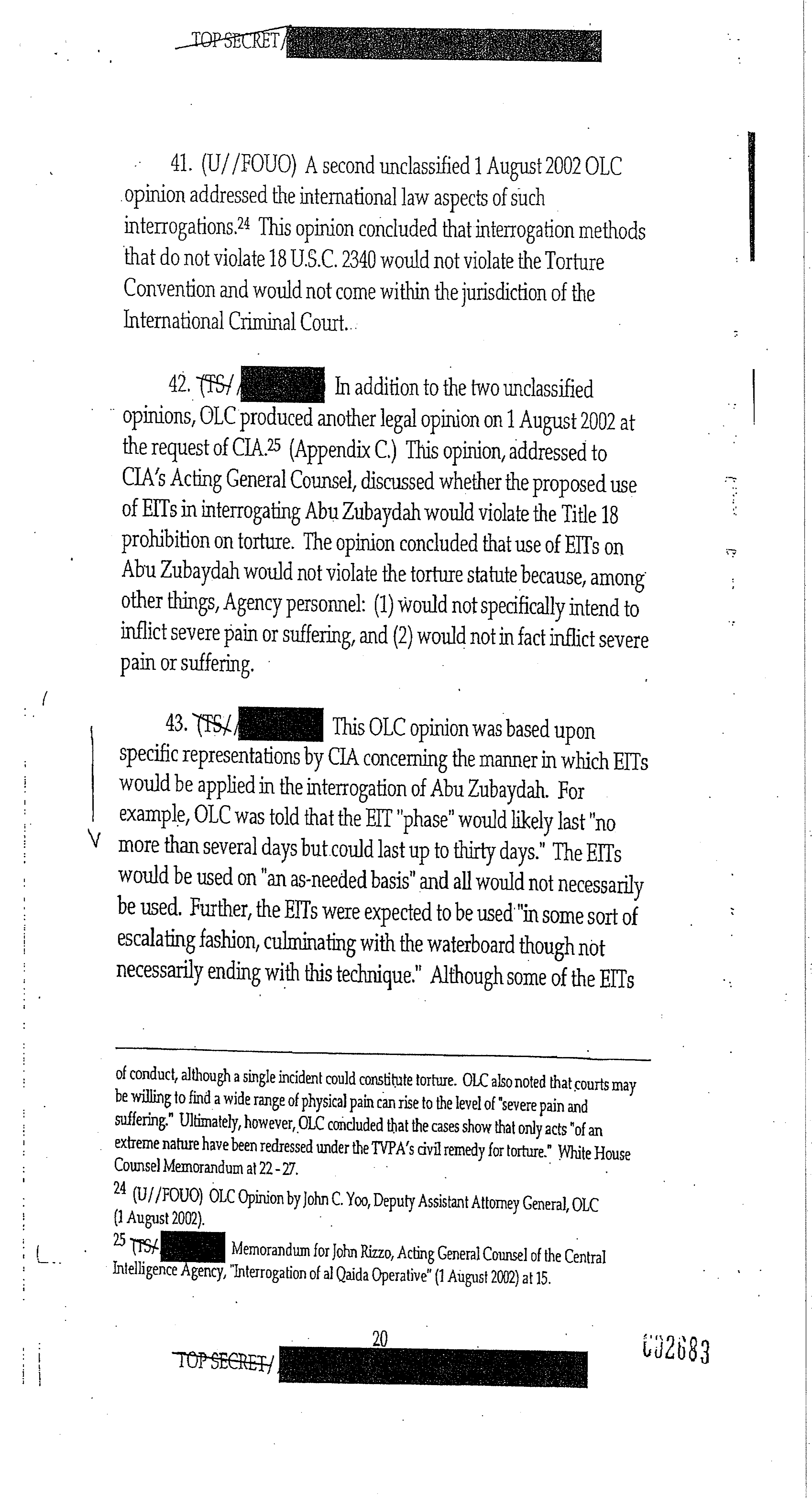
An example of FOUO being mixed in with Top Secret info in the same document. (From the CIA Inspector General report about Torture in the War on Terror)

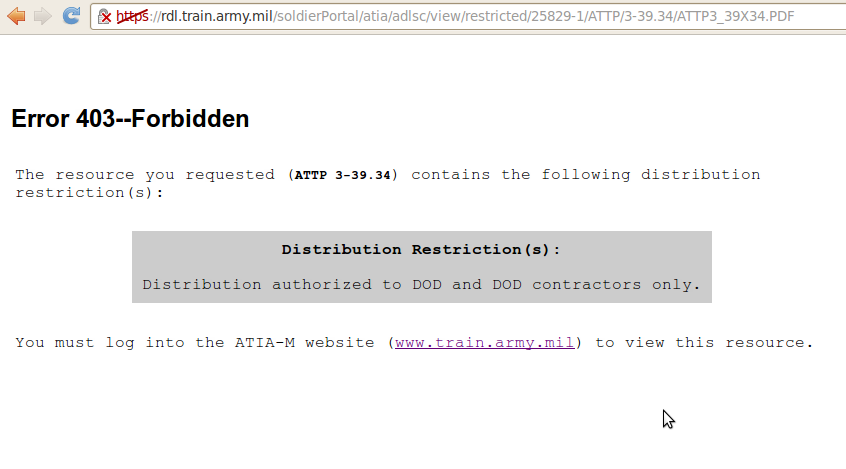
The unclassified "Military Working Dogs" web document, marked Distribution Restricted circa 2011

Sensitive Security Information (SSI) is a category of sensitive but unclassified information under the United States government's information sharing and control rules, often used by TSA and CBP. SSI is information obtained in the conduct of security activities whose public disclosure would, in the judgment of specified government agencies, harm transportation security, be an unwarranted invasion of privacy, or reveal trade secrets or privileged or confidential information.

UNCLASSIFIED//FOUO is primarily a Department of Defense phrase/acronym, used for documents or products which contain material which may be exempt from release under the Freedom of Information Act. It is treated as confidential, which means it cannot be discarded in the open trash, made available to the general public, or posted on an uncontrolled website. It can, however, be shared with individuals with a need to know the content, while still under the control of the individual possessing the document or product.

Information that may be protected with these labels range from personally identifying information such as passport and Social Security numbers to documents protected by the attorney–client privilege. Though SBU information may be exempt from complete disclosure under the Freedom of Information Act, it should not be universally withheld.

PARD (Protect as restricted data) is an unclassified but sensitive marking used in the Department of Energy. It is the marking that was on Dr. Wen Ho Lee's program codes at Los Alamos National Laboratory. He (and many other scientists) backed up such data to tape. The government would later claim this was "espionage" and charge him under 18 U.S.C. § 793, (the Espionage Act) which makes it a felony to "withhold" information related to the "national defense". He eventually pleaded guilty to one of the 54 counts against him. He later won a lawsuit against the government and several newspapers over his treatment.

Limited Distribution, Proprietary, Originator Controlled, Law Enforcement Sensitive were designations the Pentagon attempted in 2011 to exempt from President Obama's Executive Order 13556.

The number of designations in use by various branches of the U.S. government for unclassified information eventually numbered more than 100. On May 9, 2008, President George W. Bush directed their consolidation into a new category: Controlled Unclassified Information (CUI).

== See also ==
- Classified information in the United States
- Thomas Andrews Drake (indicted under the Espionage Act for having a document marked Unclassified/FOUO)
