= Classified information =

Material that government claims requires confidentiality

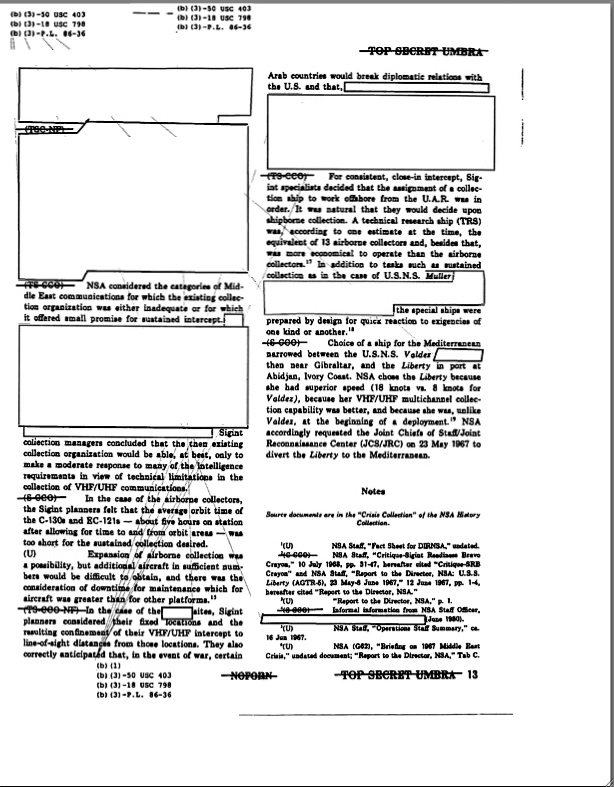
A typical classified document. Page 13 of a U.S. National Security Agency report on the USS Liberty incident, partially declassified and released to the public in July 2004. The original overall classification of the page, "top secret", and the Special Intelligence code word "umbra", are shown at top and bottom. The classification of individual paragraphs and reference titles is shown in parentheses—there are six different levels on this page alone. Notations with leader lines at top and bottom cite statutory authority for not declassifying certain sections.

Classified information is confidential material that a government, corporation, or non-governmental organisation deems to be sensitive information, which must be protected from unauthorized disclosure and that requires special handling and dissemination controls. Access is restricted by law, regulation, or corporate policies to particular groups of individuals with both the necessary security clearance and a need to know.

Classified information within an organisation is typically arranged into several hierarchical levels of sensitivity—e.g. Confidential (C), Secret (S), and Top Secret (TS). The choice of which level to assign a file is based on threat modelling, with different organisations having varying classification systems, asset management rules, and assessment frameworks. Classified information generally becomes less sensitive with the passage of time, and may eventually be reclassified or declassified and made public.

Governments often require a formal security clearance and corresponding background check to view or handle classified material. Mishandling or unlawful disclosure of confidential material can incur criminal penalties, depending on the nature of the information and the laws of a jurisdiction. Since the late twentieth century, there has been freedom of information legislation in some countries, where the public is deemed to have the right to all information that is not considered to be damaging if released. Sometimes documents are released with information still considered confidential redacted. Classified information is sometimes also intentionally leaked to the media to influence public opinion.

In numerous countries, government officials have used information security classification systems to conceal wrongdoing (including criminal conduct by the state) and to impede accountability efforts. This problem is known as 'motivated overclassification'.

== Governmental classification levels ==
=== Top Secret (TS) ===
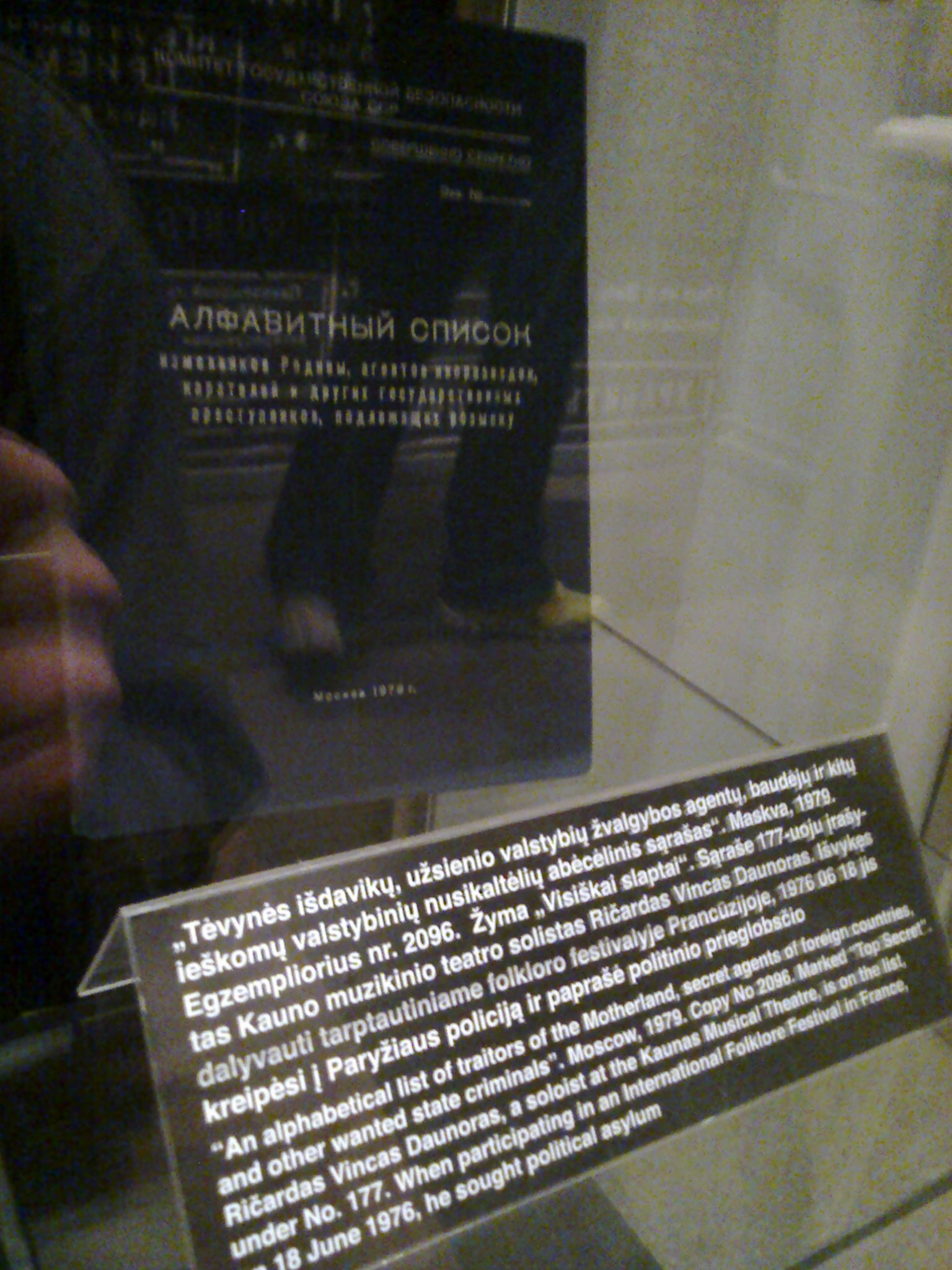
KGB's "List of traitors to the Motherland, agents of foreign intelligence, and other wanted state criminals" (1979) seen in the Museum of Genocide Victims, Vilnius: originally marked top secret

In many jurisdictions, for example, the United States and United Kingdom, Top Secret (TS) is the highest level of classified information. Prior to 1942, the United Kingdom and other members of the British Empire used Most Secret, but this was later changed to match the United States' category name of Top Secret in order to simplify Allied interoperability. The unauthorized disclosure of Top Secret information is expected to cause harm and be of grave threat to national security.

=== Secret ===
It is desired that no document be released which refers to experiments with humans and might have adverse effect on public opinion or result in legal suits. Documents covering such work field should be classified "secret".

— April 17, 1947 Atomic Energy Commission memo from Colonel O.G. Haywood, Jr. to Dr. Fidler at the Oak Ridge Laboratory in Tennessee. As of 2010, Executive Order 13526 bans classification of documents simply to "conceal violations of law, inefficiency, or administrative error" or "prevent embarrassment to a person, organization, or agency".

Secret material is often regarded as causative of "serious damage" to national security if it were publicly available, although not as serious harm as in the case of Top Secret classification.

=== Confidential ===
Confidential material is material that would cause "damage" or be prejudicial to national security if publicly available. It is used in the US since as early as 1936. A relatively recent revision of its definition is in Executive Order 13526.

=== Restricted ===
Restricted material would cause "undesirable effects" if publicly available. Some countries do not have such a classification in public sectors, such as commercial industries. Such a level is also known as "Private Information". Such a level existed within the US Government during World War II but is no longer used.

The Official-Sensitive classification replaced the Restricted classification in April 2014 in the UK. Unlike information only marked Official, information that belong to this class is of some interest to threat actors. Compromise is likely to cause moderate damage to the work or reputation of the organisation and/or the government.

=== Controlled ===
This class of information forms the generality of government business, public service delivery and commercial activity. Compared to the higher levels, the consequence of compromise is lower but not nonexistent.

- In U.S. DOD classification, this class is called Controlled Unclassified Information (CUI). It is divided into five levels specifying different scopes of dissemination. It is the result of an effort to consolidate agency-specific markings such as Sensitive But Unclassified.
- In U.K. classification, this class is called Official. It replaced the previously used Unclassified marking in 2014. Protection is required but is not as strict as the higher levels.

=== Unclassified ===
Unclassified information is low-impact, and therefore does not require any special protection.

== Corporate classification ==
Private corporations often require written confidentiality agreements and conduct background checks on candidates for sensitive positions.

Policies dictating methods for marking and safeguarding company-sensitive information are common in companies, especially as regards information that is protected under trade secret laws. New product development teams are often sequestered and forbidden to share information about their efforts with un-cleared employees. Other activities, such as mergers and financial report preparation generally involve similar restrictions. However, corporate security generally lacks the standardised hierarchical clearance and sensitivity structures and the criminal sanctions of government classification systems.

In the U.S., the Employee Polygraph Protection Act prohibits private employers from requiring lie detector tests, but there are a few exceptions.

== International classification systems ==
When a government agency or group shares information between an agency or group of other country's government they will generally employ a special classification scheme that both parties have previously agreed to honour.

For example, the marking Atomal, is applied to U.S. Restricted Data or Formerly Restricted Data and United Kingdom Atomic information that has been released to NATO. Atomal information is marked COSMIC Top Secret Atomal (CTSA), NATO Secret Atomal (NSAT), or NATO Confidential Atomal (NCA). BALK and BOHEMIA are also used.

=== NATO classifications ===
For example, sensitive information shared amongst NATO allies has four levels of security classification; from most to least classified:

1. COSMIC Top Secret (CTS)
2. NATO Secret (NS)
3. NATO Confidential (NC)
4. NATO Restricted (NR)

- ATOMAL: This designation is added to the NATO security classification when applicable. For example, COSMIC TOP SECRET ATOMAL (CTS-A). ATOMAL information applies to U.S. RESTRICTED DATA or FORMERLY RESTRICTED DATA or United Kingdom Atomic Information released to NATO.

A special case exists with regard to NATO Unclassified (NU) information. Documents with this marking are NATO property (copyright) and must not be made public without NATO permission.

COSMIC is an acronym for "Control of Secret Material in an International Command".

=== International organizations ===
- The European Union has four levels: EU Top Secret, EU Secret, EU Confidential, EU Restricted. (Note that usually the French terms are used.)
  - Très Secret UE/EU Top Secret: information and material the unauthorised disclosure of which could cause exceptionally grave prejudice to the essential interests of the European Union or of one or more of the Member States;
  - Secret UE/EU Secret: information and material the unauthorised disclosure of which could seriously harm the essential interests of the European Union or of one or more of the Member States;
  - Confidentiel UE/EU Confidential: information and material the unauthorised disclosure of which could harm the essential interests of the European Union or of one or more of the Member States;
  - Restreint UE/EU Restricted: information and material the unauthorised disclosure of which could be disadvantageous to the interests of the European Union or of one or more of the Member States.
- Organisation for Joint Armament Cooperation, a European defence organisation, has three levels of classification: OCCAR Secret, OCCAR Confidential, and OCCAR Restricted.
- The United Nations has two classification levels: Confidential and Strictly Confidential.

=== Traffic Light Protocol ===
The Traffic Light Protocol was developed by the Group of Eight countries to enable the sharing of sensitive information between government agencies and corporations. This protocol has now been accepted as a model for trusted information exchange by over 30 other countries. The protocol provides for four "information sharing levels" for the handling of sensitive information.

== By country ==
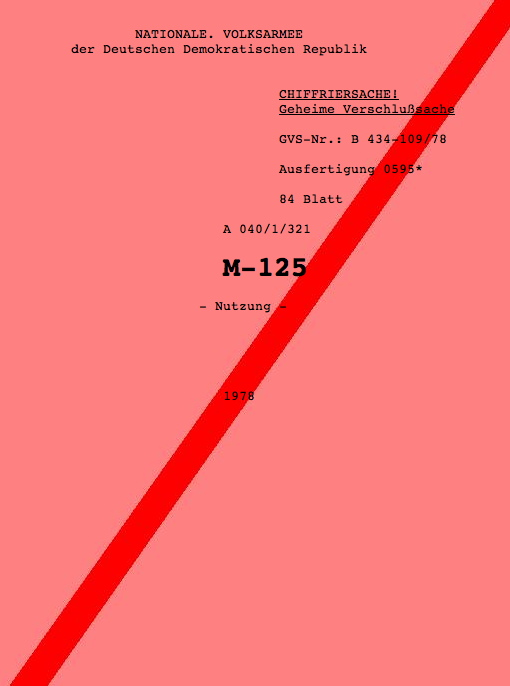
Facsimile of the cover page from an East German operation manual for the M-125 Fialka cipher machine. The underlined classification markings can be translated as "Cryptologic material! Secret restricted material" de:Verschlusssache.

Most countries employ some sort of classification system for certain government information. For example, in Canada, information that the U.S. would classify SBU (Sensitive but Unclassified) is called "protected" and further subcategorised into levels A, B, and C.

=== Australia ===
On 19 July 2011, the National Security (NS) classification marking scheme and the Non-National Security (NNS) classification marking scheme in Australia was unified into one structure.

As of 2018, the policy detailing how Australian government entities handle classified information is defined in the Protective Security Policy Framework (PSPF). The PSPF is published by the Attorney-General's Department and covers security governance, information security, personal security, and physical security. A security classification can be applied to the information itself or an asset that holds information e.g., a USB or laptop.

The Australian Government uses four security classifications: OFFICIAL: Sensitive, PROTECTED, SECRET and TOP SECRET. The relevant security classification is based on the likely damage resulting from compromise of the information's confidentiality.

All other information from business operations and services requires a routine level of protection and is treated as OFFICIAL. Information that does not form part of official duty is treated as UNOFFICIAL.

OFFICIAL and UNOFFICIAL are not security classifications and are not mandatory markings.

Caveats are a warning that the information has special protections in addition to those indicated by the security classification of PROTECTED or higher (or in the case of the NATIONAL CABINET caveat, OFFICIAL: Sensitive or higher). Australia has four caveats:

- Codewords (sensitive compartmented information)
- Foreign government markings
- Special handling instructions
- Releasability caveats

Codewords are primarily used within the national security community. Each codeword identifies a special need-to-know compartment.

Foreign government markings are applied to information created by Australian agencies from foreign source information. Foreign government marking caveats require protection at least equivalent to that required by the foreign government providing the source information.

Special handling instructions are used to indicate particular precautions for information handling. They include:

- EXCLUSIVE FOR (named person)
- CABINET
- NATIONAL CABINET

A releasability caveat restricts information based on citizenship. The three in use are:

- Australian Eyes Only (AUSTEO)
- Australian Government Access Only (AGAO)
- Releasable To (REL).

Additionally, the PSPF outlines Information Management Markers (IMM) as a way for entities to identify information that is subject to non-security related restrictions on access and use. These are:

- Legal privilege
- Legislative secret
- Personal privacy

=== Brazil ===
There are three levels of document classification under Brazilian Law No. 12,527, the 2011 Information Access Act (Lei de Acesso à Informação): ultrassecreto (top secret, lit. 'ultrasecret'), secreto (secret) and reservado (restricted, lit. 'reserved').

An ultrassecreto government-issued document may be classified for a period of 25 years, which may be extended up to another 25 years. Thus, no document remains classified for more than 50 years. This is mandated by the Information Access Act, a change from the previous ruling which allowed documents to have their classification time length renewed indefinitely, effectively shuttering state secrets from the public. The 2011 law applies retroactively to existing documents.

=== Canada ===
==== Background and hierarchy ====
The government of Canada employs two main types of sensitive information designation: Classified and Protected. The access and protection of both types of information is governed by the Security of Information Act, effective 24 December 2001, replacing the Official Secrets Act 1981. To access the information, a person must have the appropriate security clearance and the need to know.

In addition, the caveat "Canadian Eyes Only" is used to restrict access to Classified or Protected information only to Canadian citizens with the appropriate security clearance and need to know.

==== Special operational information ====
SOI is not a classification of data per se. It is defined under the Security of Information Act, and unauthorised release of such information constitutes a higher breach of trust, with a penalty of up to life imprisonment if the information is shared with a foreign entity or terrorist group.

SOIs include:

- military operations in respect of a potential, imminent or present armed conflict
- the identity of confidential source of information, intelligence or assistance to the Government of Canada
- tools used for information gathering or intelligence
- the object of a covert investigation, or a covert collection of information or intelligence
- the identity of any person who is under covert surveillance
- encryption and cryptographic systems
- information or intelligence to, or received from, a foreign entity or terrorist group

In February 2025, the Department of National Defence announced a new category of Persons Permanently Bound to Security (PPBS). The protection would apply to some units, sections or elements, and select positions (both current and former), with access to sensitive Special Operational Information (SOI) for national defense and intelligence work. If a unit or organization routinely handles SOI, all members of that unit will be automatically bound to secrecy. If an individual has direct access to SOI, deemed to be integral to national security, that person may be recommended for PPBS designation. The designation is for life, punishable by imprisonment.

==== Classified information ====
Classified information can be designated Top Secret, Secret or Confidential. These classifications are only used on matters of national interest.

- Top Secret: applies when compromise might reasonably cause exceptionally grave injury to the national interest. The possible impact must be great, immediate and irreparable.
- Secret: applies when compromise might reasonably cause serious injury to the national interest.
- Confidential: disclosure might reasonably cause injury to the national interest.

==== Protected information ====
Protected information is not classified. It pertains to any sensitive information that does not relate to national security and cannot be disclosed under the access and privacy legislation because of the potential injury to particular public or private interests.

- Protected C (Extremely Sensitive protected information): designates extremely sensitive information, which if compromised, could reasonably be expected to cause extremely grave injury outside the national interest. Examples include bankruptcy, identities of informants in criminal investigations, etc.
- Protected B (Particularly Sensitive protected information): designates information that could cause severe injury or damage to the people or group involved if it was released. Examples include medical records, annual personnel performance reviews, income tax returns, etc.
- Protected A (Low-Sensitive protected information): designates low sensitivity information that should not be disclosed to the public without authorization and could reasonably be expected to cause injury or embarrassment outside the national interest. Example of Protected A information include employee identification number, pay deposit banking information, etc.

Federal Cabinet (King's Privy Council for Canada) papers are either protected (e.g., overhead slides prepared to make presentations to Cabinet) or classified (e.g., draft legislation, certain memos).

=== People's Republic of China ===
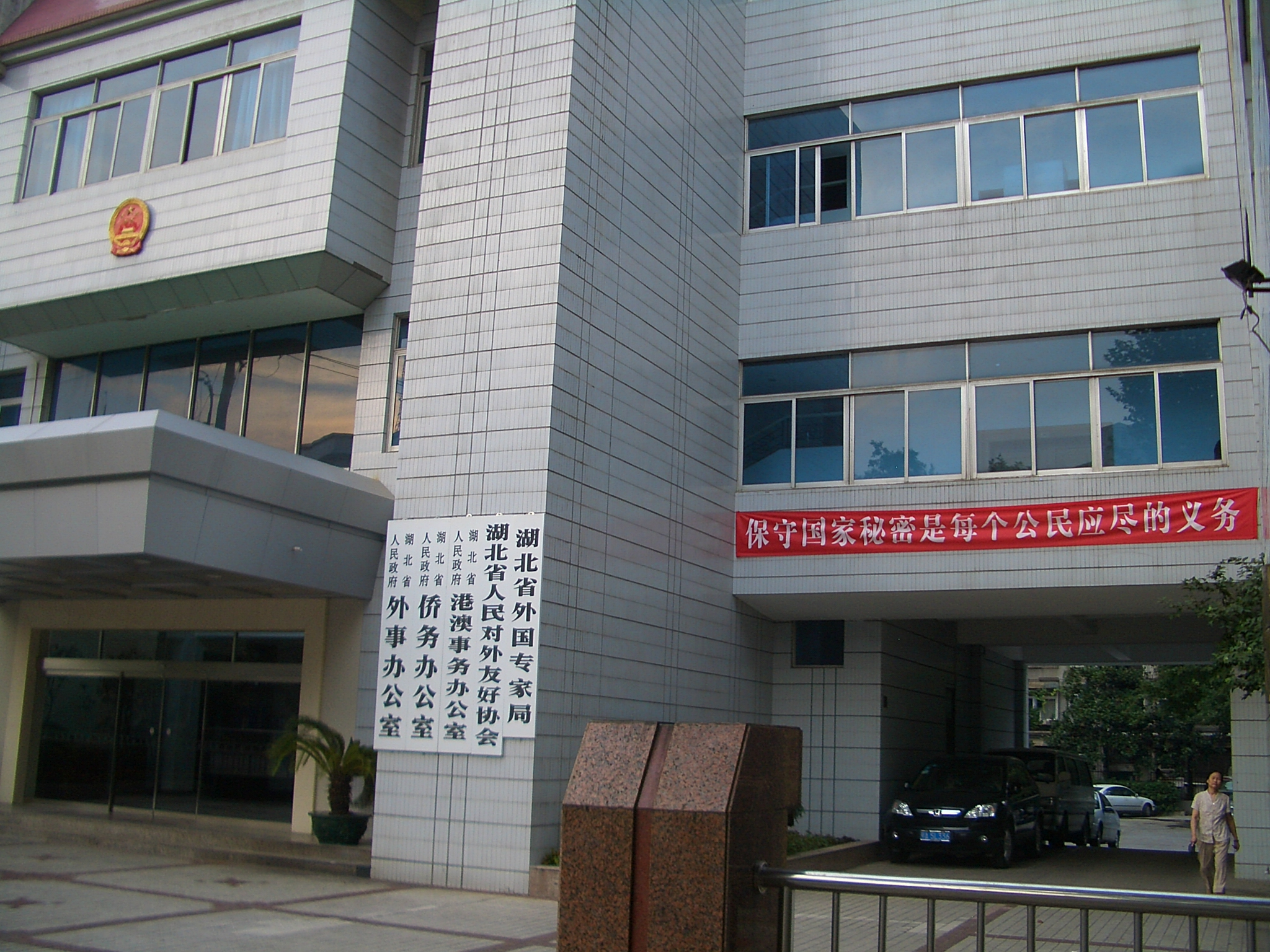
A building in Wuhan housing provincial offices for dealing with foreign countries, etc. The red slogan says, "Protection of national secrets is a duty of every citizen".

The Criminal Law of the People's Republic of China (which is not operative in the special administrative regions of Hong Kong and Macau) makes it a crime to release a state secret. Regulation and enforcement is carried out by the National Administration for the Protection of State Secrets.

Under the 2024 revision of the "Law on Guarding State Secrets", state secrets are defined as those that concern:

1. Major policy decisions on state affairs
2. The building of national defence and in the activities of the armed forces
3. Diplomatic activities and in activities related to foreign countries and those to be maintained as commitments to foreign countries
4. National economic and social development
5. Science and technology
6. Activities for preserving state security and the investigation of criminal offences
7. Any other matters classified as "state secrets" by the national State Secrets Bureau

Secrets can be classified into three categories:

- Top Secret (Chinese: 绝密; pinyin: Juémì), defined as "vital state secrets whose disclosure would cause extremely serious harm to state security and national interests"
- Highly Secret (Chinese: 机密; pinyin: Jīmì), defined as "important state secrets whose disclosure would cause serious harm to state security and national interests"
- Secret (Chinese: 秘密; pinyin: Mìmì), defined as "ordinary state secrets whose disclosure would cause harm to state security and national interests"

=== France ===
In France, classified information is defined by article 413-9 of the Penal Code. The three levels of military classification are

- Très Secret Défense (Very Secret Defence): Information deemed extremely harmful to national defence, and relative to governmental priorities in national defence. No service or organisation can elaborate, process, stock, transfer, display or destroy information or protected supports classified at this level without authorization from the Prime Minister or the national secretary for National Defence. Partial or exhaustive reproduction is strictly forbidden.
- Secret Défense (Secret Defence): Information deemed very harmful to national defence. Such information cannot be reproduced without authorisation from the emitting authority, except in exceptional emergencies.
- Confidentiel Défense (Confidential Defence) - in effect until 2021: Information deemed potentially harmful to national defence, or that could lead to uncovering some information classified at a higher level of security.

Less sensitive information is "protected". The levels are

- Confidentiel personnels Officiers ("Confidential officers")
- Confidentiel personnels Sous-Officiers ("Confidential non-commissioned officers")
- Diffusion restreinte ("restricted information")
- Diffusion restreinte administrateur ("administrative restricted information")
- Non Protégé (unprotected)

A further caveat, spécial France (reserved France) restricts the document to French citizens (in its entirety or by extracts). This is not a classification level.

Declassification of documents can be done by the Commission consultative du secret de la défense nationale (CCSDN), an independent authority. Transfer of classified information is done with double envelopes, the outer layer being plastified and numbered, and the inner in strong paper. Reception of the document involves examination of the physical integrity of the container and registration of the document. In foreign countries, the document must be transferred through specialised military mail or diplomatic bag. Transport is done by an authorised conveyor or habilitated person for mail under 20 kg. The letter must bear a seal mentioning "Par Valise Accompagnee-Sacoche". Once a year, ministers have an inventory of classified information and supports by competent authorities.

Once their usage period is expired, documents are transferred to archives, where they are either destroyed (by incineration, crushing, or overvoltage), or stored.

In case of unauthorized release of classified information, competent authorities are the Ministry of Interior, the 'Haut fonctionnaire de défense et de sécurité ("high civil servant for defence and security") of the relevant ministry, and the General secretary for National Defence. Violation of such secrets is an offence punishable with seven years of imprisonment and a 100,000-euro fine; if the offence is committed by imprudence or negligence, the penalties are three years of imprisonment and a 45,000-euro fine.

=== Hong Kong ===
The Security Bureau is responsible for developing policies in regards to the protection and handling of confidential government information. In general, the system used in Hong Kong is very similar to the UK system, developed from the colonial era of Hong Kong.

Four classifications exists in Hong Kong, from highest to lowest in sensitivity:

- Top Secret (絕對機密)
- Secret (高度機密)
- Confidential (機密)
  - Temporary Confidential (臨時保密)
- Restricted (限閱文件/內部文件)
  - Restricted (staff) (限閱文件(人事))
  - Restricted (tender) (限閱文件 (投標))
  - Restricted (administration) (限閱文件 (行政))

Restricted documents are not classified per se, but only those who have a need to know will have access to such information, in accordance with the Personal Data (Privacy) Ordinance.

=== New Zealand ===
New Zealand uses the Restricted classification, which is lower than Confidential. People may be given access to Restricted information on the strength of an authorisation by their Head of department, without being subjected to the background vetting associated with Confidential, Secret and Top Secret clearances. New Zealand's security classifications and the national-harm requirements associated with their use are roughly similar to those of the United States.

In addition to national security classifications there are two additional security classifications, In Confidence and Sensitive, which are used to protect information of a policy and privacy nature. There are also a number of information markings used within ministries and departments of the government, to indicate, for example, that information should not be released outside the originating ministry.

Because of strict privacy requirements around personal information, personnel files are controlled in all parts of the public and private sectors. Information relating to the security vetting of an individual is usually classified at the In Confidence level.

=== Romania ===
In Romania, classified information is referred to as "state secrets" (secrete de stat) and is defined by the Penal Code as "documents and data that manifestly appear to have this status or have been declared or qualified as such by decision of Government". There are three levels of classification: "Secret" (Secret/S), "Top Secret" (Strict Secret/SS), and "Top Secret of Particular Importance" (Strict secret de interes deosebit/SSID). The levels are set by the Romanian Intelligence Service and must be aligned with NATO regulations—in case of conflicting regulations, the latter are applied with priority. Dissemination of classified information to foreign agents or powers is punishable by up to life imprisonment, if such dissemination threatens Romania's national security.

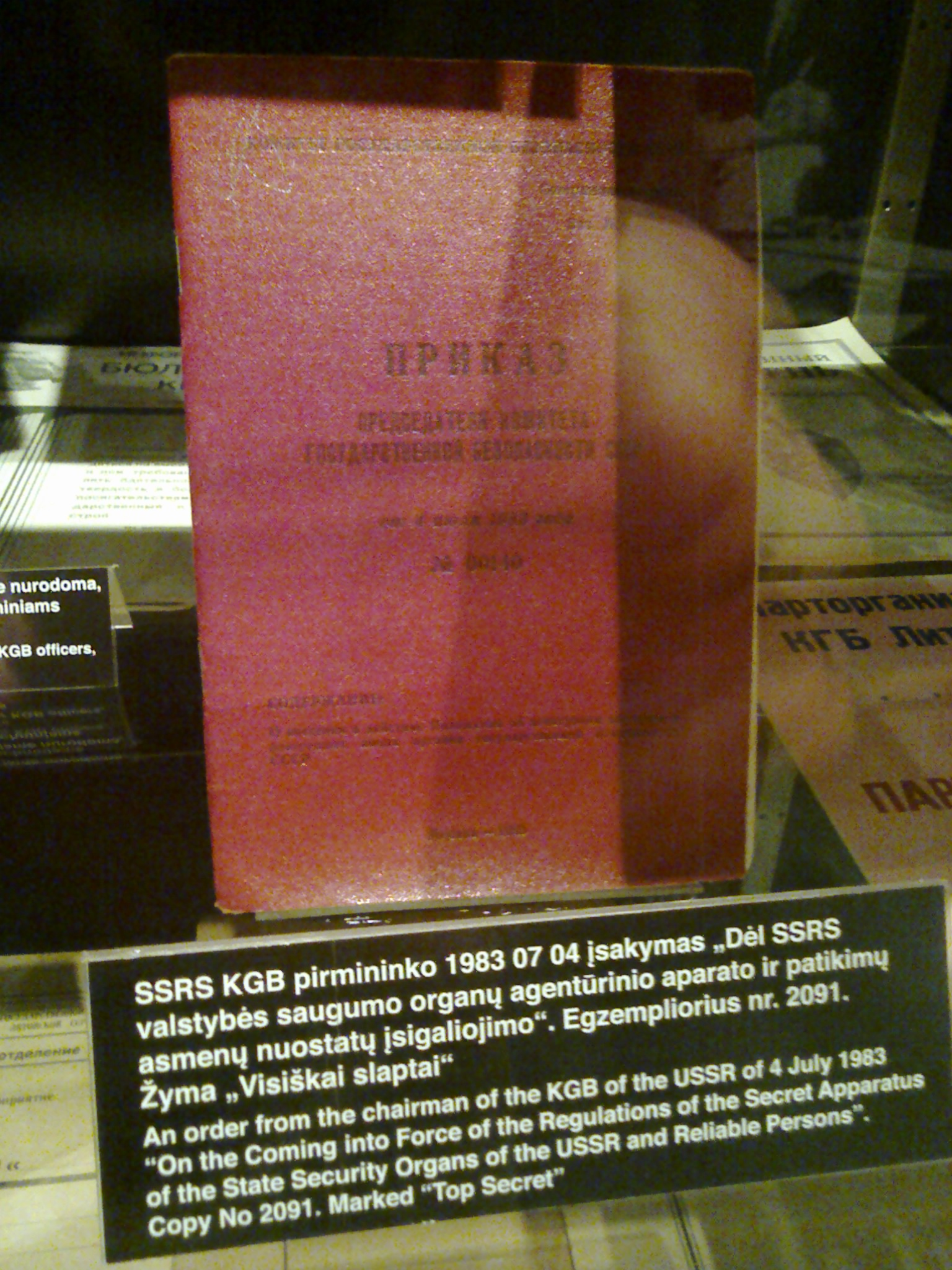
KGB regulation seen in Museum of Genocide Victims Vilnius

=== Russia ===
In the Russian Federation, a state secret (Государственная тайна) is information protected by the state on its military, foreign policy, economic, intelligence, counterintelligence, operational and investigative and other activities, dissemination of which could harm state security.

=== Sweden ===
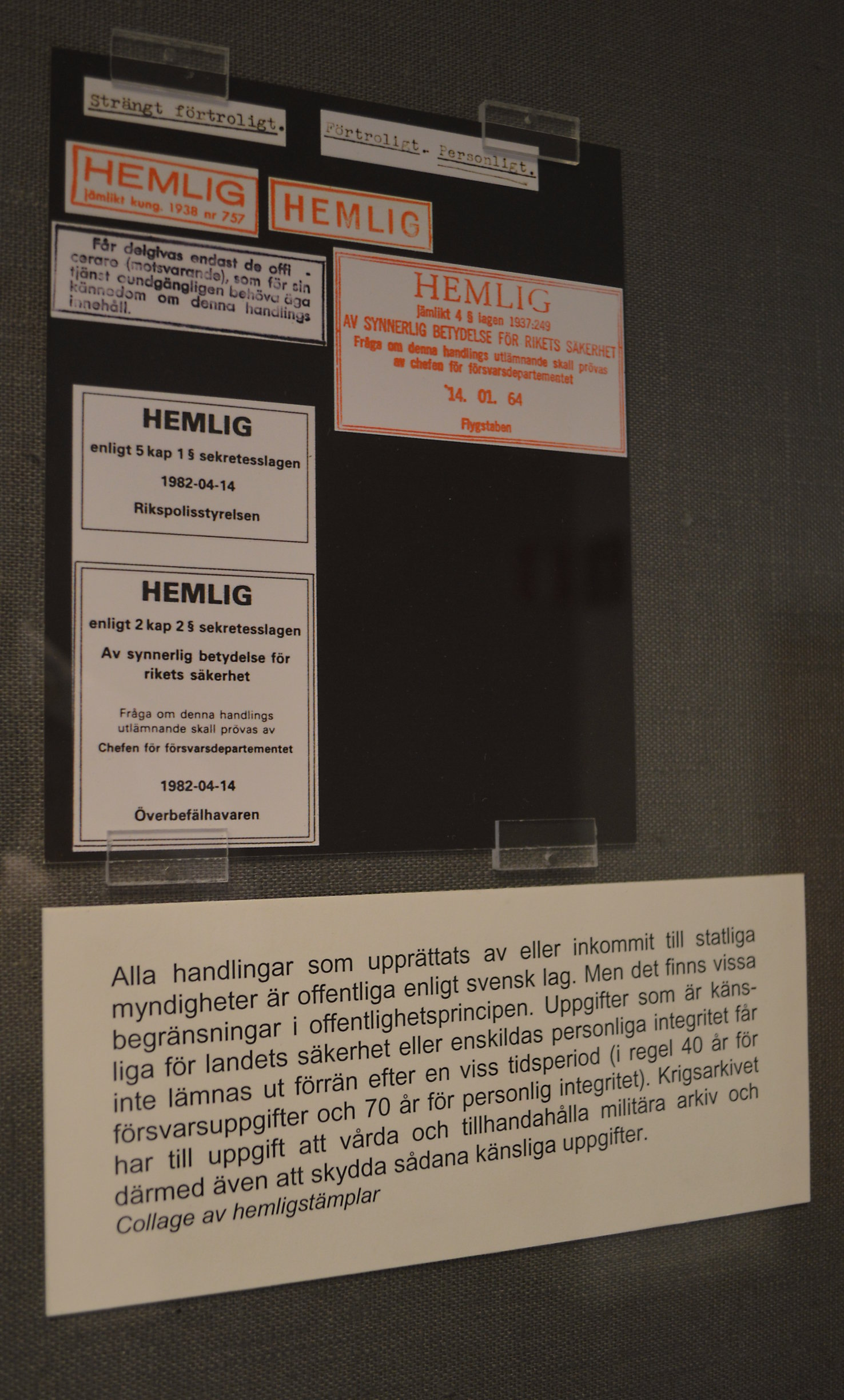
Some Swedish examples of markings attached to documents that are to be kept secret. A single frame around the text indicates Hemlig, which can be equal to either Secret, Confidential or Restricted. Double frames means Kvalificerat hemlig; that is, Top Secret.

The Swedish classification has been updated due to increased NATO/PfP cooperation. All classified defence documents will now have both a Swedish classification (Kvalificerat hemlig, Hemlig, Konfidentiell or Begränsat Hemlig), and an English classification (Top Secret, Secret, Confidential, or Restricted). The term skyddad identitet, "protected identity", is used in the case of protection of a threatened person, basically implying "secret identity", accessible only to certain members of the police force and explicitly authorised officials.

=== Switzerland ===
At the federal level, classified information in Switzerland is assigned one of three levels, which are from lowest to highest: Internal, Confidential, Secret. Respectively, these are, in German, Intern, Vertraulich, Geheim; in French, Interne, Confidentiel, Secret; in Italian, Ad Uso Interno, Confidenziale, Segreto. As in other countries, the choice of classification depends on the potential impact that the unauthorised release of the classified document would have on Switzerland, the federal authorities or the authorities of a foreign government.

According to the Ordinance on the Protection of Federal Information, information is classified as Internal if its "disclosure to unauthorised persons may be disadvantageous to national interests." Information classified as Confidential could, if disclosed, compromise "the free formation of opinions and decision-making of the Federal Assembly or the Federal Council," jeopardise national monetary/economic policy, put the population at risk or adversely affect the operations of the Swiss Armed Forces. Finally, the unauthorised release of Secret information could seriously compromise the ability of either the Federal Assembly or the Federal Council to function or impede the ability of the Federal Government or the Armed Forces to act.

=== Turkey ===
According to the related regulations in Turkey, there are four levels of document classification: çok gizli (top secret), gizli (secret), özel (confidential) and hizmete özel (restricted). The fifth is tasnif dışı, which means unclassified.

=== United Kingdom ===
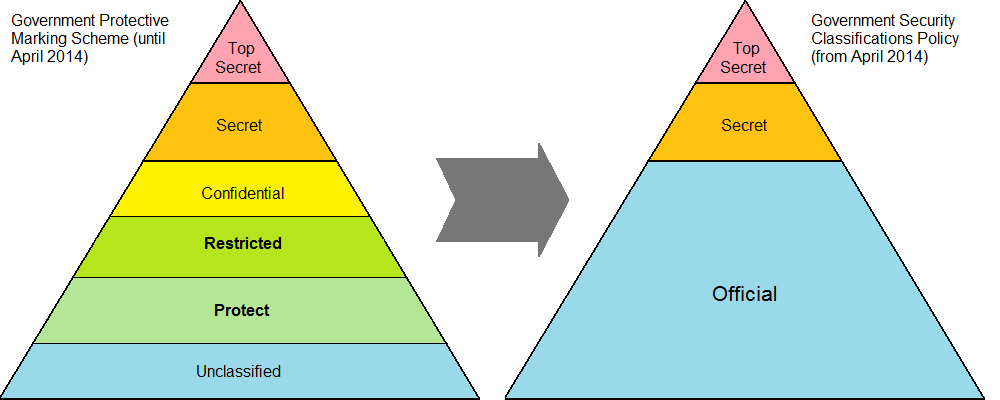
Security classifications in the UK

Until 2013, the United Kingdom used five levels of classification—from lowest to highest, they were: Protect, Restricted, Confidential, Secret and Top Secret (formerly Most Secret). The Cabinet Office provides guidance on how to protect information, including the security clearances required for personnel. Staff may be required to sign to confirm their understanding and acceptance of the Official Secrets Acts 1911 to 1989, although the Act applies regardless of signature. Protect is not in itself a security protective marking level (such as Restricted or greater), but is used to indicate information which should not be disclosed because, for instance, the document contains tax, national insurance, or other personal information.

Government documents without a classification may be marked as Unclassified or Not Protectively Marked.

This system was replaced by the Government Security Classifications Policy, which has a simpler model: Top Secret, Secret, and Official from April 2014. Official Sensitive is a security marking which may be followed by one of three authorised descriptors: Commercial, LocSen (location sensitive) or Personal. Secret and Top Secret may include a caveat such as UK Eyes Only.

Also useful is that scientific discoveries may be classified via the D-Notice system if they are deemed to have applications relevant to national security. These may later emerge when technology improves so for example the specialised processors and routing engines used in graphics cards are loosely based on top secret military chips designed for code breaking and image processing. They may or may not have safeguards built in to generate errors when specific tasks are attempted and this is invariably independent of the card's operating system.

=== United States ===
The U.S. classification system is currently established under Executive Order 13526 and has three levels of classification—Confidential, Secret, and Top Secret. The U.S. had a Restricted level during World War II but no longer does. U.S. regulations state that information received from other countries at the Restricted level should be handled as Confidential. A variety of markings are used for material that is not classified, but whose distribution is limited administratively or by other laws, e.g., For Official Use Only (FOUO), or sensitive but unclassified (SBU). The Atomic Energy Act of 1954 provides for the protection of information related to the design of nuclear weapons. The term "Restricted Data" is used to denote certain nuclear technology. Information about the storage, use or handling of nuclear material or weapons is marked "Formerly Restricted Data". These designations are used in addition to level markings (Confidential, Secret and Top Secret). Information protected by the Atomic Energy Act is protected by law and information classified under the Executive Order is protected by Executive privilege.

The U.S. government insists it is "not appropriate" for a court to question whether any document is legally classified. In the 1973 trial of Daniel Ellsberg for releasing the Pentagon Papers, the judge did not allow any testimony from Ellsberg, claiming it was "irrelevant", because the assigned classification could not be challenged. The charges against Ellsberg were ultimately dismissed after it was revealed that the government had broken the law in secretly breaking into the office of Ellsberg's psychiatrist and in tapping his telephone without a warrant. Ellsberg insists that the legal situation in the U.S. in 2014 is worse than it was in 1973, and Edward Snowden could not get a fair trial. The State Secrets Protection Act of 2008 might have given judges the authority to review such questions in camera, but the bill was not passed.

When a government agency acquires classified information through covert means, or designates a program as classified, the agency asserts "ownership" of that information and considers any public availability of it to be a violation of their ownership—even if the same information was acquired independently through "parallel reporting" by the press or others. For example, although the CIA drone program has been widely discussed in public since the early 2000s, and reporters personally observed and reported on drone missile strikes, the CIA still considers the very existence of the program to be classified in its entirety, and any public discussion of it technically constitutes exposure of classified information. "Parallel reporting" was an issue in determining what constitutes "classified" information during the Hillary Clinton email controversy when Assistant Secretary of State for Legislative Affairs Julia Frifield noted, "When policy officials obtain information from open sources, 'think tanks,' experts, foreign government officials, or others, the fact that some of the information may also have been available through intelligence channels does not mean that the information is necessarily classified."

Former government intelligence officials are usually able to retain their security clearance, but it is a privilege not a right, with the President being the grantor. The Washington Post reported in an investigation entitled "Top Secret America" that, as of 2010, "An estimated 854,000 people ... hold top-secret security clearances" in the United States.

==== Clearance ====
Clearance is a general classification, that comprises a variety of rules controlling the level of permission required to view some classified information, and how it must be stored, transmitted, and destroyed. Additionally, access is restricted on a "need to know" basis. Simply possessing a clearance does not automatically authorize the individual to view all material classified at that level or below that level. The individual must present a legitimate "need to know" in addition to the proper level of clearance.

===== NOFORN (NF) =====
The classification markings NOFORN (NF) is information may not be disseminated to any foreign government, foreign national, foreigners, international organizations or any individuals that are not citizens of the United States of America.

===== Federal Employees Only (FED ONLY) =====
The document designation classification Federal Employees Only (FED ONLY) is a limited dissemination control established by the Controlled Unclassified Information (CUI) executive. FED ONLY dissemination controls are authorized only to U.S. Government official employees, executive branch agencies, or United States armed forces of the U.S. Active Guard Reserve.

===== Federal Employees and Contractors Only (FEDCON) =====
Federal Employees and Contractors Only (FEDCON) is a limited dissemination control for authorized individuals or employees who enter a contract with the United States to perform a specific job.

===== Sensitive But Unclassified (SBU) =====
The document designation marking indicator for Sensitive But Unclassified (SBU) is information that requires special handling and limited dissemination controls that falls under category of the CUI Policy.

===== Controlled Unclassified Information (CUI) =====
Controlled Unclassified Information (CUI) is information that falls within a law, regulation, and government-wide policy that require safeguarding to be protected from unauthorized disclosure. No individual may have access to CUI information unless he or she has been granted an authorization.

==== Weapons of Mass Destruction (WMD) ====
In addition to the general risk-based classification levels, additional compartmented constraints on access exist, such as (in the U.S.) Special Intelligence (SI), which protects intelligence sources and methods, No Foreign dissemination (NoForn), which restricts dissemination to U.S. nationals, and Originator Controlled dissemination (OrCon), which ensures that the originator can track possessors of the information. Information in these compartments is usually marked with specific keywords in addition to the classification level.

Government information about nuclear weapons often has an additional marking to show it contains such information (CNWDI).

===== Declassification =====
For originally classified documents, the date of the original classification is scheduled for an automatic declassification of 10 years or 25 years, from the date of original classification. "50X1-HUM" is information that reveals the identity of a confidential human source or a human intelligence source which is exempt from scheduled automatic declassification. "50X2-WMD" is classified information exempt from automatic declassification at 10 years and 25 years that reveal information that reveals key elements and design of weapons of mass destruction assembly, production and deployment.

=== Table of equivalent classification markings in various countries ===
(State)	Top Secret	Secret	Confidential	Restricted
Albania	Teper Sekret	Sekret	Konfidencial	I Kufizuar
Argentina	Estrictamente Secreto y Confidencial Strictly Secret and Confidential	Secreto Secret	Confidencial Confidential	Reservado Reserved
Armenia	Հատուկ կարևորության Of Special Importance	Հույժ գաղտնի Top Secret	Գաղտնի; Secret	Ծառայողական օգտագործման համար For Service Use
Australia	Top Secret	Secret	Retired 2018. No equivalent level for historical classification US, French, EU, Japan "Confidential" marking to be handled as SECRET.	Protected
Austria	Streng Geheim	Geheim	Vertraulich	Eingeschränkt
Belgium	Zeer Geheim / Très Secret	Geheim / Secret	Vertrouwelijk / Confidentiel	Beperkte Verspreiding / Diffusion restreinte
Bolivia	Supersecreto or Muy Secreto	Secreto	Confidencial	Reservado
Bosnia and Herzegovina	Vrlo tajno	Tajno	Povjerljivo	Interno
Brazil	Ultrassecreto	Secreto	no equivalent (formerly Confidencial)	Reservado
Bulgaria	Strògo sèkretno Строго секретно	Sèkretno; Секретно	Poveritèlno; Поверително	Za služebno polzvàne За служебно ползване
Cambodia	Sam Ngat Bamphot	Sam Ngat Roeung	Art Kambang	Ham Kom Psay
Canada	Top Secret/Très secret	Secret/Secret	Confidential/Confidentiel	Protected A, B or C/Protégé A, B ou C
Chile	Secreto	Secreto	Reservado	Reservado
China	Juémì (绝密) Top Secret	Jīmì (机密) Highly Secret	Mìmì (秘密) Secret	Nèibù (内部) Internal
Colombia	Ultrasecreto	Secreto	Confidencial	Reserva del sumario
Costa Rica	Alto Secreto	Secreto	Confidencial	
Croatia	Vrlo tajno	Tajno	Povjerljivo	Ograničeno
Czech Republic	Přísně tajné	Tajné	Důvěrné	Vyhrazené
Denmark	Yderst Hemmeligt (YHM)	Hemmeligt (HEM)	Fortroligt (FTR)	Til Tjenestebrug (TTJ) Foreign Service: Fortroligt (thin black border)
Ecuador	Secretisimo	Secreto	Confidencial	Reservado
Egypt	Sirriy lil-Ġāyah سري للغاية	Sirriy Ǧiddan سري جداً	Khāṣ خاص	Maḥzūr محظور
El Salvador	Ultra Secreto	Secreto	Confidencial	Reservado
Estonia	Täiesti salajane	Salajane	Konfidentsiaalne	Piiratud
Ethiopia	ብርቱ ምስጢር	ምስጢር	ጥብቅ	ክልክል
European Union (EU)	Tres Secret UE / EU Top Secret	Secret UE / EU Secret	Confidentiel UE / EU Confidential	Restreint UE / EU Restricted
European Union (Western) (WEU)	Focal top secret	WEU Secret	WEU Confidential	WEU Restricted
Euratom	EURA Top Secret	EURA Secret	EURA Confidential	EURA Restricted
Finland (Note: Finland uses also uses the label Salassa pidettävä, "to be kept secret" for information that is not classified but must not be revealed on some other basis than national security. (E.g. privacy, trade secrets etc.))	Erittäin salainen (TL I)	Salainen (TL II)	Luottamuksellinen (TL III)	Käyttö rajoitettu (TL IV)
France	Très secret	Secret	Secret	Diffusion restreinte
Germany	Streng Geheim Top Secret	Geheim Secret	VS-Vertraulich Confidential	VS-Nur Für Den Dienstgebrauch For Official Use Only
Greece	Άκρως Απόρρητον Top Secret	Απόρρητον Secret	Εμπιστευτικόν Confidential	Περιορισμένης; Χρήσης Limited Use
Guatemala	Alto Secreto	Secreto	Confidencial	Reservado
Haiti	Top Secret	Secret	Confidential	Reserve
Honduras	Super Secreto	Secreto	Confidencial	Reservado
Hong Kong	Top Secret, 高度機密	Secret, 機密	Confidential, 保密	Restricted, 內部文件/限閱文件
Hungary	Szigorúan Titkos Top Secret	Titkos Secret	Bizalmas Confidential	Korlátozott Terjesztésű Restricted Distribution
India (Hindi)	परम गुप्त (Param Gupt)	गुप्त (Gupt)	गोपनीय (Gopniya)	प्रतिबंधित/सीमित (Pratibandhit/seemit)
India (English)	Top Secret	Secret	Confidential	Restricted
Indonesia	Sangat Rahasia	Rahasia	Rahasia Dinas	Terbatas
Iran	Bekoli-Serri بکلی سری	Serri سری	Kheili-Mahrmaneh خیلی محرمانه	Mahrmaneh محرمانه
Iraq	Sirriy lil-Ġāyah سري للغاية	Sirriy سري	Khāṣ خاص	Maḥdūod محدود
Iceland	Algert Leyndarmál Absolute Secret	Leyndarmál Secret	Trúnaðarmál Confidential	Þjónustuskjal Service Document
Ireland (Irish language)	An-sicréideach	Sicréideach	Rúnda	Srianta
Israel	Sodi Beyoter סודי ביותר	Sodi סודי	Shamur שמור	Mugbal מוגבל
Italy	Segretissimo	Segreto	Riservatissimo	Riservato
Japan	Kimitsu (機密)	Gokuhi (極秘)	Hi (秘)	Toriatsukaichuui (取り扱い注意)
Jordan	Maktūm Ǧiddan مكتوم جداً	Maktūm مكتوم	Sirriy سري	Maḥdūd محدود
South Korea	1(Il)-geup Bimil, 1급 비밀, 一級秘密 Class 1 Secret	2(I)-geup Bimil, 2급 비밀, 二級秘密 Class 2 Secret	3(Sam)-geup Bimil, 3급 비밀, 三級秘密 Class 3 Secret	Daeoebi, 대외비, 對外秘 Confidential
Laos	Lup Sood Gnod	Kuam Lup	Kuam Lap	Chum Kut Kon Arn
Latvia	Sevišķi slepeni	Slepeni	Konfidenciāli	Dienesta vajadzībām
Lebanon	Tres Secret	Secret	Confidentiel	
Lithuania	Visiškai Slaptai	Slaptai	Konfidencialiai	Riboto Naudojimo
Malaysia	Rahsia Besar	Rahsia	Sulit	Terhad
Mexico	Ultra Secreto	Secreto	Confidencial	Restringido
Montenegro	Strogo Tajno	Tajno	Povjerljivo	Interno
Netherlands	STG. Zeer Geheim	STG. Geheim	STG. Confidentieel	Departementaal Vertrouwelijk
New Zealand	Top Secret	Secret	Confidential	Restricted
Nicaragua	Alto Secreto	Secreto	Confidencial	Reservado
Norway	STRENGT HEMMELIG	HEMMELIG	KONFIDENSIELT	BEGRENSET
Pakistan (Urdu)	Intahai Khufia انتہائی خفیہ	Khufia خفیہ	Sikha-e-Raz صیخہ راز	Barai Mahdud Taqsim محدود تقسیم
Pakistan (English)	Top Secret	Secret	Confidential	Restricted
Paraguay	Secreto	Secreto	Confidencial	Reservado
Peru	Estrictamente Secreto	Secreto	Confidencial	Reservado
Philippines (English) Philippines (Tagalog)	Top Secret Matinding Lihim	Secret Mahigpit na Lihim	Confidential Lihim	Restricted Ipinagbabawal
Poland	Ściśle tajne	Tajne	Poufne	Zastrzeżone
Portugal	Muito Secreto	Secreto	Confidencial	Reservado
Romania	Strict Secret de Importanță Deosebită Strict Secret of Special Importance	Strict Secret	Secret	Secret de serviciu Secret for Service Use
Russia	Особой важности (вариант: Совершенно Секретно (Sovershenno Sekretno)) Of Special Importance (variant: Completely Secret)	Совершенно секретно (вариант: Секретно (Sekretno)) Completely Secret (variant: Secret)	Секретно (вариант: Не подлежит оглашению (Конфиденциально) (Ne podlezhit oglasheniyu (Konfidentsial'no)) Secret (variant: Not To Be Disclosed (Confidential))	Для Служебного Пользования (ДСП) (Dlya Sluzhebnogo Pol'zovaniya) For Official Use
Saudi Arabia	Saudi Top Secret	Saudi Very Secret	Saudi Secret	Saudi Restricted
Serbia	Cyrillic: Државна тајна Latin: Državna tajna State Secret	Cyrillic: Строго поверљиво Latin: Strogo poverljivo Strictly Confidential	Cyrillic: Поверљиво; Latin: Poverljivo Confidential	Cyrillic: Интерно; Latin: Interno Internal
Singapore	Top Secret	Secret	Confidential	Restricted
Somalia	Sir Muhiim ah	Sir Gooniya	Xog Qarsoon	Qarsoon
Slovak Republic	Prísne tajné	Tajné	Dôverné	Vyhradené
Slovenia	Strogo tajno	Tajno	Zaupno	Interno
Spain	Secreto	Reservado	Confidencial	Difusión Limitada
Sri Lanka	අති රහස්‍ය	රහස්‍ය	රහසිගත	සීමාන්විත
Sweden	Kvalificerat hemlig (KH); Hemlig/Top Secret (H/TS)	Hemlig (H); Hemlig/Secret (H/S)	Konfidentiell; Hemlig/Confidential (H/C)	Begränsat hemlig; Hemlig/Restricted (H/R)
Switzerland		Geheim / Secret	Vertraulich / Confidentiel	Intern / Interne
Taiwan (Republic of China)	Top Secret (絕對機密)	Secret (極機密)	Confidential (機密)	no direct equivalent
Tanzania (Swahili)	Siri Kuu	Siri	Stiri	Imezuiliwa
Thailand	Lap thi sut (ลับที่สุด) Most Secret	Lap mak (ลับมาก) Very Secret	Lap (ลับ) Secret	Pok pit (ปกปิด) Restricted
Turkey	Çok Gizli Top Secret	Gizli Secret	Özel Confidential	Hizmete Özel Restricted
South Africa (English)	Top Secret	Secret	Confidential	Restricted
South Africa (Afrikaans)	Uiters Geheim	Geheim	Vertroulik	Beperk
Ukraine	Особливої важливості	Цілком таємно	Таємно	Для службового користування
United Kingdom	Top Secret (until 1942: Most Secret)	Secret	(formerly Confidential) abolished in 2014	Official-Sensitive (formerly Restricted)
United States	Top Secret	Secret	Confidential	no direct equivalent
Uruguay	Ultra Secreto	Secreto	Confidencial	Reservado
Vietnam	Tuyệt mật	Tối mật	Tài liệu mật	Hạn chế phổ biến
Table notes: Table source: US Department of Defense (January 1995). "National Industrial Security Program - Operating Manual (DoD 5220.22-M)" (PDF). pp. B1 - B3 (PDF pages:121–123 ). Archived (PDF) from the original on 27 July 2019.

== See also ==
- Cloak and dagger
- Economic Espionage Act of 1996 (U.S.)
- Espionage
- Espionage Act of 1917 (U.S.)
- Eyes only
- Five Eyes
- Golden Shield Project
- Government Security Classifications Policy (UK)
- Illegal number
- Information security
- Official Secrets Act (UK, India, Ireland, Malaysia, New Zealand)
- Security of Information Act (Canada)
- State Secrets Privilege (US)
- Wassenaar Arrangement
- WikiLeaks
- UKUSA Agreement
