= Nuclear weapons in popular culture =

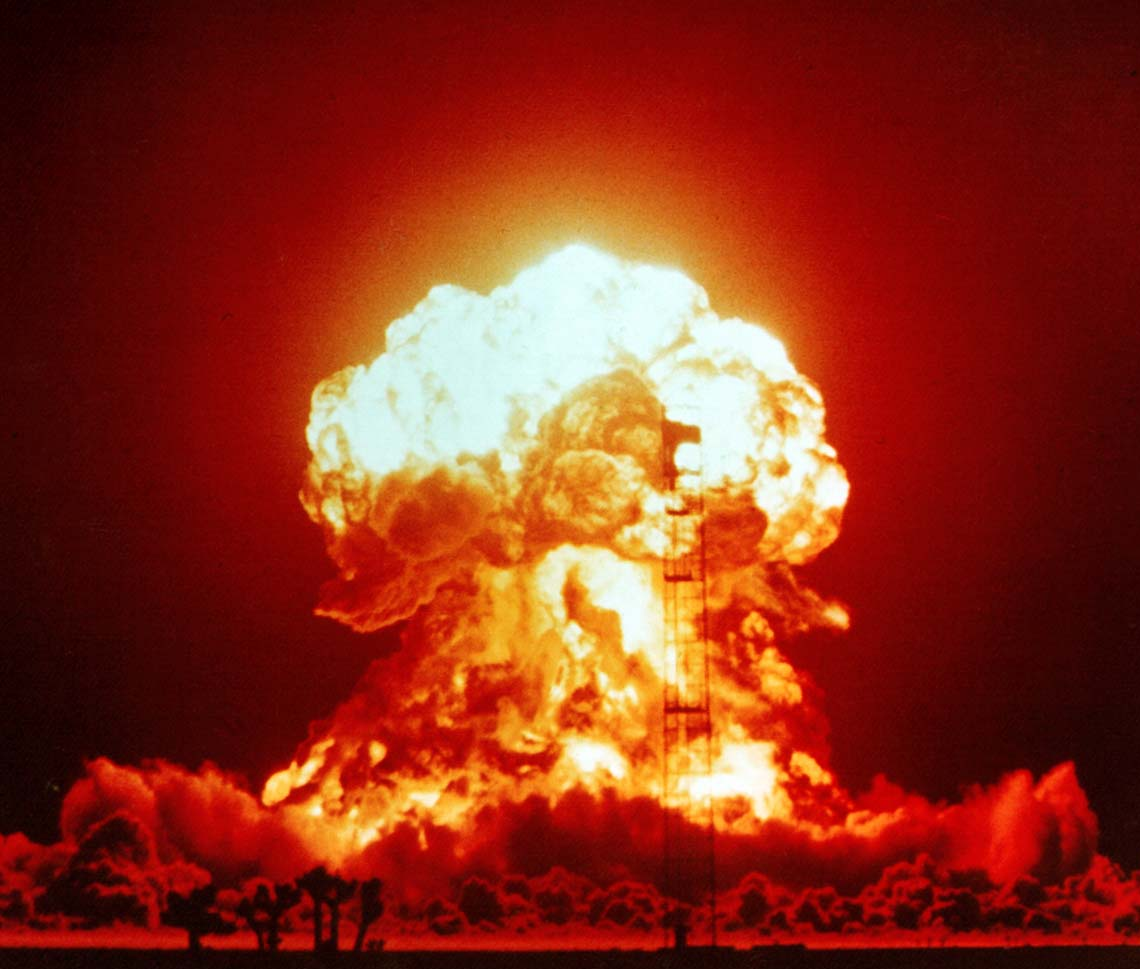
A nuclear fireball lights up the night in a United States nuclear test.

Since their first use in warfare in August 1945, nuclear weapons and their potential effects have been a recurring motif in popular culture, to the extent that the decades of the Cold War are often referred to as the "Atomic Age".

== Historical overview ==
Nuclear weapons were first developed during the Second World War as part of the Manhattan Project. The first use of nuclear weapons was used in 1945 when the atomic bombings of Hiroshima and Nagasaki killed between 150,000 and 246,000 people. The Cold War was partly defined by the subsequent nuclear arms race for weapons.

== Images of nuclear weapons ==
The now-familiar peace symbol was originally a specifically anti-nuclear weapons icon.

The atomic bombings of Hiroshima and Nagasaki ushered in the "atomic age", and the bleak pictures of the bombed-out cities released shortly after the end of World War II became symbols of the power and destruction of the new weapons (the first pictures released were only from distances, and did not contain any human bodies—such pictures would only be released in later years).

The first pictures released of a nuclear explosion—the blast from the Trinity test—focused on the fireball itself; later pictures would focus primarily on the mushroom cloud that followed. After the United States began a regular program of nuclear testing in the late 1940s, continuing through the 1950s (and matched by the Soviet Union), the mushroom cloud has served as a symbol of the weapons themselves.

Pictures of nuclear weapons themselves (the actual casings) were not made public until 1960, and even those were only mock-ups of the "Fat Man" and "Little Boy" weapons dropped on Japan—not the more powerful weapons developed more recently. Diagrams of the general principles of operation of thermonuclear weapons have been available in very general terms since at least 1969 in at least two encyclopedia articles, and open literature research into inertial confinement fusion has been at least richly suggestive of how the "secondary" and "inter" stages of thermonuclear weapons work.

In general, however, the design of nuclear weapons has been the most closely guarded secret until long after the secrets had been independently developed—or stolen—by all the major powers and a number of lesser ones. It is generally possible to trace US knowledge of foreign progress in nuclear weapons technology by reading the US Department of Energy document "Restricted Data Declassification Decisions—1946 to the Present" (although some nuclear weapons design data have been reclassified since concern about proliferation of nuclear weapons to "nth countries" increased in the late 1970s).

However, two controversial publications breached this silence in ways that made many in the US and allied nuclear weapons community very anxious.

Former nuclear weapons designer Theodore Taylor described how terrorists could, without using any classified information at all, design a working fission nuclear weapon to journalist John McPhee, who published this information in the best-selling book The Curve of Binding Energy in 1974.

In 1979 the US Department of Energy sued to suppress the publication of an article by Howard Morland in The Progressive magazine detailing design information on thermonuclear and fission nuclear weapons he was able to glean in conversations with officials at several DoE contractor plants active in manufacture of nuclear weapons components. Ray Kidder, a nuclear weapon designer testifying for Morland, identified several open literature sources for the information Morland repeated in his article, while aviation historian Chuck Hansen produced a similar document for US Senator Charles Percy. Morland and The Progressive won the case, and Morland published a book on his journalistic research for the article, the trial, and a technical appendix in which he "corrected" what he felt were false assumptions in his original article about the design of thermonuclear weapons in his book, The Secret That Exploded. The concepts in Morland's book are widely acknowledged in other popular-audience descriptions of the inner workings of thermonuclear weapons.

During the 1950s, many countries developed large civil-defense programs designed to aid the populace in the event of nuclear warfare. These generally included drills for evacuation to fallout shelters, popularized through popular media such as the US film Duck and Cover. These drills, with their images of eerily empty streets and the activity of hiding from a nuclear bomb under a schoolroom desk, would later become symbols of the seemingly inescapable and common fate created by such weapons. Some Americans built back-yard fallout shelters, which would provide little protection from a direct hit, but would keep out wind-blown fallout, for a few days or weeks (Switzerland, which never acquired nuclear weapons, although it had the technological sophistication to do so long before Pakistan or North Korea, has built nuclear blast shelters that would protect most of its population from a nuclear war.)

After the development of hydrogen bombs in the 1950s, and especially after the massive and widely publicized Castle Bravo test accident by the United States in 1954, which spread nuclear fallout over a large area and resulted in the death of at least one Japanese fisherman, the idea of a "limited" or "survivable" nuclear war became increasingly replaced by a perception that nuclear war meant the potentially instant end of all civilization: in fact, the explicit strategy of the nuclear powers was called Mutual Assured Destruction. Nuclear weapons became synonymous with apocalypse, and as a symbol this resonated through the culture of nations with freedom of the press. Several popular novels—such as Alas, Babylon and On the Beach—portrayed the aftermath of nuclear war. Several science-fiction novels, such as A Canticle for Leibowitz, explored the long-term consequences. Stanley Kubrick's film Dr. Strangelove or: How I Learned to Stop Worrying and Love the Bomb satirically portrayed the events and the thinking that could begin a nuclear war.

Nuclear weapons are also one of the main targets of peace organizations. The CND (Campaign for Nuclear Disarmament) was one of the main organisations campaigning against the "Bomb". Its symbol, a combination of the semaphore symbols for "N" (nuclear) and "D" (disarmament), entered modern popular culture as an icon of peace.

A limited number of Indian films depicting nuclear weapons and technology have been made and these mostly show nuclear weapons in a negative light especially in the hand of non-state actors. Atom Bomb (1947) by Homi Wadia, one of the first Indian films involving nuclear technology, is about a man with enhanced physical strength due to the effects of a nuclear weapons test. Indian films involving non-state actors and nuclear weapons include Agent Vinod (1977) by Deepak Bahry and a 2012 film of the same name by Sriram Raghavan, Vikram (1986) by Rajasekhar, Mr. India (1987) by Shekhar Kapoor, Tirangaa (1993) by Mehul Kumar, The Hero: Love Story of a Spy (2003) by Anil Sharma, Fanaa (2006) by Kunal Kohli, and Tiger Zinda Hai (2017) by Ali Abbas Zafar. Other Indian films covering nuclear weapons include Hava Aney Dey (2004) by Partho Sen-Gupta about a future nuclear war between India and Pakistan and Parmanu: The Story of Pokhran (2018) by Abhishek Sharma – the first nuclear historical film in India about the Pokhran-II Indian nuclear weapons tests. Sacred Games, an Indian Netflix series based on the novel of the same name, involves the acquirement of a nuclear bomb by an apocalyptic cult who plans to blow it up in Mumbai.

== See also ==
- Atomic age
- List of apocalyptic and post-apocalyptic fiction
- List of films about nuclear issues
- List of nuclear holocaust fiction
- Nuclear War (card game)
- Nuclear holocaust
- Nuclear optimism
- World War III in popular culture
