= Prior restraint =

Suppressing certain types of information before the fact

Prior restraint (also referred to as prior censorship or pre-publication censorship) is censorship imposed, usually by a government or institution, on expression, that prohibits particular instances of expression. It is in contrast to censorship that establishes general subject matter restrictions and reviews a particular instance of expression only after the expression has taken place.

In some countries (e.g., United States, Argentina) prior restraint by the government is forbidden, subject to exceptions, by their respective constitutions.

Prior restraint can be effected in a number of ways. For example, the exhibition of works of art or a movie may require a license from a government authority (sometimes referred to as a classification board or censorship board) before it can be published, and the failure or refusal to grant a license is a form of censorship as is the revoking of a license. It can take the form of a legal injunction or government order prohibiting the publication of a specific document. Sometimes, a government or other party becomes aware of a forthcoming publication on a particular subject and seeks to prevent it: to halt ongoing publication and prevent its resumption. These injunctions are considered prior restraint because potential future publications are stopped in advance. It can also take the form of a (usually secret) policy imposed by a commercial corporation upon its employees, requiring them to obtain written permission to publish a given written work, even one authored outside of work hours produced using their own computing resources.

Common justifications given for prior restraints include avoiding exposure of military secrets, protecting victims of involuntary pornography or rape, or to protect the integrity of a judicial proceeding.

== Anglo-American legal tradition ==
=== Blackstone and early views ===
In William Blackstone's Commentaries "Freedom of the Press" is defined as the right to be free from prior restraints. According to Blackstone, a person should not be punished for speaking or writing the truth with good motives and for justifiable ends. Truth alone, however, was not considered a sufficient justification, if published with bad motives.

The liberty of the press is indeed essential to the nature of a free state; but this consists in laying no previous restraints upon publications, and not in freedom from censure for criminal matter when published. Every freeman has an undoubted right to lay what sentiments he pleases before the public; to forbid this, is to destroy the freedom of the press; but if he publishes what is improper, mischievous or illegal, he must take the consequence of his own temerity. (4 Bl. Com. 151, 152.)

This view was the common legal understanding at the time the U.S. Constitution was adopted. Only later have the concepts of freedom of speech and the press been extended (in the United States, the United Kingdom, and other countries sharing their legal tradition) to protect honest error, or truth even if published for questionable reasons.

=== Judicial view ===
Prior restraint is often considered a particularly oppressive form of censorship in Anglo-American jurisprudence because it prevents the restricted material from being heard or distributed at all. Other forms of restrictions on expression (such as actions for libel or criminal libel, slander, defamation, and contempt of court) implement criminal or civil sanctions only after the offending material has been published. While such sanctions might lead to a chilling effect, legal commentators argue that at least such actions do not directly impoverish the marketplace of ideas. Prior restraint, on the other hand, takes an idea or material completely out of the marketplace. Thus it is often considered to be the most extreme form of censorship. The United States Supreme Court expressed this view in Nebraska Press Assn. v. Stuart by noting:

The thread running through all these cases is that prior restraints on speech and publication are the most serious and the least tolerable infringement on First Amendment rights. A criminal penalty or a judgment in a defamation case is subject to the whole panoply of protections afforded by deferring the impact of the judgment until all avenues of appellate review have been exhausted. Only after judgment has become final, correct or otherwise, does the law's sanction become fully operative.

A prior restraint, by contrast and by definition, has an immediate and irreversible sanction. If it can be said that a threat of criminal or civil sanctions after publication "chills" speech, prior restraint "freezes" it at least for the time.

Most of the early struggles for freedom of the press were against forms of prior restraint. Thus prior restraint came to be looked upon with a particular horror, and Anglo-American courts became particularly unwilling to approve it, when they might approve other forms of press restriction.

== United States ==
=== Near v. Minnesota ===
The first notable case in which the United States Supreme Court ruled on a prior restraint issue was Near v. Minnesota, 283 U.S. 697 (1931). In that case the Court held prior restraints to be unconstitutional, except in extremely limited circumstances such as national security issues. The ruling came about after Jay Near's newspaper, The Saturday Press, a small local paper that ran countless exposés of Minneapolis's elected officials' alleged illicit activities, including gambling, racketeering, and graft, was silenced by the Minnesota Gag Law of 1925, also known as The Public Nuisance Law. Near's critics called his paper a scandal sheet, and alleged that he tried to extort money by threatening to publish attacks on officials and others. In the Near case the Court held that the state had no power to enjoin the publication of the paper in this way – that any such action would be unconstitutional under the First Amendment. It wrote:

If we cut through mere details of procedure, the operation and effect of the statute in substance is that public authorities may bring the owner or publisher of a newspaper or periodical before a judge upon a charge of conducting a business of publishing scandalous and defamatory matter — in particular that the matter consists of charges against public officers of official dereliction — and, unless the owner or publisher is able and disposed to bring competent evidence to satisfy the judge that the charges are true and are published with good motives and for justifiable ends, his newspaper or periodical is suppressed and further publication is made punishable as a contempt. This is of the essence of censorship.

And

The statute in question cannot be justified by reason of the fact that the publisher is permitted to show, before injunction issues, that the matter published is true and is published with good motives and for justifiable ends. ... it would be but a step to a complete system of censorship. ... The preliminary freedom, by virtue of the very reason for its existence, does not depend, as this court has said, on proof of truth.

— Patterson v. Colorado, 205 U.S. 454, 462.

This was an extension of the Court's earlier views, which had followed Blackstone. In Patterson v. Colorado, the Court had written: "In the first place, the main purpose of such constitutional provisions is 'to prevent all such previous restraints upon publications as had been practiced by other governments,' and they do not prevent the subsequent punishment of such as may be deemed contrary to the public welfare." (quoted in the Near decision). The Near decision was the first time that it was held that even alleged untruth or malicious intent would not be sufficient reason to impose prior restraints.

Near was decided 5–4. The four dissenting justices strongly approved of the "gag law", and felt that the nature of the articles in The Saturday Press, including their recurrent antisemitism, their frequent (allegedly false) accusations of official misconduct, and their disrespectful and confrontational tone, made them unworthy of protection. But this view did not prevail.

After the Near decision, newspapers had a clearly established freedom to criticize public officials without fear of retribution, even when charges made by the papers could not be proven in court. Newspapers could still be punished through libel laws, if they published material found to be untrue. The "Gag Law" was unique in the United States at that time, and even in Minnesota had only been used on two occasions. Indeed, the Court commented on the unusual nature of the proceeding in its decision.

The Court in Near left open the possibility of prior restraints for various exceptional purposes, such as national security, control of obscenity, and the like. It wrote:

... the protection even as to previous restraint is not absolutely unlimited. But the limitation has been recognized only in exceptional cases. 'When a nation is at war many things that might be said in time of peace are such a hindrance to its effort that their utterance will not be endured so long as men fight and that no Court could regard them as protected by any constitutional right.' (Schenck v. United States, 249 U.S. 47, 52, 39 S. Ct. 247, 249). No one would question but that a government might prevent actual obstruction to its recruiting service or the publication of the sailing dates of transports or the number and location of troops. On similar grounds, the primary requirements of decency may be enforced against obscene publications. The security of the community life may be protected against incitements to acts of violence and the overthrow by force of orderly government.

Near's dicta suggest that, while a constitutional prior restraint can exist, the high burden of proof necessary to demonstrate constitutionality results in a presumption of invalidity, and the government bears the burden of showing the restraint's constitutionality.

In a later case (Nebraska Press Ass'n v. Stuart), the Court wrote:

The principles enunciated in Near were so universally accepted that the precise issue did not come before us again until Organization for a Better Austin v. Keefe, 402 U.S. 415 (1971). There the state courts had enjoined the petitioners from picketing or passing out literature of any kind in a specified area. Noting the similarity to Near vs. Minnesota, a unanimous Court held:

Here, as in that case, the injunction operates, not to redress alleged private wrongs, but to suppress, on the basis of previous publications, distribution of literature 'of any kind' in a city of 18,000.

. ... .

Any prior restraint on expression comes to this Court with a 'heavy presumption' against its constitutional validity. Carroll v. Princess Anne, 393 U.S. 175, 181 (1968); Bantam Books, Inc. v. Sullivan, 372 U.S. 58, 70 (1963). Respondent thus carries a heavy burden of showing justification for the imposition of such a restraint.

This shows the strong later acceptance of what had been a disputed decision when it was first handed down.

=== Kinney v. Barnes ===
In the 2012 case of Kinney v. Barnes, Kinney, a legal recruiter, was the subject of inflammatory comments on the website of the company who previously employed him. The company claimed he received extra incentives on the job causing his termination. Kinney filed a defamation suit seeking retraction of the comments and a permanent injunction against any similar future comments being made. The Supreme Court of Texas ruling specifically addressed whether future comments could be barred and whether this would constitute prior restraint. (Note: For the purpose of the case being examined, the court assumed that the already posted comments were defamatory and could be removed (though whether they were defamatory had not yet been proven).) Although the court ruled that the statements posted which were judged to be defamatory could be removed, they did not prohibit similar speech from being posted online at a later time. They reasoned that this would constitute prior restraint and risk producing a chilling effect. The court reasoned, in keeping with a prior decision (Hajek v. Bill Mowbray Motors, Inc., 647 S.W.2d 253, 255 (Tex. 1983)), that the appropriate remedy to defamatory speech was penalization of "what is wrongfully spoken" rather "denial of the right to speak".

=== Marek v. Phi Theta Kappa ===
In 2025, a Texas district court issued a temporary restraining order preventing author Toni Marek from distributing a manuscript critical of the honor society Phi Theta Kappa. The order was sought in the case Marek v. Phi Theta Kappa. Following a hearing, the court dissolved the temporary restraining order and denied the request for a temporary injunction.

=== Wartime censorship ===
During World War I, and to a greater extent during World War II, war correspondents accompanied military forces, and their reports were subject to advance censorship to preserve military secrets. The extent of such censorship was not generally challenged, and no major court case arose from this issue. In later conflicts the degree to which war reporting was subject to censorship varied, and in some cases it has been alleged that the censorship was as much political as military in purpose. This was particularly true during the Vietnam War and the 1983 invasion of Grenada.

=== Pentagon Papers case ===
In the Pentagon Papers case (New York Times Co. v. United States, 403 U.S. 713 (1971)), the Nixon administration sought to enjoin The New York Times and The Washington Post newspapers from publishing excerpts from a top-secret United States Department of Defense history of the United States involvement in the Vietnam War from 1945 to 1971. The government tried to use the "national security" exception that had been suggested in the Near decision. The Supreme Court struck down the injunctions. However, the decision was fragmented, with nine separate opinions being filed in the case. It was not clear at the time what the effect would be on future prior restraint cases.

=== H-bomb article cases ===
==== Scientific American ====
On March 15, 1950 Scientific American magazine published an article by Hans Bethe about thermonuclear fusion, the mechanism by which stars generate energy and emit electromagnetic radiation (light, etc.). Fusion is also the process which makes the hydrogen bomb (H-bomb) possible. The AEC (Atomic Energy Commission) ordered publication stopped. Several thousand copies of the printed magazine were destroyed, and the article was published with some text removed at the direction of the AEC. At this time there existed in the United States no workable design for a hydrogen bomb (the Teller–Ulam design would not be developed for another year), but the U.S. was engaged in a crash program to develop one. Gerard Piel, the publisher of Scientific American, complained that the AEC was "suppressing information which the American People need in order to form intelligent judgments". Bethe, however, declined to support this complaint, and the suppression of the unedited version of the article was never litigated.

==== The Progressive ====
In February 1979, an anti-nuclear activist named Howard Morland drafted an article for The Progressive magazine, entitled "The H-Bomb Secret: To Know How is to Ask Why". The article was an attempt by Morland to publish what he thought the "H-Bomb Secret" was (the Teller–Ulam design), derived from various unclassified sources and informal interviews with scientists and plant workers. Through a number of complicated circumstances, the Department of Energy attempted to enjoin its publication, alleging that the article contained sensitive technical information which was (1) probably derived from classified sources, or (2) became a classified source when compiled in a correct way, even if it were derived from unclassified sources, based on the "born secret" provisions of the 1954 Atomic Energy Act. A preliminary injunction was granted against the article's publication, and Morland and the magazine appealed (United States v. The Progressive, et al.). After a lengthy set of hearings (one in camera, another open to the public), and attracting considerable attention as a "freedom of the press" case, the government dropped its charges after it claimed the case became moot when another bomb speculator (Chuck Hansen) published his own views on the "secret" (many commentators speculated that they were afraid the Atomic Energy Act would be overturned under such scrutiny). The article was duly published in The Progressive (in the November 1979 issue) six months after it was originally scheduled, and remains available in libraries. (As an aside, Morland himself decided that he did not have the secret, and published a "corrected" version a month later.)

=== Judicial gag orders ===
Frequently a court will impose advance restrictions on lawyers, parties, and on the press in reporting of trials, particularly criminal trials. These restrictions are intended to protect the right to a fair trial, and to avoid interference with the judicial process. Nonetheless, they are a form of prior restraint, and the press in particular has often objected to such orders.

In Nebraska Press Assn. v. Stuart, 427 U.S. 539 (1976), the United States Supreme Court overturned such a "gag order". It ruled that alternative methods to help ensure a fair trial, short of prior restraints, might have been used, and that it was not all clear, under the circumstances, that the gag order would have the desired effect even if upheld. It also made a particular point of asserting that orders restricting reporting on events that occur in open court are not permissible. It wrote:

To the extent that this order prohibited the reporting of evidence adduced at the open preliminary hearing, it plainly violated settled principles: '[T]here is nothing that proscribes the press from reporting events that transpire in the courtroom.' Sheppard v. Maxwell, (384 U.S., at 362–363).

The Court's conclusion in this case reaffirmed its general opposition to prior restraints, and indicated that judicial gag orders would be sustained only in exceptional cases. It wrote:

Our analysis ends as it began, with a confrontation between prior restraint imposed to protect one vital constitutional guarantee and the explicit command of another that the freedom to speak and publish shall not be abridged. We reaffirm that the guarantees of freedom of expression are not an absolute prohibition under all circumstances, but the barriers to prior restraint remain high and the presumption against its use continues intact.

In the United Kingdom judicial gag orders are much more frequently employed, and the strong prejudice against them reflected in the above quote does not seem to be felt by British courts. Other countries also employ such orders more freely than the United States does.

=== DeCSS case ===
In October 1999 the Motion Picture Association of America (MPAA) learned of the availability on the Internet of DeCSS, a program that allowed people to view the content of DVDs using computers that lacked commercial DVD players, bypassing the encryption system known as the Content Scramble System (CSS) generally used on commercial DVDs. The MPAA responded by sending out a number of cease and desist letters to web site operators who posted the software. In January 2000, a lawsuit was filed against the publisher of the magazine 2600: The Hacker Quarterly, and others. This case is known as Universal v. Reimerdes, 111 F. Supp.2d 294 (S.D.N.Y. 2000).

The suit asked for an injunction under the U.S. Digital Millennium Copyright Act (DMCA) prohibiting the 2600 site from posting the DeCSS code. It also asked for a prohibition on linking to other sites that posted the code.

The injunction was issued and sustained in an appeal to the U.S. Court of Appeals for the Second Circuit and the constitutionality of the DMCA was upheld. The district court wrote that the computer code "... does more, in other words, than convey a message" and that "... it has a distinctly functional, non-speech aspect in addition to reflecting the thoughts of the programmers." The appeals court later wrote that "Under the circumstances amply shown by the record, the injunction's linking prohibition validly regulates the Appellants' opportunity instantly to enable anyone anywhere to gain unauthorized access to copyrighted movies on DVDs" thus upholding the injunction against publishing links to the DeCSS code in these circumstances.

The appeals court did consider the prior restraint and free expression issues, but treated the DeCSS program primarily as a means of evading copyright protection, and under that theory, held that the 2600 site could be permanently enjoined from posting the DeCSS code, and from linking to sites that posted it in an attempt to make the code available. The case was not taken to the Supreme Court.

=== Theater and motion pictures ===
There is a long history of prior restraints on the theater; in the United Kingdom stage plays still required a license until 1968. This attitude was early transferred to motion pictures, and prior restraints were retained for films long after they had been dropped for other forms of publication: in some jurisdictions, a film had to be submitted to a film censor board in order to be approved for showing.

The United States Supreme Court upheld the use of a board of censors in Mutual Film Corporation v. Industrial Commission of Ohio, 236 U.S. 230 (1915) by deciding that the First Amendment did not apply to motion pictures. The power of such boards was weakened when the Supreme Court later overruled itself and decided that the First Amendment does apply to motion pictures. In the case of Joseph Burstyn, Inc. v. Wilson, 343 U.S. 495 (1952), the court decided that giving the power to forbid or restrict a film to a censorship board on the grounds a film was "sacrilegious" was far too damaging to the protections of the First Amendment.

The "death knell" for censorship boards occurred in 1965 when the U.S. Supreme Court found the Maryland law making it a crime to exhibit a film without submitting it to the censorship board was unconstitutional. In Freedman v. Maryland, 380 U.S. 51 (1965), the state's requirement that a film be presented to the board was unconstitutional as it lacked adequate procedural safeguards. While it is not necessarily unconstitutional to require films to be submitted to a censorship board, the board has extremely limited options: a censorship board has no power to prohibit a film, and, if the law grants it that power, the law is unconstitutional. The board's only options when a film is presented to it are either to grant a license for the film or immediately go to court to enjoin its exhibition.

Also, state or local censorship boards had been found to have no jurisdiction over broadcasts by television stations, even when located in the state or community where they are grounded, thus eliminating yet another reason for their existence.

Both the state of Maryland and the province of Ontario retained film censor boards to a particularly late date. Maryland abandoned its board in the 1980s, and a 2004 decision of the Ontario Court of Appeal, reversing a previous trend in favor of the Ontario Film Classification Board's right to insist on cuts, ruled that the province had no right to insist on cuts as a condition of release as Canadian federal obscenity laws were sufficient to deal with obscene material. In May 2005, the Ontario government ended the power of the Classification Board to insist on cuts, requiring all films with adult content that were not judged obscene to be rated "R" for adults only.

In many countries, legally effective rating systems are in effect. See History of British Film Certificates for information on film restrictions in the UK.

=== Industry codes ===
Many industries have formulated "voluntary" codes limiting the content of expression, generally affecting perceived effects on public morality rather than revelation of secrets. Examples of these include the Hays Code, which affected Hollywood films from the 1930s to the 1950s, and the Comics Code, which was designed to deal with the rise of horror comics in the 1950s and lasted into the 1970s. The movie rating system currently in effect in the United States, run by the Motion Picture Association of America (MPAA) is another such industry code. Such codes have generally been adopted with the twofold purposes of forestalling possible government intervention and avoiding unfavorable publicity or boycotts. While such codes are not generally enforced by governmental action, they are generally enforced on content producers by gatekeepers in the marketing chain: studios in the case of the Hays Code, distributors in the case of the Comics Code and theater chains in the case of the MPAA rating system. Content producers have often objected to these codes and argue that they are, in effect, a form of prior restraint. However, the first amendment prohibition of prior restraint applies to government or court action and does not bind private entities such as theater chains.

== Chile ==
=== Francisco Martorell v. Chile ===
In April 1993, Francisco Martorell published a book titled 'Impunidad diplomática' (Diplomatic Impunity) in Argentina with Editorial Planeta. The book was about, among other things, the events that led an erstwhile Argentinian ambassador, Oscar Spinosa Melo, to leave Chile. The book—scheduled to start selling in Chile the day after its launch in Argentina—met with a protection remedy by a Chilean businessman before the Santiago Court of Appeals, who argued the text injured his right to privacy. Thus, the court issued an interlocutory injunction ('orden de no innovar') that temporarily prohibited the book's entry, distribution and circulation in Chile pending a final ruling on the case. Thereafter, several people filed complaints against Martorell for defamation (injuria) and false imputation of a publicly actionable crime (calumnia).

Subsequently, through an extraordinary remedy, Martorell appealed to the Supreme Court of Chile and invoked the constitutional guarantees of freedom of the press. But in a unanimous decision handed down on June 15, 1993, the Supreme Court denied the appeal and forbade the book's circulation, formally notifying Martorell of its decision some days later.

The Inter-American Commission on Human Rights (ICHR) had to determine whether the Chilean court's decision to prohibit the entry, circulation and distribution of Martorell's Diplomatic Impunity violated freedom of expression under Article 13 of the American Convention on Human Rights (ACHR), which states:

1. Everyone has the right to freedom of thought and expression. This right includes freedom to seek, receive, and impart information and ideas of all kinds, regardless of frontiers, either orally, in writing, in print, in the form of art, or through any other medium of one's choice.
2. The exercise of the right provided for in the foregoing paragraph shall not be subject to prior censorship but shall be subject to subsequent imposition of liability, which shall be expressly established by law...'

The Commission reaffirmed that freedom of expression, which it averred involves the right to express ideas and thoughts and receive them. As such, when an individual's right to express themself restricted, it also affects the public's right to receive information. The Commission indicated that Article 13.2 of the ACHR allows certain restrictions upon one's exercise of freedom of expression and stipulates the legitimate limits and the requirements for establishing these restrictions. In this sense, the right can only be legitimately restricted through the imposition of subsequent liabilities provided for by law and deemed necessary to ensure the objectives established in the Convention. The Commission recalled that protecting 'the rights or the reputation of others' is a legitimate purpose for the Convention. However, regarding the rights of privacy, honour and dignity outlined in Article 11 of this instrument, 'the organs of the State cannot interpret the provisions of Article 11 in a manner that violates Article 13, which prohibits prior censorship'.

Accordingly, the IACHR stressed that the Convention stipulates that prior censorship is incompatible with the full enjoyment of the rights protected by this instrument. The Commission underscored ACHR as the only human rights instrument containing this prohibition, indicating the veritable importance the Inter-American system placed on the freedom of expression. In May 1993, the Court of Appeals granted the judicial remedy brought by the Chilean businessman and affirmed the measure that 'prohibited the entrance and commercialization of the book in Chile'. A subsequent to the Supreme Court was rejected.

In the case under review, the Commission considered the decision to ban the entry, circulation and distribution of the book Diplomatic Impunity in Chile was contrary to Article 13 of the ACHR. For the Commission, this constituted an act before censorship and, thus, was not a legitimate restriction on the right to freedom of expression.

== See also ==
- Human rights
- Freedom of speech
- Freedom of the press
- Freedom of thought
- Censorship
- Censorship in the United States
- DA-Notice
- Imprimatur
- Imprisonment of Roger Shuler
- Media transparency
- The Mortgage Specialists, Inc. v. Implode-Explode Heavy Industries, Inc., a New Hampshire Supreme Court case applying prior restraint law to online defendants.
- Tory v. Cochran
- United States free speech exceptions
- Westmoreland v. CBS
- Book burnings in Chile

== Bibliography ==
- Born Secret: The H-Bomb, the Progressive Case and National Security Devolpi (Pergamon) 1981
- The Secret that Exploded, Howard Morland (Random House) 1981 About the Progressive case.
- Minnesota Rag: Corruption, Yellow Journalism, and the Case That Saved Freedom of the Press, Fred W. Friendly (University of Minnesota Press) 1982 A history of the Near case.
- The Good Guys, The Bad Guys and The First Amendment: Free speech vs. fairness in broadcasting by Fred W. Friendly (Random House; 1976) (ISBN 0-394-49725-2)
- Make No Law : The Sullivan Case and the First Amendment Anthony Lewis (Random House) 1991 A history of the case that established the actual malice standard for libel of public officials.
- Beyond the Burning Cross: A Landmark Case of Race, Censorship, and the First Amendment Edward J. Cleary (Vintage) 1995 A History of R.A.V. v. St Paul a "hate crime" case.
- The Day the Presses Stopped: A History of the Pentagon Papers Case David Rudenstine (University of California Press) 1996
- American Aurora: A Democratic-Republican Returns : The Suppressed History of Our Nation's Beginnings and the Heroic Newspaper That Tried to Report It Richard N. Rosenfeld (St. Martin's Press) 1997 A newspaper suppression case in the early years of the United States.
- Press Censorship in Elizabethan England Cyndia Susan Clegg (Cambridge University Press) 1997
- Flag Burning and Free Speech: The Case of Texas v. Johnson Robert Justin Goldstein (University Press of Kansas) 2000
- The Law of Public Communication Kent R. Middleton, William E. Lee, and Bill F. Chamberlin (Allyn & Bacon) 2003 A general survey of the current US law.
- The Tyranny of Printers": Newspaper Politics in the Early American Republic Jeffrey L. Pasley (University Press of Virginia) 2003
- Perilous Times: Free Speech in Wartime from The Sedition Act of 1798 to The War on Terrorism Geoffrey R. Stone (W. W. Norton & Company) 2004
