= SurveyUSA =

Polling firm in the United States

SurveyUSA is a polling firm in the United States. It conducts market research for corporations and interest groups, but is best known for conducting opinion polls for various political offices and questions. SurveyUSA conducts these opinion polls under contract by over 50 television stations (who also use the SurveyUSA market research to fine-tune their newscasts for higher ratings). The difference between SurveyUSA and other telephone polling firms is twofold. First, SurveyUSA does not use live call center employees, but an automated system. Taped questions are asked of the respondent by a professional announcer (usually a local news anchor), and the respondent is invited to press a button on their touch tone telephone or record a message at a prompt designating their selection. Secondly, SurveyUSA uses more concise language, especially for ballot propositions, than competitors. This can lead to diverging results, such as for California Proposition 76, where one version of the SurveyUSA question with a one sentence description, polled significantly differently compared to another version with a three sentence description (which was similar to a version of the question used by other pollsters, which used a five or six sentence question).

SurveyUSA is owned by Hypotenuse, Inc., a privately held company in New Jersey.

As of March 2023, the polling analysis website FiveThirtyEight, led by statistician Nate Silver, had 856 SurveyUSA polls in its database, and gave SurveyUSA an "A+" grade on the basis of its historical accuracy and methodology. FiveThirtyEight listed SurveyUSA as having an 89% accuracy rate in calling elections.

== Methodology ==
SurveyUSA has historically relied on random sampling methods for its polling, but switched to include nonprobability sampling methods as well in the 2010s. SurveyUSA varies polling contact methods on a project-by-project basis, using both telephone and online surveys of respondents, including blends of methods for single polls. Telephone polls vary in usage of live and automated interviewers and implement quasirandom methods to select a respondent from a household. SurveyUSA obtains telephone sample data from data mining company Aristotle, Inc. and non-telephone samples from both Aristotle and marketing research company Federated Sample. It conducts phone surveys on both landlines and cell phones. Poll questions and answer options are sometimes presented in rotated orders to prevent order and recency bias.

SurveyUSA states that it conducts minimal weighting on poll results. Its polls weight demographic variables using either voter files and US Census Bureau figures, depending on the type of sample that was surveyed. Common characteristics that are weighted include gender, age, and race.
