= Nth Country Experiment =

Cold War project to demonstrate the ease of building nuclear weapons

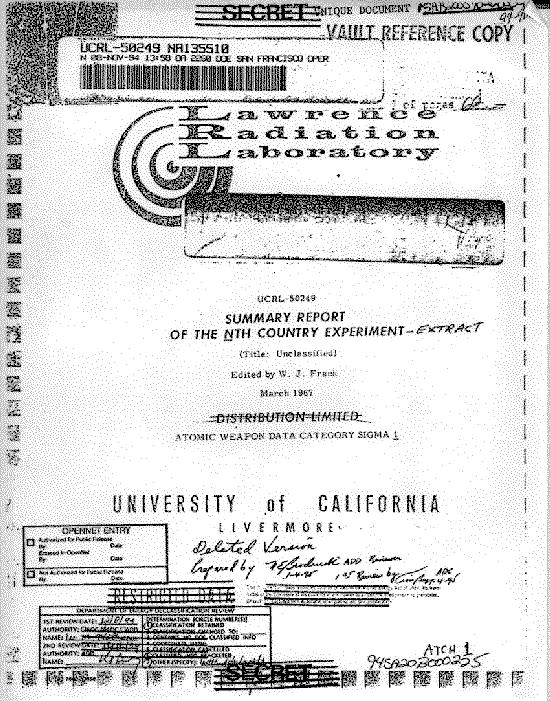
The cover sheet of the once secret summary report on the "Nth Country Experiment".

Two-point implosion style design replicated with the Nth Country experiment.

The Nth Country Experiment was an experiment conducted by Lawrence Livermore National Laboratory starting in May 1964 that sought to assess the risk of nuclear proliferation. The experiment consisted in paying three young physicists who had just received their PhDs, though they had no prior weapons experience, to develop a working nuclear weapon design, using only unclassified information, and with basic computational and technical support. "The goal of the participants should be to design an explosive with a militarily significant yield", the report on the experiment read, "A working context for the experiment might be that the participants have been asked to design a nuclear explosive which, if built in small numbers, would give a small nation a significant effect on their foreign relations."

The experiment ended on April 10, 1967, after three person-years of work over two and a half calendar years. According to a heavily redacted declassified version of the summary, lab weapons experts apparently judged that the team had come up with a credible design for a two-point implosion–style nuclear weapon. It was also judged likely that they would have been able to design a simpler "gun combination"–type weapon even more quickly, although in such a case the limiting factor in developing the weapon is not usually design difficulty but rather procurement of material (enriched uranium).

The term "Nth Country" referred to the goal to assess the difficulty of developing basic weapons design (not the development of the weapons themselves) for any country with a relatively small amount of technical infrastructure—if the United States was the first country to develop nuclear weapons, and the USSR the second, and so on, which would be the nth?

Due to increased publicly available resources about nuclear weapons, it is reasonable to assume that a viable weapon design could be reached with even less effort today. But in the history of nuclear weapons, the development of fission weapons was never strongly hindered by basic design questions, except in the very first nuclear weapons programs.

The Summary Report of the Nth Country Experiment was declassified—though heavily redacted—in 2003. Edited by experienced Manhattan Project and Lawrence Livermore National Laboratory weapons designer James Frank—who told Dobson and Selden that they had designed a weapon comparable to that used in the atomic bombing of Hiroshima—it was originally published in 1967. The National Security Archive published additional documents in 2025.

== Summary ==
In April 1964, Lawrence Livermore National Laboratory (then known as Livermore Radiation Laboratory) hired physicists David A. Dobson and David N. Pipkorn to design a nuclear explosive with "militarily significant yield".

The next year, Pipkorn dropped out of the project and was replaced by Robert W. Seldon, a captain in the United States Army Reserve. Like Pipkorn and Dobson, Seldon had a physics PhD and no nuclear expertise.

The experiments the physicists completed were split into three phases, each representing the "attainment of a physical level of understanding." Phase I was the understanding of basic concepts and considerations of bomb design, much like the process of creation originally undertaken by J. Robert Oppenheimer at Los Alamos. Phase II was the quantitative expansion of those basic concepts into practical application by calculating core mass, hole size, explosive thickness, etc., which are essential to the careful design of atomic weapons. Finally, Phase III was an "extension of Phase II" that involved actual implosion and fission calculations. Plutonium implosion-style designs were then formulated.

Historical fission designs began with many-point triggers for the chemical detonation, up to a 92-point design in the Ivy King fission test. The physicists selected the more novel two-point implosion. This had first appeared in open literature in a Swedish nuclear weapon design in 1956. The Swan nuclear primary was another early two-point design, first tested in 1956. Certain aspects of the UCRL-50239, including the two-point nature of the implosion, have been omitted from the report.

== See also ==
- John Aristotle Phillips—A Princeton undergraduate who in 1977 apparently accomplished a similar feat as the Nth Country Experiment
- Nuclear terrorism
- Smyth Report—First U.S. release on nuclear weapons technical information (1945)
- United States v. The Progressive, et al.—A court case about Howard Morland constructing the design for the hydrogen bomb from public domain documents
