= Mauricio De Vengoechea =

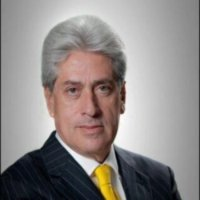
- De Vengoechea in 2016

Personal details
- Born: Mauricio De Vengoechea; 10 December 1953 (age 72) Bogotá, Colombia
- Profession: Political consultant

Mauricio De Vengoechea (born 10 December 1953) is a Colombian political consultant. He is a political strategy consultant with De Vengeochea & Associates. He served as President of the Latin American Association of Political Consultants (ALACOP) from 1998 until 2000 and was elected as a vice-president of the International Association of Political Consultants in November 2015.

In March 2011, De Vengoechea was named to a "Dream Team" of political campaigners by Aristotle, Inc. and the American Association of Political Consultants. In 2016, he was appointed as an honorary member of the Reed Latin Hall of fame.

== Media Analyst ==
Throughout his career he has been invited as a political analyst by various media and TV programs in Latin America such as CNN Spanish, NTN-24 and Tele Morning Canal 11 in Dominican Republic; Oppenheimer Presents; and newspapers such as The Miami Herald and El Universal of Caracas.
