= John Aristotle Phillips =

American activist and businessman (born 1955)

John Phillips
- Born: John Aristotle Phillips; August 23, 1955 (age 71)
- Education: University of California, Berkeley (attended); Princeton University (BS)

John Aristotle Phillips (born August 23, 1955) is a U.S. entrepreneur specializing in political campaigns. Phillips first became famous in the 1970s for writing a term paper on how to design a nuclear bomb based solely on publicly available information. He was dubbed the A-Bomb Kid by the media and became a minor celebrity. Phillips is also the co-founder of Aristotle, Inc. (a non-partisan technology consulting firm for political campaigns) and PredictIt (an online prediction market that offers exchanges on political and financial events).

== "A-Bomb Kid" ==
John Aristotle Phillips was born in August 1955 to a family of Greek immigrants. He grew up in North Haven, Connecticut, with his brother Dean. John's father was a professor of engineering at Yale University, and his mother was a schoolteacher. In 1973, Phillips enrolled at the University of California at Berkeley, but two years later he transferred to Princeton University. He was a major in physics, and played the tiger mascot at sports events.

At Princeton University, he attended a seminar on arms control in which he read John McPhee's The Curve of Binding Energy (1974), which profiled the nuclear weapon designer Ted Taylor. In the book, Taylor argues that there was no real barrier to the development of crude nuclear weapons, even for terrorists, other than the possession of fissile material like enriched uranium or separated plutonium. Any "secrets" that had existed had long been declassified. Taylor's argument was made in the service of urging for stronger fissile material controls in the United States and abroad.

For his junior-year independent research project for his physics degree, Phillips decided that he wanted to try and prove Taylor's thesis correct, in the sense that anyone could design a plausible nuclear weapon based on information in the public domain. As he later wrote:

Suppose an average — or below-average in my case — physics student at a university could design a workable atomic bomb on paper. That would prove the point dramatically and show the federal government that stronger safeguards have to be placed on the manufacturing and use of plutonium. In short, if I could design a bomb, almost any intelligent person could.

The physicist Freeman Dyson agreed to be his advisor of the paper, but told Phillips that he would give him no classified information. Phillips relied upon first-principles derivations of the physics of nuclear weapons, information obtained from declassified books and reports (including the Los Alamos Primer), and information obtained from making phone calls to contractors and chemical companies under false pretenses, in order to work out the specifications for a crude plutonium implosion-type nuclear weapon and the mathematics required to show it was plausible. The final paper, "The Fundamentals of Atomic Bomb Design: An Assessment of the Problems and Possibilities Confronting a Terrorist Group or Non-Nuclear National Attempting to Design a Crude Pu239 Fission Bomb," was turned in by Phillips in May 1976. Dyson gave it an "A". He also removed it from circulation. Contrary to many hyperbolic stories of this event, the paper was never seized by the US government or the FBI.

If this bomb had actually been built, it is unknown whether it would have worked in the sense that it would have achieved the power Phillips predicted, as it is difficult to predict the effectiveness of primitive bomb designs. As Dyson later put it:

[Phillips] had mastered quickly and competently the principles of shockwave dynamics. But his sketch of the bomb was far too sketchy for the question "Would it actually explode?" to have any meaning. To me the impressive and frightening part of his paper was the first part [in which he described how he got the information]. The fact that a twenty-year-old kid could collect such information so quickly and with so little effort gave me the shivers.

Another student in the course told a reporter at the Trenton Times about Phillips paper. Phillips was advised by Taylor, who then worked at Princeton, that going "public" with his story might help avert the sale of a nuclear reactor to Pakistan from France, which Taylor thought would be a good idea given the proliferation potential of such a sale. Phillips agreed to be the subject of the story. The story ended up being syndicated and re-written by national newspapers, including the New York Times and the Los Angeles Times. In many of these stories, the original intent of Phillips — to show that there were really no "nuclear secrets" — was overlooked. Instead, they focused on how Phillips had acquired the "secrets", and some even implied that he had built, and not just designed, a weapon.

Several months after the story first went public, in February 1977, Phillips was contacted by someone from the Pakistani embassy trying to purchase his bomb design. Phillips went to the FBI. The incident was addressed on the Senate floor by William Proxmire and Charles Percy. Senator William Proxmire later used the incident to embarrass the French government, which was preparing to sell "peaceful" nuclear technology to Pakistan.

Phillips had become a minor celebrity by this time, dubbed "The A-Bomb Kid" by the media, and making a series of television appearances including a featured spot on the game show To Tell the Truth.

In 1979, Phillips published his story together with a co-author, David Michaelis, as Mushroom: The True Story of the A-Bomb Kid (ISBN 0-671-82731-6 / ISBN 0-688-03351-2). He sold the film rights to CBS on the condition that he would play himself, successfully auditioned, and was cast for the role. However, the project was put on hold and the film was never made. Several years later, Marshall Brickman released The Manhattan Project about a high-school student who builds an atomic bomb. As confirmed by Brickman, the movie was inspired by Phillips's story.

== Political activity ==
Phillips parlayed his celebrity status into a brief political career as an anti-nuclear activist. In 1980 and 1982, he ran for the United States House of Representatives as a Democratic Party candidate in Connecticut's 4th congressional district, losing both times to Republican Stewart McKinney. He was supported by Senator William Proxmire of Wisconsin, and reportedly, President Jimmy Carter and Senator Ted Kennedy.

== Aristotle, Inc. ==
In 1998 Phillips spoke of the critical importance to a political campaign of targeting its advertising, including on the World Wide Web. In 2009 he observed that 8.9% of registered voters in the United States are ineligible to vote because they have moved away or died.

The experience he had gained during his campaigns obtaining the voter list from the state and using it for campaign purposes led John Phillips and his brother Dean (who had written a program to handle the list on an Apple II) to found Aristotle, Inc. in 1983, a non-partisan technology consulting firm for political campaigns which John Philips has since led as the CEO. It specializes in combining voter lists with personal data from other sources (such as income, gun ownership or church attendance) and data-mining, to assist with microtargeting of specific voter groups; as of 2007, its database contained detailed information about ca. 175 million U.S. voters and it had about 100 employees.

Aristotle has served every occupant of the White House since Ronald Reagan, and consults for several top political action committees.

As Justin Thomas from Vanity Fair put it, Aristotle "could be seen as a breakthrough in electoral politics, or a new low in privacy invasion, depending on your perspective."

== Legal battles ==
Between 1988 and 2007, Phillips was the plaintiff in five lawsuits and the defendant in five more.

In May 1987, Campaigns & Elections (C&E) magazine reviewed Campaign Manager, Aristotle's software. According to the case files, Phillips learned in advance that the review contained negative comments, which he believed to be false. After several unsuccessful attempts to get the editors to make changes to the article, he concluded that the negative review was prompted by his earlier removal of Aristotle's advertisement from the magazine and by the personal dislike of publisher James Dwinell. According to Phillips, during their first meeting, Dwinell called him "a sleazy guy." A few weeks after the review was published, Phillips launched a rival publication, Campaign Industry News, and filed a lawsuit against C&E. A year and a half later, Dwinell settled the dispute with Phillips, paying him his legal fees and $100,000 in cash, most of which Phillips immediately invested in Campaign Industry News. In 1993, when Dwinell sold C&E to Ron Faucheux, Phillips made a deal with Faucheux under which he ceased publication of Campaign Industry News and transferred its subscribers to C&E. In exchange, Faucheux gave Phillips a moderate amount of cash and several years of free advertising for Aristotle.

In 1992–1996, Phillips and Aristotle clashed in court with RR Donnelley and its direct-mail subsidiary, Metromail Corp. Back in 1990, Aristotle hired Metromail to append phone numbers to voter records. According to Aristotle, Metromail violated a contract by using some of the voter data for its own commercial purposes. Metromail was accused of collecting and selling data on children without parental consent. Aristotle filed a $5.3 million lawsuit in March 1992. In 1994 Phillips purchased more than $1 million worth of Donnelley stock. He explained that this enabled him to demand that Donnelley's board of directors finance an external audit of Metromail's data processing methods. Phillips managed to attract a great deal of media attention to the case, and concerns were raised that his efforts were not solely motivated by vigilance. In any case, in her own independent investigation, Los Angeles television reporter Kira Phillips easily purchased a list from Metromail containing the names, addresses, genders, and dates of birth of 5,000 children in Pasadena between the ages of 1 and 12. The journalist used the name of Richard Allen Davis, Polly Klaas' killer to make the purchase. Her report provided further evidence supporting the allegations against Metromail. In early 1995, Metromail settled for $2.7 mln. In March 1996, Donnelley announced the sale of 58% of its stake in Metromail.

== Political activity abroad ==
Even by critics, Phillips is praised for his help to developing democracies. In late 2004 in Ukraine, Phillips and Aristotle helped presidential candidate Viktor Yushchenko expose vote fraud by Kremlin-backed Viktor Yanukovich. Phillips also confirmed contacts with politicians from Algeria, Kosovo, the Palestinian Fatah Party. He consulted Hugo Chavez's opponents in Venezuela. In 2017 in Kenya, he served as a consultant for opposition candidate Raila Odinga.

== Personal life ==
As of 2007, Phillips lived in San Francisco with his wife Patty, a former Wilhelmina model and currently an art school teacher, and daughter.

== See also ==
- Born secret – Information classified since created; generally referring to nuclear weapons
- The Manhattan Project (film) – 1986 thriller film by Marshall Brickman
- Nth Country Experiment – Cold War project to demonstrate the ease of building nuclear weapons
- United States v. Progressive, Inc. – 1979 court case
