= Imprisonment of Roger Shuler =

2013–2014 incident involving defamation

The imprisonment of Roger Shuler was an event in United States jurisprudence in 2013–2014 which attracted some notice both nationally and internationally for its application of prior restraint and of imprisonment for defamation, both unusual under American law. Shuler was held for five months by the State of Alabama.

== Background ==
Roger Shuler, an Alabama blogger, started the Legal Schnauzer blog in 2007 to document a property dispute with his neighbor. Shuler later expanded the blog to cover Alabama politics. Shuler, a critic of the Alabama Republican Party and former governor Bob Riley in particular, has made several controversial allegations, such as that federal judge William H. Pryor Jr. had appeared in a pornographic magazine as a youth and that several local deaths reported as suicides were actually political murders, although Shuler's wife has said that any characterization of Shuler as regularly engaging in salacious and defamatory writing about Alabama lawmakers and policymakers is false.

Starting in January 2013, Shuler began writing a series of posts which quoted anonymous sources alleging that the son of former governor Bob Riley had impregnated a woman and secretly paid for an abortion. Riley's son and the woman denied the allegation, and the woman has sworn in an affidavit that they had never even been alone in the same room.

== Injunction and imprisonment ==
In July 2013, Riley's son and the woman sued Shuler for defamation and asked for injunction against the publication of the material. In September 2013 a judge issued an order mandating that the offending material be removed from the website and barring Shuler from publishing any defamatory statement about Riley's son and the woman.

Shuler refused to comply with the court orders or acknowledge their legitimacy – he did not appear at a number of hearings, and threw the original papers from his car window (Shuler maintains that the orders were improperly served and thus invalid).

Shuler was arrested, charged with contempt of court (and also with resisting arrest; Shuler says he was beaten) and jailed on October 23, 2013. Shuler was convicted on a misdemeanor charge of resisting arrest on January 14, 2014, and given probation on that charge while remaining in jail on the contempt charge.

== International support ==
The Committee to Protect Journalists included Shuler in its December 2013 list of imprisoned journalists, describing him as "independent blogger specializing in allegations of corruption and scandal in Republican circles in Alabama". At this time, Shuler was the only person in the Americas on the CPJ list. The committee's Sara Rafsky said that "the sanctity of the [American] prohibition against censorship is now being challenged in a perplexing case which ... could have wider implications for the press".

== First Amendment issues ==
In American law and legal tradition, prior restraint – the prevention of materials being published at all, as opposed to penalties being assessed after publication – is usually only invoked for extraordinary reasons, such as protection of national security in wartime. The use of prior restraint in this case, and the judge's decision to keep the case under seal, caused some First Amendment experts to express concern.

Some observers who were not supporters of Shuler and who allowed that the material in question may well have been defamatory decried the use of prior restraint in the case. For instance, the National Bloggers Club released a statement condemning Shuler's "rumormonger cyberbullying" but also criticizing the potential chilling effect of the injunction. AL.com (an online news service set up by the Birmingham News, the Huntsville Times and the Mobile Press-Register) stated:

Roger Shuler might be a wingnut conspiracy theorist and a crackpot. He might unfairly besmirch conservative Alabama politicians with little or no evidence to back up outlandish accusations. But he is certainly an American. As such, he certainly has a constitutional right to free speech, and that right certainly has been trampled by a judge in an Alabama circuit court.

— Mike Marshall, AL.com

First Amendment law expert Ken White summed up the situation as one where "there's no good guys," noting that it was possible to believe "that what the court is doing is unconstitutional and troublesome and also that Shuler is his own worst enemy." Salon's Natasha Lennard defended not only Shuler's First Amendment rights but also his standing as a journalist, describing him as a person with "a reputation for exposing corruption and hypocrisy within the Alabama state house and Legislature" whose "journalism has earned him some powerful enemies".

The American Civil Liberties Union filed a brief contesting constitutionality of the injunction and also requesting that the case be unsealed, which it later was.

== Release and subsequent events ==
Shuler remained imprisoned into 2014, and did not engage a lawyer or formally contest his incarceration. Shuler later had the material under contention removed from his blog, and was consequently released from prison on March 26, 2014. In his release order, the judge maintained that the injunction was permanent and that Shuler remains subject to its terms indefinitely.

In June 2014, an arrest warrant was issued for Shuler on the basis of a motion by the Shelby County District Attorney's Office to revoke Shuler's probation on his conviction for resisting arrest, as Shuler had failed to pay court ordered fees and fines and did not appear as ordered by the court.

On April 14, 2015, a Jefferson County judge issued a $3.5 million default judgment against Shuler and his website in a defamation case involving Alabama Attorney General Luther Strange. The lawsuit was filed by Strange's former campaign manager, Jessica Medeiros Garrison and concerned comments Shuler had made on his blog suggesting that she and Strange had had an affair and that Strange was the father of her son.
