= David Michaelis =

American writer

David Tead Michaelis (born October 3, 1957) is an American writer since the late 1970s. As a biographer, Michaelis wrote about N.C. Wyeth, Charles Schulz and Eleanor Roosevelt. He won the 1999 Ambassador Book Award in the Autobiography and Biography category with N.C. Wyeth: A Biography and was nominated for the Los Angeles Times Book Prize for Biography in 2021 with Eleanor. With his non-fiction works, Michaelis also co-wrote John Aristotle Phillips's biography and wrote about male friendship.

Outside of non-fiction, Michaelis wrote the 1989 fiction book titled Boy, Girl, Boy, Girl. Apart from literature, Michaelis edited The Paris Review in the 1970s. The following decade, he wrote for Manhattan, inc. and volunteered with the New York City Police Department.

== Early life and education ==
Michaelis was born in Boston, Massachusetts on October 3, 1957. During the 1960s, Michaelis enjoyed The Beatles and archery. For his post-secondary education, Michaelis attended Princeton University and lived with John Aristotle Phillips.

In 1976, Michaelis and Phillips were co-authors of an unreleased theatrical production while at Princeton. During the 1970s, they created the Aristotle Pizza Delivery Agency for the university. Their company also sold popcorn and frozen yogurt at Princeton. By the late 1970s, Michaelis was a short story author before he became interested in nonfiction.

== Career ==
=== Literature ===
In 1977, Michaelis and Phillips wrote about "their experiences with the atomic bomb and growing up in the 70s" with a book scheduled to be released as Falling Upward the following year. With Mushroom: The Story of the A-Bomb Kid, their 1978 book was about Phillips and the atomic bomb blueprint he created while at Princeton. While reviewing the book for The Central New Jersey Home News, Lawrence Ausubel believed that fictional newspapers were included in Mushroom. In 2017, a planned movie based on the book was announced by Deadline.

In 1983, Michaelis published The Best of Friends: Profiles of Extraordinary Friendships. For The Best of Friends, Michaelis mainly wrote about males who were not famous. Of the fourteen people in the book, some people Michaelis discussed included John F. Kennedy and Isamu Noguchi. With his 1989 fictional book titled Boy, Girl, Boy, Girl, Michaelis wrote about a man remembering his time at Miss Little's School for Girls when he was a teenager.

By the early 1990s, Michaelis had begun writing about perfectionism for a fictional book. He then changed his focus to a N.C. Wyeth biography after his spouse gave him the idea during 1991. Michaelis's work, N.C. Wyeth: A Biography was released in 1998. He co-authored the 2000 book One Nation: Patriots and Pirates Portrayed by N.C. Wyeth and James Wyeth alongside Lauren Raye Smith and Tom Brokaw.

In 2001, Michaelis was selected to write a biography on Charles Schulz. As a contributor, Michaelis wrote about Schulz in the 2004 publication of The Complete Peanuts: 1950-1952. His biography on Schulz was released in 2007 titled Schulz and Peanuts: A Biography. Before the Schulz biography was set to be published that year, Schulz's family said there were mistakes and missing information in the book by Michaelis. While talking about the book, Michaelis said there was nothing incorrect in his biography on Schulz.

Michaelis began his book on Eleanor Roosevelt in 2009. During 2020, he released his Roosevelt biography titled Eleanor. In her review of the book, Gail Collins of The New York Times said it was "the first major single-volume biography [of Eleanor Roosevelt] in more than half a century".

=== Additional positions ===
In the late 1970s, he held an editing position with The Paris Review. He then wrote for Manhattan, inc. the following decade. By the 2000s, some magazines his contributions appeared in were The New Republic and The American Scholar. Apart from literature, Michaelis worked for the New York City Police Department as a volunteer during the early 1980s. He had been consulted as part of the November 2007 television special titled "Good Ol' Charles Schulz" for American Masters.

== Writing process and themes ==
In the early 1980s, Michaelis conducted personal interviews about male friendships for The Best of Friends. While Michaelis was creating The Best of Friends, James Stewart declined to appear in the book. When the death of John Belushi occurred before The Best of Friends was completed, Michaelis included Belushi's friendship with Dan Aykroyd in his book. Michaelis read personal correspondence that were owned by Houghton Mifflin, the Archives of American Art and the Wyeth family for his biography on N.C. Wyeth. Upon completing his 4,000 page book, Michaelis reduced the length of his biography by over 80 percent before publication.

To create his biography on Schulz, Michaelis examined documents owned by the Schulzes and United Media as part of his research. He also read Peanuts and conducted over 200 interviews. Schulz and Peanuts was revised multiple times before it was ready for publication. Details that were included in the Roosevelt biography by Michaelis were "topography, wardrobe, weather conditions and societal moods".

== Awards and personal life ==
Michaelis won the 1999 Ambassador Book Award in the Autobiography and Biography category with N.C. Wyeth. In 2021, he was a Los Angeles Times Book Prize for Biography nominee with Eleanor. Michaelis had two children during his marriage.

In 2024, Michaelis and his wife, Nancy Steiner, testified in connection with a lawsuit brought against political candidate and anti-vaccine advocate Robert F. Kennedy, Jr. over Kennedy's fraudulent claim of New York State residency in campaign filings with the New York State Board of Elections. Michaelis and Steiner's Westchester home was cited by Kennedy, a one-time friend, as one of two residences he had claimed to maintain in the state in recent years.
