= Ray Kidder =

American physicist

Ray E. Kidder
- Born: November 12, 1923; New York City, United States
- Died: December 3, 2019 (aged 96)
- Occupations: Physicist, weapons designer, arms control advocate
- Years active: 1956–2000
- Employer: Lawrence Livermore National Laboratory

Ray E. Kidder (12 November 1923 – 3 December 2019) was an American physicist and nuclear weapons designer. He is best known for his outspoken views on nuclear weapons policy issues, including nuclear testing, stockpile management, and arms control.

== Early life ==
Kidder was born in New York City to father Harry Alvin, and lived in Manhattan as a young child, until he moved with his family to Riverside, Connecticut. His father was a manager at the IRT Powerhouse in Manhattan, this plant powered much of the Interborough Rapid Transit Company subways until it was absorbed by the New York City Board of Transportation in 1940.

He attended Loomis Chaffee Boarding School in Windsor, Connecticut, before enrolling in the California Institute of Technology in 1942. He would return to Connecticut during his sophomore year, and began working for American Cyanamid as a research assistant. In 1943, after the United States became involved in World War II, he worked as a radio technician in the Navy. After his service, he attended Ohio State University in 1947, where he would both complete his bachelor degree, and earn post graduate degrees.

== Career ==
Kidder was a weapons physicist at Lawrence Livermore National Laboratory for 35 years, and retired in 1990. He had arrived at the laboratory in 1956. During his tenure, as well as after his retirement, he became involved in a number of controversial policy issues.

In 1960, Kidder worked with John Nuckolls and Stirling Colgate at Livermore to develop computer simulations for producing nuclear fusion in laser-compressed deuterium-tritium capsules. The results of this work led to Livermore's laser fusion program in 1962, which Kidder was appointed the head of. This program used weapons-derived calculations in an attempt to make usable nuclear fusion sources.

In 1979, Kidder was a witness for the defense in the United States v. The Progressive case, in which the U.S. Department of Energy sought to suppress the publication of a magazine article alleged to reveal the "secret of the hydrogen bomb". Kidder favored uncensored publication of the material, which had been compiled from unclassified sources, and claimed that Nobel Prize-winning physicist Hans Bethe had been misinformed when Bethe swore an affidavit in favor of censorship. Bethe and Kidder then engaged in a classified correspondence debating the issue. The correspondence was declassified in 2001.

In 1997, Kidder argued against the Department of Energy's Stockpile Stewardship and Management Program, calling it "misguided in a number of ways", including introducing unnecessary changes in warhead materials, the cost of large-scale computational and experimental resources, and its effects on arms control efforts. He also criticized the building of the National Ignition Facility, saying it was not essential for stockpile stewardship.

In 1998, the Arms Control and Disarmament Agency (ACDA) asked Kidder to perform an independent technical review of some issues in warhead remanufacture, but Kidder was denied access to the classified material required for the study, despite holding the appropriate security clearance. A controversy ensued, involving U.S. Congressional Representative Ellen Tauscher and Secretary of Energy Bill Richardson.

In 1999, Kidder co-authored an op-ed article in The Washington Post, favoring the Comprehensive Test Ban Treaty then pending before the United States Senate.

In 2000, Kidder wrote to the Justice Ministry of Israel regarding the Mordechai Vanunu case, saying that he did not believe that Vanunu possessed any technical nuclear information that had not already been made public. (The Israeli government opposed Vanunu's release from prison in 1998, claiming he still possessed secret information.)

Kidder resided in Pleasanton, California.

== Selected bibliography ==
- Kidder, Ray E. (1997). "Problems with stockpile stewardship". Nature. 386 (17 April 1997): 645–647. Bibcode:1997Natur.386..645K. doi:10.1038/386645a0. S2CID 4268081. Archived from the original on 23 September 2004.
- Kidder, Ray; Sykes, Lynn; von Hippel, Frank (1999). "False Fears About a Test Ban". The Washington Post. No. October 10, 1999. Archived from the original on 3 February 2015.
