= Nebraska Press Ass'n v. Stuart =

Nebraska Press Association v. Stuart
- Supreme Court of the United States

Argued April 19, 1976 Decided June 30, 1976
- Full case name: Nebraska Press Association v. Hugh Stuart, Judge, District Court of Lincoln County, Nebraska et al.
- Citations: 427 U.S. 539 (more) 96 S. Ct. 2791; 49 L. Ed. 2d 683; 1976 U.S. LEXIS 17

Holding
- Prior restraints by courts on 1st Amendment freedom of the press rights are permissible only when there is no less restrictive way to protect the right to a fair trial under the 6th Amendment.

Court membership
- Chief Justice Warren E. Burger Associate Justices William J. Brennan Jr. · Potter Stewart; Byron White · Thurgood Marshall; Harry Blackmun · Lewis F. Powell Jr. William Rehnquist · John P. Stevens

Case opinions
- Majority: Burger, joined by White, Blackmun, Powell, Rehnquist
- Concurrence: Brennan, joined by Stewart, Marshall
- Concurrence: White
- Concurrence: Powell
- Concurrence: Stevens

Laws applied
- U.S. Const. amend. I

Nebraska Press Association v. Stuart, 427 U.S. 539 (1976), is a landmark Supreme Court of the United States decision in which the Court held that prior restraints on media coverage during criminal trials are presumptively unconstitutional.

== Background ==
Nebraska Press Association v. Stuart involved a debate over whether the press may be prevented from publishing aspects of a criminal trial (or pre-trial proceedings) seen to be "implicative of guilt", in other words, evidence tending to show that the defendant was in fact guilty of the charges. In 1971 the Supreme Court ruled in New York Times Co. v. United States that gag orders, viewed as form of prior restraint are presumptively unconstitutional. In Nebraska Press Ass'n the Supreme Court imposed a high burden on the government in order to sustain a prior restraint against the press. Prior to the 1976 ruling by the Supreme Court, lower courts trying criminal cases across the United States initiated a practice of enjoining the press from reporting certain details in criminal cases that the courts had determined might interfere with a defendant's right to a fair trial by prejudicing potential (or actual) jurors; media coverage of such rulings referred to such judicial orders as gag orders.

== Prior litigation ==
In relation to a sexual assault in 1975 in Sutherland, Nebraska, six people of Henry Kellie's family were killed. Police discovered the six bodies on October 18, 1975, when Sutherland had a population of 850. After defendant Erwin Charles Simants was detained by law enforcement, there was a high level of media coverage of the criminal justice proceedings. Police talked to media who had traveled to the location of the incident, and informed them of descriptive characteristics of the suspect. After surrendering to the police, Simants had an arraignment in Lincoln County Court in North Platte, Nebraska, on October 20, 1975.

The attorney for the defendant, in addition to the prosecutor handling the case, requested the state court system in Nebraska reduce the intensity of the reporting on the incident due to a concern over neutral jury selection. Simants had given law enforcement a confession during the course of the case. After the requests by the attorneys for the defense and present danger that pre-trial publicity could infringe upon the defendant's right to a fair trial". Nebraska state trial judge Hugh Stuart entered an order restraining members of the press from publishing or broadcasting accounts of confessions made by the accused to the police. The judge felt that this measure was necessary to guarantee a fair trial to the accused.

Several media organizations sued, with the Supreme Court of Nebraska upholding the judges' order. The U.S. Supreme Court granted certiorari and oral arguments were held April 19, 1976.

== Decision ==
Chief Justice of the United States Warren E. Burger wrote the opinion of the court. Burger wrote, "prior restraints on speech and publication are the most serious and least tolerable infringement on First Amendment Rights". The court ruled this was particularly at issue when dealing with "communication of news and commentary on current events". According to the ruling, it was inappropriate to bar media reporting on a criminal case prior to the trial itself, except in matters where a "clear and present danger" existed that would impede the process of a fair trial. The court characterized the press as "the handmaiden of effective judicial administration, especially in the criminal" process.

Burger noted, "The press does not simply publish information about trials but guards against the miscarriage of justice by subjecting the police, prosecutors, and judicial processes to extensive public scrutiny and criticism". The court commented on the action of the trial court's order, which had delayed the release of information from the press to the public, writing that prompt reporting is needed if "press coverage is to fulfill its traditional function of bringing news to the public promptly". The decision questioned whether or not it was allowable for the role of government to "insinuate itself into the editorial rooms of this Nation's press".

The court noted that the trial court in the case could have availed itself of other means in order to ensure the process of a fair trial, including: moving the location of the trial to "a place less exposed to the intense publicity", delaying the criminal proceedings until after media attention had died down, querying jurors to make certain they are impartial, issue instructions to the jury telling them to only consider the evidence presented in the trial, and sequester the jury during the proceedings. Burger critically analyzed whether the trial court would even be able to maintain the status of its prior restraint order, external to its specific jurisdictional locale. The court compared the potential harm of press reporting versus the alternative in its absence—rumors spread among individuals in the town, "one can only speculate on the accuracy of such reports, given the generative propensities of such rumors, they could well be more damaging than reasonably accurate news accounts". The court concluded, "but plainly a whole community cannot be restrained from discussing a subject intimately affecting life within it".

== Analysis ==
In their 2006 work Contemporary Supreme Court Cases: Landmark Decisions Since Roe v. Wade, authors Donald E. Lively and Russell L. Weaver wrote, "Nebraska Press is an important decision because it reaffirms the nation's commitment to free speech, and the general impermissibility of prior restraints". Lively and Weaver concluded, "while the Court was sensitive to the important governmental interest in ensuring that criminal defendants receive fair trials, untainted by the threat of excessive and prejudicial publicity, the Court concluded that a trial court has other means, besides prior restraints, for ensuring the right to a fair trial".

Anthony Lewis commented on the outcome of the case, in his 2007 book Freedom for the Thought That We Hate: A Biography of the First Amendment, writing that Nebraska Press Association v. Stuart was "a great victory for the press. If a bar on publishing a confession was wrong in so aggravated a situation—a gruesome multiple murder in a small town—it was hard to see when one would be permissible". Furthermore, Lewis noted, "none was sustained on appeal" afterwards. Paul Siegel noted in his 2007 book Cases in Communication Law, "There is an unavoidable tension between jurors' argued privacy rights and the right of the accused to be judged by impartial peers". Siegel pointed out, "Chief Justice Burger emphasizes that the juror selection process has traditionally been considered a public event and that this openness serves important societal functions".

== See also ==
- Alien and Sedition Acts
- Civil liberties in the United States
- Censorship in the United States
- Freedom of speech in the United States
- List of United States Supreme Court cases by the Burger Court
- List of United States Supreme Court cases, volume 427
- Media transparency
