= Aristotle, Inc. =

Data broker

- Formation: 1983
- Type: Private firm
- Headquarters: 205 Pennsylvania Ave., SE; Washington, DC 20003
- Chairman and CEO: John Aristotle Phillips
- Staff: ~100 (2012)
- Website: http://www.aristotle.com

Aristotle, Inc. is a U.S. company founded and led by brothers John Aristotle Phillips and Dean Aristotle Phillips in 1983, specializing in data mining voter data for political campaigns. Obtaining and using this information helps political candidates microtarget voters.

== History ==
John Aristotle Phillips, Aristotle's co-founder, became known in the 1970s as "A-Bomb Kid" after writing a term paper on designing a nuclear weapon using only publicly available books and articles. His 34-page paper included a step-by-step plan for a beachball-size explosive of 125 pounds that could explode with half the force of the Hiroshima bomb, at a cost of approximately $2,000. After graduating from university, Phillips, an anti-nuclear activist, attempted to use his publicity to launch a political career. He ran for Congress as a Democrat in his home state of Connecticut, in the fourth district, but lost twice to Republican Stuart McKinney. During his campaign, Phillips requested a list of registered voters in his district from the Connecticut Board of Elections. John's brother, Dean, wrote a program on an Apple II that turned the list into the equivalent of a simple spreadsheet application. This allowed Phillips to micro-target voters in the district, and he managed to significantly outpoll his older, better-financed primary opponents. Although John lost the election, the brothers' software became well known, and many campaign teams were eager to purchase it.

Aristotle, Inc. was founded in 1983 as a non-partisan technology consulting firm for political campaigns. It specializes in combining voter lists with personal data from other sources (such as income, gun ownership or church attendance) and data-mining, to assist with micro-targeting of specific voter groups. In the U.S., twenty-two states allow marketers to purchase them for commercial use.

In 1984, Aristotle was hired by Ronald Reagan and Walter Mondale. By 1992, Bill Clinton, George H. W. Bush, and Ross Perot were its clients. Since Reagan, Aristotle has served every occupant of the White House and consulted for several top political action committees. As confirmed by University of Washington professor Philip Howard, Aristotle's records go back to the beginning of the computer age, in the 1970s, and include lots of personal data such as data on personal credit cards, driving records, magazine subscriptions, and political contributions. Aristotle's voter profile includes information about their cars, ethnicity, income, employers, and up to 25 other factors.

In June 1995, Phillips took a controversial step by organising his brother Dean's presidential campaign, with no real hope of victory, but for business reasons. The candidacy enhanced Aristotle's access to voter data: in some states and counties the cost of voter data varied according to who was buying it, thus Dean as a candidate could purchase it at lower prices and gain access to restricted data (the fact was denied by Aristotle's lawyer Blair Richardson). The candidacy also helped Aristotle double-check the accuracy of its Campaign Manager software.

By 2000, Aristotle's client list had included 45 senators, more than 200 members of the House, 46 Republican and Democratic state parties.

As of 2007, a 27% stake of Aristotle belonged to W. R. Hambrecht & Co., 13.5% – to Rupert Murdoch's News Corp.

According to Federal Election Commission filings from 2006 and 2007 the majority of Aristotle's client candidates were Republicans. At least since 2007 the company had been selling data to commercial clients.

By December 2012, Aristotle had grown to 100 employees spread across offices in its headquarters on Capitol Hill, as well as in Atlanta, San Francisco, Toronto, London, and Spanish Fork, Utah. By then, the Aristotle database included detailed information on approximately 175 million voters in the United States, as well as 35 million people in the United Kingdom.

In August 2021, the U.S. Federal Trade Commission announced that Aristotle was removed from the list of self-regulatory organizations that police for compliance with the Children's Online Privacy Protection Act (COPPA).

== International influence ==
The company's founder John Aristotle Phillips is praised for his help to developing democracies. In late 2004 in Ukraine, Phillips and Aristotle helped presidential candidate Viktor Yushchenko expose vote fraud by Kremlin-backed Viktor Yanukovich. Phillips also confirmed contacts with politicians from Algeria, Kosovo, the Palestinian Fatah Party. He consulted Hugo Chavez's opponents in Venezuela. In 2017 in Kenya, he served as an advisor to opposition candidate Raila Odinga.

== Opinions ==
As Justin Thomas from Vanity Fair puts it, depending on the perspective, Aristotle can be seen as 'a breakthrough in electoral politics', or as 'a new low in privacy invasion'.

In 2000, the only major presidential candidate who did not use Aristotle's services was Al Gore. His campaign emphasized that "it would not hire any firm whose practices could jeopardize the public's privacy".

== See also ==
- Vocus
