= United States v. Progressive, Inc. =

1979 court case

United States of America v. Progressive, Inc.
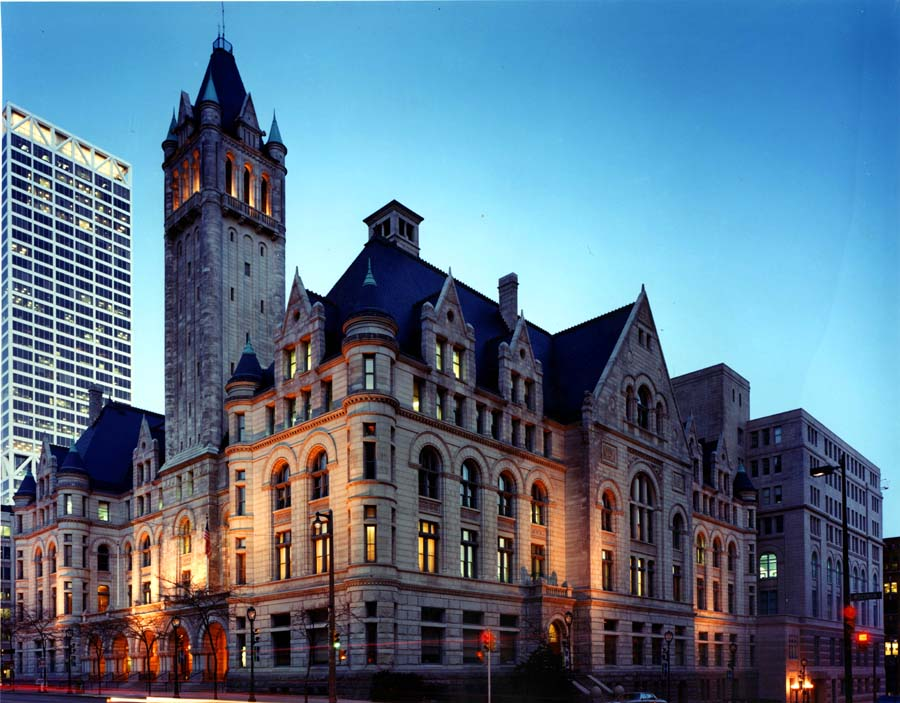
- Federal Building and U.S. Courthouse, Milwaukee, Wisconsin
- Court: United States District Court for the Eastern District of Wisconsin (after the Western District judge recused himself)
- Full case name: United States of America v. Progressive, Inc., Erwin Knoll, Samuel Day, Jr., and Howard Morland.
- Decided: March 28, 1979
- Citation: 467 F. Supp. 990 (W.D. Wis. 1979)

Court membership
- Judge sitting: Robert W. Warren

United States of America v. Progressive, Inc., Erwin Knoll, Samuel Day, Jr., and Howard Morland, 467 F. Supp. 990 (W.D. Wis. 1979), was a lawsuit brought against The Progressive magazine by the United States Department of Energy (DOE) in 1979. A temporary injunction was granted against The Progressive to prevent the publication of an article written by activist Howard Morland that purported to reveal the "secret" of the hydrogen bomb. Though the information had been compiled from publicly available sources, the DOE claimed that it fell under the "born secret" clause of the Atomic Energy Act of 1954.

Although the case was filed in the Western District of Wisconsin, the judge there recused himself as a friend of the magazine. The case was therefore brought before Judge Robert W. Warren, a judge in the Eastern District of Wisconsin. Because of the sensitive nature of information at stake in the trial, two separate hearings were conducted, one in public, and the other in camera. The defendants, Morland and the editors of The Progressive, would not accept security clearances, as they would have had to sign non-disclosure agreements that would have put restraints on their free speech (including, significantly, in written form), and so were not present at the in camera hearings. Their lawyers obtained clearances so that they could participate, but were forbidden from conveying anything they heard to their clients.

The article was eventually published after the government lawyers dropped their case during the appeals process, calling it moot after other information was independently published. Despite its indecisive conclusion, law students still study the case, which "could have been a law school hypothetical designed to test the limits of the presumption of unconstitutionality attached to prior restraints".

== Background ==
=== Secrecy and disclosure ===
The first atomic bombs were developed by the wartime Manhattan Project. This was carried out in secret, lest its discovery induce the Axis powers, particularly Germany, to accelerate their own nuclear projects, or undertake covert operations against the project. The military and scientific leaders of the Manhattan Project anticipated a need to release details of their wartime accomplishments, principally as a form of recognition for the participants who had labored in secrecy. Press releases were prepared in advance of the atomic bombings of Hiroshima and Nagasaki, and an official account, known as the Smyth Report after its author, the physicist Henry DeWolf Smyth, was commissioned in April 1944 to provide a history of the project for public release. The Director of the Manhattan Project, Major General Leslie Groves, his scientific adviser, Richard Tolman, and Smyth agreed that information could be publicly released if it was essential for an understanding of the project, or was already generally known or deducible, or had no significance to the production of atomic bombs. The first copies went on sale on August 12, 1945.

In its October 8, 1945, issue, The New Republic took the position, emphasized with italics, that "there is no secret to be kept": the knowledge of how to build an atomic bomb had been "the common property of scientists throughout the world for the last five years". President Harry S. Truman took a similar line in his first speech to Congress on nuclear matters that month, proclaiming that "the essential theoretical knowledge upon which the discovery is based is already widely known." In November 1945, Groves instructed Tolman to draw up a policy for the declassification of the Manhattan Project's documents. Tolman assembled a committee, which took a list of the Manhattan Project's activities and assigned each a classification. Four reviewers assessed the documents and declassified about 500 of them by the end of the year.

=== Atomic Energy Act ===
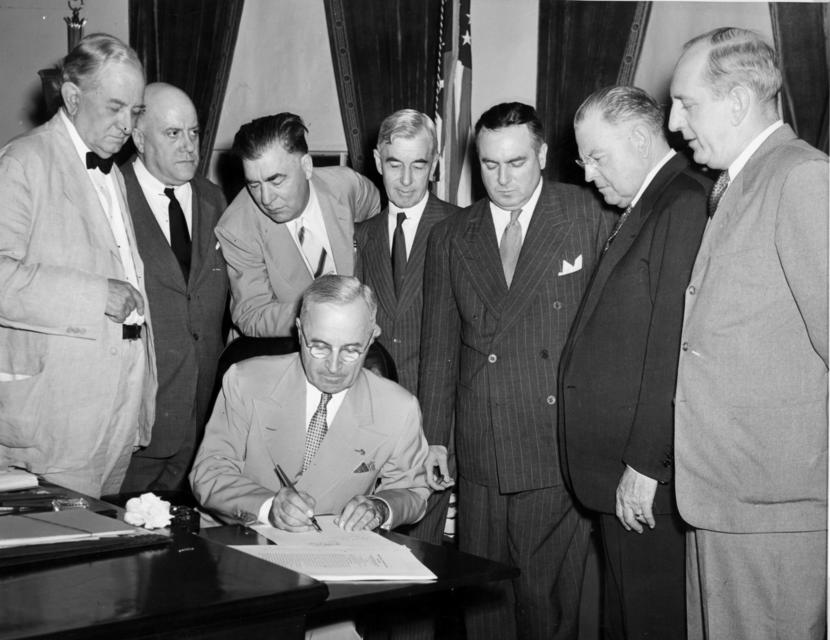
President Harry S. Truman signs the Atomic Energy Act of 1946 establishing the United States Atomic Energy Commission

If there was no secret, then there was no reason for security. The scientists, in particular, chafed under the wartime controls, which were not lifted with the surrender of Japan. On September 1, 1945, Samuel K. Allison used the occasion of the announcement of the founding of the Institute for Nuclear Studies to call for freedom to research and develop atomic energy. He told the press that if controls were not removed, nuclear scientists might turn to the study of the color of butterfly wings. Enrico Fermi warned that "unless research is free and outside of control, the United States will lose its superiority in scientific pursuit".

The War Department envisaged that the Manhattan Project would be superseded by a statutory authority. Legislation to create it was drafted by two War Department lawyers, Kenneth C. Royall and William L. Marbury. Their draft bill ran into strong opposition, particularly from the influential Senator Arthur H. Vandenberg. On December 20, 1945, Senator Brien McMahon introduced an alternative bill on atomic energy, which quickly became known as the McMahon bill. This was initially a very liberal bill towards the control of scientific research, and was broadly supported by scientists. McMahon framed the controversy as a question of military versus civilian control of atomic energy, although the May-Johnson bill also provided for civilian control. Section 10 assigned the patent for any invention related to atomic energy to the commission.

While the bill was being debated, the news broke on February 16, 1946, of the defection of Igor Gouzenko in Canada, and the subsequent arrest of 22 people. The members of Congress debating the bill feared that "atomic secrets" were being systematically stolen by Soviet atomic spies. McMahon convened an executive session at which Federal Bureau of Investigation Director J. Edgar Hoover, Secretary of State James F. Byrnes and Groves were called to appear. Groves revealed that the British physicist Alan Nunn May had passed information about the Manhattan Project to Soviet agents. The more conservative elements in Congress now moved to toughen the act. Section 10, which was formerly titled "Dissemination of Information", now became "Control of Information". Representative Helen Gahagan Douglas, who sponsored the McMahon bill in the House, vigorously defended the section against counterarguments. She dismissed objections that it would "give away the secret of the bomb", asserting that America's advantage in nuclear weapons could only be temporary, whereas the bill could perpetuate the U.S. lead in scientific research. Truman signed the compromise bill into law as the Atomic Energy Act of 1946. It established the Atomic Energy Commission (AEC) as the controlling body for atomic energy.

=== Hydrogen bomb ===
The Manhattan Project had been a crash program to produce a nuclear weapon. Along the way, promising ideas had been set aside. Norris Bradbury, who replaced J. Robert Oppenheimer as director of the Los Alamos National Laboratory in late 1945, revived such projects in order to entice scientists to remain at, or return to, Los Alamos. One of these projects was the "Super", a nuclear weapon using nuclear fusion, which Edward Teller's F-1 group had worked on under Fermi's direction. The technical problem was figuring out a way to get a fusion reaction to initiate and propagate, which required temperatures attainable only with a fission bomb. The hydrodynamic calculations involved were daunting, and ENIAC was used to run a computer simulation of the Super in December 1945 and January 1946.

The Polish mathematician Stanislaw Ulam, his wife Francoise, who performed the calculations, and their collaborator, Cornelius Everett, worked on the Super design through 1949. There was no push from the military for the weapon, because the AEC regarded it as too secret to inform either its own Military Liaison Committee or the Armed Forces Special Weapons Project about it. In September 1949, the Soviet Union detonated a nuclear device. It fell to Oppenheimer, as chairman of the AEC General Advisory Committee (GAC), to decide whether the United States should develop the Super in response. The Super design used large quantities of tritium, which could only be manufactured in a reactor, and therefore at the expense of plutonium production for smaller weapons, so the GAC advised against it. Nonetheless, Truman approved the Super on January 31, 1950. Because of the secrecy surrounding the decision, accounts published in the 1950s incorrectly portrayed Oppenheimer as obstructing its development on political grounds, and this was a factor in the Oppenheimer security hearing in 1954.

Ulam still only gave the design a "50–50 chance" of success in February 1950. At the end of March, he reported that it would not work at all. Scientists like Hans Bethe and George Gamow felt that Teller had committed the nation to an expensive crash program on the basis of a model that he knew was flawed. However, in February 1951, Ulam had a new idea, in which the shock wave from an atomic bomb "primary" stage, through an arrangement he called "hydrodynamic lensing", would compress a "secondary" stage of deuterium fusion fuel wrapped around a plutonium rod or "spark plug". On being informed, Teller immediately grasped the potential for using the X-rays produced by the primary explosion for hydrodynamic lensing. This arrangement, which made thermonuclear weapons possible, is now known as the Teller–Ulam design. Although it was not what Truman had approved, the design did work, and was capable of producing multi-megaton explosions. "Rarely in the history of technology", wrote Howard Morland, "has such a seemingly daunting problem turned out to have such a nifty solution."

In 1950, the Atomic Energy Commission asked Scientific American not to publish an article by Bethe that it claimed revealed classified information about the hydrogen bomb. Scientific American reluctantly agreed to stop the presses and make changes in the article, and to recall and burn the 3,000 copies that had already been printed. The 1951 arrest of Klaus Fuchs, Harry Gold, David Greenglass, Morton Sobell and Julius and Ethel Rosenberg who, according to FBI Director J. Edgar Hoover, "stole the basic secrets of nuclear fission", caused great concern. President Dwight D. Eisenhower denied the Rosenbergs clemency on the grounds that their actions "could well result in the deaths of many, many thousands of innocent citizens", and they were executed. After the Soviet Union detonated Joe 4 in August 1953, newspapers proclaimed that the Soviets had tested a hydrogen bomb. In fact it was only a boosted fission device, but the veil of secrecy covering the thermonuclear program prevented scientists from informing the public.

=== Prior restraint ===
Prior restraint has generally been regarded by U.S. courts, particularly the U.S. Supreme Court, as being "the most serious and least tolerable" of restrictions on the First Amendment. The Blackstone Commentaries defined freedom of the press as "laying no previous restraints upon publication, and not in freedom from censure for criminal matter when published." The Supreme Court had however never held that prior restraint was unconstitutional. On the contrary, in Near v. Minnesota 283 U.S. 697 (1931), Chief Justice Charles E. Hughes remarked that in wartime, "no one would question but that a government might prevent actual obstruction to its recruiting service or the publication of the sailing dates of transports or the number and location of troops." He further suggested that obscenity or incitement to insurrection would be similar grounds for prior restraint. The court subsequently upheld free speech exceptions such as restrictions on demonstrations in Cox v. New Hampshire, 312 U.S. 569 (1941), and censorship of motion pictures in Times Film Corporation v. City of Chicago, 365 U.S. 43 (1961).

In New York Times Co. v. United States 403 U.S. 713 (1971)—better known as the Pentagon Papers case—the government had sought to prevent the publication of classified material by The New York Times. In this case, the Supreme Court ruled 6–3 that the government had not reached the standard required by Near to justify prior restraint, but the concurring justices gave differing opinions about where the line should be drawn. In his opinion, Justice Potter Stewart wrote that while publication of The Pentagon Papers would likely harm the national interest, it would not result in "direct, immediate or irreparable harm to our Nation or its people". Failure to provide a clear line inevitably meant that the court had to deal with prior restraint on a case-by-case basis. In Nebraska Press Association v. Stuart, 427 U.S. 539 (1976), the court was called upon to decide whether news reportage of a lurid mass murder case in a small town in Nebraska would justify prior restraint in order to protect the defendant's right to a fair trial. In this case, the court ruled unanimously that it would not. Most of the justices viewed Near as providing the only grounds for prior restraint, and declined to expand its scope any further.

== Trial ==
=== Morland's research ===
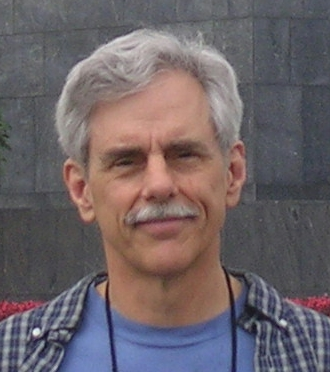
Howard Morland in 2008

The Progressive was a left-wing American monthly magazine of politics, culture and opinion with a circulation of around 40,000. In 1978, its managing editor, Sam Day Jr., a former editor of the Bulletin of the Atomic Scientists, and its editor, Erwin Knoll, commissioned freelance journalist Howard Morland to write an article on the secrecy surrounding nuclear weapons production in America. In October 1978, Morland got Representative Ronald V. Dellums to submit a series of questions about plutonium production to the Department of Energy (DOE), the successor to the AEC. The DOE responded by classifying the questions. In September and October 1978, the House Armed Services Committee held hearings on the proposed Comprehensive Nuclear-Test-Ban Treaty. There was widespread public ignorance of issues surrounding nuclear weapons, and associated environmental concerns. Day and Morland hoped that by demystifying nuclear weapons, they would promote more critical public debate, and improve the prospects for nuclear disarmament. Morland claimed that "I am precisely the type of person the First Amendment was intended to protect: a political advocate whose ideas are unpopular with the general public and threatening to the government."

Over a period of six months, Morland systematically pieced together a design for a hydrogen bomb. He visited a number of nuclear weapons facilities and interviewed government employees, with the permission of the DOE, usually identifying himself and his purpose. He did not have a security clearance, and had never had any access to classified nuclear weapons documents, although it is possible that some classified information or ideas were accidentally or deliberately leaked to him. His scientific background was minimal; he had taken five undergraduate courses in physics and chemistry as part of his Bachelor of Arts degree in economics at Emory University. Morland identified the features of the Teller–Ulam design as staging, with a fission primary and a fusion secondary inside opposite ends of a hollow container, and the use of radiation from the exploding primary to compress, or implode, the secondary. "The notion that X-rays could move solid objects with the force of thousands of tons of dynamite," noted Morland, "was beyond the grasp of the science fiction writers of the time."

Day sent draft copies of Morland's article out to reviewers in late 1978 and early 1979, including Ron Siegel, a graduate student at Massachusetts Institute of Technology. Siegel gave his draft copy to George Rathjens, a professor of political science there in February 1979. For many years, Rathjens had issued a challenge to his graduate students to produce a workable design for a hydrogen bomb, but no one had ever succeeded. Rathjens phoned The Progressive and urged that the article not be published. When the editors dismissed his suggestion, he sent the draft to the DOE. "Apparently," wrote Morland, "I had earned a passing grade on the Rathjens challenge".

=== Legal arguments ===
In March 1979, the editors sent a final draft to the DOE for comment. DOE officials, first in phone calls and then in person, attempted to dissuade The Progressive from publishing the article on the grounds that it contained "secret restricted data" as defined by the Atomic Energy Act. The Progressive's editors were not persuaded, and told the officials that they intended to proceed with publishing Morland's article. The DOE on March 8, 1979, asked the United States District Court for the Western District of Wisconsin in Madison for a temporary restraining order against publication of the article. There was only one judge in the Western District of Wisconsin at the time, Judge James Edward Doyle, but he recused himself as a friend of the magazine. The case was therefore brought before Judge Robert W. Warren, a judge in the Eastern District of Wisconsin, and heard by Warren in Milwaukee.

The cover of the November 1979 issue of The Progressive, which the United States Department of Energy attempted to censor

Lawyers for The Progressive voluntarily underwent security reviews and were granted Q clearances that allowed them to access restricted nuclear information. Morland and The Progressive's editors declined to obtain clearances, as they would have had to sign non-disclosure agreements that would have prevented them from publishing the article. This resulted in the lawyers being restricted in their communications with their clients.

In seeking a temporary restraining order, government lawyers argued that The Progressive was about to break the law, causing irreparable harm. The data in the article was born classified, so it did not matter that it was an original work of the author. They noted that prior restraint had been upheld by the courts before in matters of national security, and argued that the Pentagon Papers decision did not apply as the Atomic Energy Act specifically allowed for injunctive relief. Moreover, the Pentagon Papers were historical, whereas the hydrogen bomb was a current military weapon. Finally, they pointed out that the government had obligations under the Nuclear Non-Proliferation Treaty not to assist non-nuclear states in acquiring nuclear weapons. In granting the temporary restraining order on March 9, Warren said that he would have "to think long and hard before I gave the hydrogen bomb to Idi Amin."

James R. Schlesinger, the Secretary of Energy, telephoned leading newspapers and warned them not to support The Progressive. This was probably unnecessary, for the media were supportive of the government's case. Fred Graham, the New York Times's legal correspondent, predicted that the government would win the case. In an editorial on March 11, 1979, The Washington Post wrote that The Progressive case, "as a press-versus-government First Amendment contest, is John Mitchell's dream case—the one the Nixon Administration was never lucky enough to get: a real First Amendment loser." The newspaper called on The Progressive to "forget about publishing it". In the Pentagon Papers case, Professor Alexander Bickel, an expert on the United States Constitution, when asked hypothetically if prior restraint could ever be justified, had told the court that he would draw the line at the hydrogen bomb. Daniel Ellsberg, who had leaked the Pentagon Papers, told Morland that he believed that nuclear weapon designs should be kept secret. Because of the horrific nature of thermonuclear weapons, and the expectation that The Progressive would probably lose the case, mainstream media organizations feared that the result would be an erosion of freedom of the press.

However, the court's role was to rule on whether publication was legal, not whether it was wise. In keeping with the usual practice of keeping a temporary restraining order in effect for as short a time as possible, Warren ordered that hearings be held on a preliminary injunction one week after the March 9 temporary restraining order. On March 16, the Progressive's attorneys filed an affidavit from Theodore Postol, an employee of the Department of Energy's Argonne National Laboratory, stating that the information contained in the Morland article could be derived by any competent physicist from Teller's article on the hydrogen bomb in the Encyclopedia Americana. At the request of both parties, the hearing was postponed to March 26 so they would have more time to file their briefs and affidavits. The parties were therefore back in court again on March 26 for a hearing on the government's request for a preliminary injunction. Warren decided not to hold an evidentiary hearing at which the opposing teams of experts could be cross examined. He also declined a suggestion by the Federation of American Scientists in its amicus curiae brief that a panel of experts be charged with examining the issue. The case relied on written affidavits and briefs, and the opposing counsels' oral arguments.

Testimony was introduced entirely in the form of sworn affidavits, the most important of which were deemed classified and presented to the court in camera. The government affiants included classification officers, weapon lab scientists, the Secretaries of Energy, State, and Defense, and Nobel physics laureate Hans Bethe, whom Judge Warren cited as the star witness for the plaintiff. The defense side had no experts with direct knowledge of nuclear weapon design, until the unexpected appearance of Ray Kidder, a nuclear weapon designer at the Lawrence Livermore National Laboratory. One of Kidder's jobs in 1962 had been to evaluate designs of the 29 thermonuclear devices tested in Operation Dominic. Kidder was able to credibly dispute government arguments in the battle of affidavits, leveling the technical playing field. Because of the importance of radiation implosion in civilian fusion research, Kidder had been quietly waging a campaign to declassify it for some years prior to the Progressive case.

The Progressive's legal team argued that the government had not established a case sufficient "to overcome the First Amendment's presumption against prior restraint". The article was based upon information in the public domain, and was therefore neither a threat to national security nor covered by the Atomic Energy Act, which in any case did not authorize prior restraint, or was unconstitutional if it did. In this, counsel relied on the United States v. Heine decision, in which Judge Learned Hand ruled that information in the public domain could not be covered by the Espionage Act of 1917. The government's lawyers argued, on the contrary, that there was sensitive information in the article, which was not in the public domain, and which, if published, would harm arms control efforts.

In attempting to apply the Near and Pentagon Papers standards, the court was concerned about the prospect of publication causing the proliferation of nuclear weapons, and potentially a global nuclear holocaust. The government did not go so far as to claim that publication might pose an immediate or inevitable danger, only that it "would substantially increase the risk that thermonuclear weapons would become available or available at an earlier date to those who do not now have them. If this should occur, it would undermine our nonproliferation policy, irreparably impair the national security of the United States, and pose a threat to the peace and security of the world." However, the court still found that "a mistake in ruling against the United States could pave the way for thermonuclear annihilation for us all. In that event, our right to life is extinguished and the right to publish becomes moot", and that publication could indeed cause "grave, direct, immediate and irreparable harm to the United States", thereby meeting the test the Supreme Court had enunciated in the Pentagon Papers case. The preliminary injunction was therefore granted.

Lawyers for The Progressive filed a motion to vacate the decision on the grounds that the information contained in Morland's article was already in the public domain. The basis for this claim was two reports from the Lawrence Livermore National Laboratory UCRL-4725, "Weapons Development During June 1956", and UCRL-5280, "Weapons Development During June 1958", which contained detailed information on thermonuclear weapon design. One of them, UCRL-4725, gave details about Bassoon, a three-stage thermonuclear device tested during Operation Redwing in 1956. It was found on the shelves of the Los Alamos library by Dmitri Rotow, a researcher for the American Civil Liberties Union. According to the government, the reports had been inadvertently declassified. On June 15, Warren therefore denied the motion on the grounds that such an error did not place the documents in the public domain. The appellants immediately appealed to the Seventh Circuit Court of Appeals in Chicago, claiming that the two documents had been on the shelves for a considerable period of time. The government now advanced the argument that "technical data" was not protected by the First Amendment. The motions for an expedited review were denied because the magazine's lawyers had waived that right—something Morland and The Progressive editors discovered only from the court. The preliminary injunction therefore remained in effect for six months.

=== Case dropped ===
On April 25, 1979, a group of scientists who worked at the Argonne National Laboratory wrote to Senator John Glenn, the Chairman of the United States Senate Subcommittee on Energy, Nuclear Proliferation and Federal Services. They were concerned about information being leaked, in particular by the government's tacit acknowledgement that Morland's bomb design was substantially correct, something that could not otherwise have been deduced from unclassified information. These included the affidavits by the United States Secretary of Defense Harold Brown and government expert witness Jack Rosengren. Copies of the letter were sent to major newspapers, but with a cover note explaining that it was for background information and not publication. After about four weeks, the Glenn subcommittee forwarded it to the DOE, which classified it.

Unaware of this, Hugh DeWitt, a physicist at the Lawrence Livermore nuclear weapons laboratory, forwarded a copy to Chuck Hansen. Hansen was a computer programmer from Mountain View, California, who collected information about nuclear weapons as a hobby. He had run a competition to design an H-bomb, the winner of which would be the first person to have their design classified by the DOE. It now began to occur to him that his hobby might not be legal. On August 27, he wrote a letter to Senator Charles H. Percy detailing how much information he had deduced from publicly available sources. This included his own design, one not as good as Morland's, which Hansen had not seen. Hansen further charged that government scientists—including Edward Teller, Ted Taylor, and George Rathjens—had leaked sensitive information about thermonuclear weapons, for which no action had been taken. In this, Hansen was mistaken: Taylor had indeed been reprimanded, and Teller was not the source of the information that Hansen attributed to him. Hansen made copies of his letter available to several newspapers.

When The Daily Californian (the student-run college newspaper of the University of California at Berkeley), published excerpts from the Argonne letter on June 11, the DOE obtained a court order to prevent further publication. Undeterred, The Daily Californian published the Argonne letter in its entirety on June 13. In September, the DOE declared the Hansen letter to be classified and obtained a temporary restraining order prohibiting The Daily Californian from publishing it, but the Hansen letter was published by the Madison Press Connection on September 16. The government then moved to dismiss their cases against both The Progressive and The Daily Californian as moot.

== Legacy ==
Morland's article was published in the November 1979 issue of The Progressive. A month later he published an erratum in The Progressive with updates based on information that he had gathered during the trial from UCRL-4725, Chuck Hansen's letter and other sources. In Morland's opinion, the article contributed to a wave of anti-nuclear activism in the late 1970s and early 1980s that resulted in, amongst other things, the closure of the Rocky Flats Plant near Denver. Chuck Hansen went on to publish a book, U.S. Nuclear Weapons: The Secret History, in 1988. This was subsequently expanded to a self-published five volume work entitled Swords of Armageddon. However, many mainstream media organizations still remained reluctant to test the law by publishing. On September 30, 1980, the Justice Department issued a statement that it would not prosecute alleged violations of the Atomic Energy Act during the Daily Californian or The Progressive cases.

Hearings on the case were held by Glenn's subcommittee and by the House Subcommittee on Government Information and Individual Rights. The subcommittees looked into the implications of the decision with regards to nuclear proliferation. They also examined the doctrine of "classified at birth", but did not decide to amend the Atomic Energy Act to remove such provisions. Thus far, fears of thermonuclear proliferation have not proven founded; whether any country has successfully developed a hydrogen bomb since 1979 is disputed.

From a legal standpoint, the case "proved to be a victory for no one", due to the indecisive nature of its conclusion. Yet it remains a celebrated case nonetheless. In 2004, the 25th anniversary of the decision was commemorated with an academic conference at the Benjamin N. Cardozo School of Law, attended by many of the participants, at which papers were presented. Law students still study the case, which "could have been a law school hypothetical designed to test the limits of the presumption of unconstitutionality attached to prior restraints."
