= Howard Morland =

American journalist

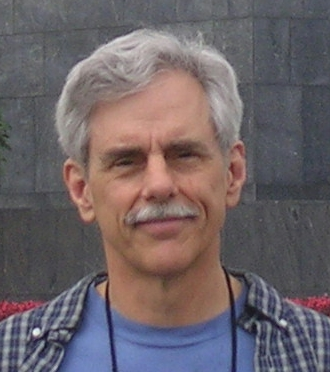
- Born: September 14, 1942 (age 83); Birmingham, Alabama, U.S.
- Education: Emory University
- Occupations: journalist, author, activist

Howard Morland (born September 14, 1942) is an American journalist and activist against nuclear weapons who, in 1979, became famous for apparently discovering the "secret" of the hydrogen bomb (the Teller–Ulam design) and publishing it after a lengthy censorship attempt by the Department of Energy (United States v. The Progressive). Because of some similarities in experience, he became outspoken in the protest against the detention of Mordechai Vanunu.

== Career ==
Morland graduated from Emory University in 1965 and entered Air Force pilot training, at Lubbock, Texas, aspiring to a career in astronautics or commercial aviation. As a C-141 jet transport pilot, he was trained to carry nuclear weapons as cargo. He noted that the full-size bomb casings used in training were astonishingly small, of a size that could easily be mishandled.

His wartime assignment was flying from California to Vietnam two to three times a month, returning with combat veterans and the bodies of soldiers who were killed in the war. Having opposed the war since before it began, he left the Air Force and embarked on a two-year trip around the world starting and ending in Hawaii. In fifteen months abroad, he passed through two dozen countries of southern Asia, the Middle East, and Europe, acquiring a personal feel for cultural diversity and global issues. Back in Hawaii, he surfed big waves and flew ten-passenger "Twin Beech" aircraft on all-island aerial tours. As a flight instructor, he developed a novel method of teaching new students to land an airplane by the end of the first lesson.

When Dennis Meadows, co-author of The Limits to Growth, gave a lecture in Honolulu, Morland took him surfing and was invited to join his new graduate study program at Dartmouth, where, after a year of course work, Morland joined the New England anti-nuclear Clamshell Alliance and became a full-time organizer. His objection to nuclear power was its potential for reactor melt-down, but his real concern was nuclear weapons, which he wanted to see abolished worldwide.

In 1978, magazine editor Samuel H. Day recruited Morland to write a series of articles on nuclear weapons for The Progressive, a magazine based in Madison, Wisconsin. The federal government tried to halt publication of his second article, "The H-Bomb Secret: How We Got It, Why We're Telling It", taking the magazine to court. Publication was blocked for six months by government intervention which provoked a landmark First Amendment legal case, United States v. The Progressive. The government's case for censorship collapsed when the information in question was shown to be in the public domain. Ironically, the court case produced new information that enabled Morland to correct a number of errors in his original article.

The article is often erroneously described as a set of instructions for building a thermonuclear bomb. Morland has responded that such a bomb could only be built by a nation state; moreover, the information is conceptual — no engineering details are provided in the article. According to Morland, the article's purpose was to help energize the Ban-the-bomb movement and merge it with the broader Anti-nuclear movement.

During the 1980s Morland worked on Capitol Hill as an arms-control lobbyist with the Coalition for a New Foreign and Military Policy, a group that (under a slightly different name) had played a key role in forcing the House of Representatives to begin publishing recorded vote tallies on amendments to bills during the Vietnam war era. Morland published the group's annual voting record, wrote articles, toured the college and activist lecture circuits, was active in the Nuclear Weapons Freeze Campaign, and specialized in connecting activists from the most liberal, i.e., most urbanized, Congressional districts to an annual effort to de-fund the Navy's Trident II D-5 ballistic missile. At the end of the decade, he worked at the House of Representatives, as the military legislative analyst for the liberal Democratic Study Group.

After the Cold War ended, he created multi-media training programs for a company started by a graduate school colleague, and started his own residential carpentry company, Morland Designs. In retirement, he participates in kayak races and works on Wikipedia articles about nuclear weapons and kayaking.

His wife, Barbara Morland, retired in 2017 from a thirty-year career at the Library of Congress, the last twenty years as head of the Main Reading Room. They have two daughters and four grandchildren.

== See also ==
- List of books about nuclear issues
- List of nuclear whistleblowers
- List of peace activists
- Nuclear disarmament
- Nuclear weapons and the United States
- Nevada Test Site
- Alvin C. Graves
- National Security Archive
