= MWPA =

MWPA may refer to:

- Michigan Woman's Press Association, an American professional association for women writers and journalists in Michigan
- Military Whistleblower Protection Act, an American law providing protection of lawful disclosures of illegal activity by members of the US military
