= Farmworkers in the United States =

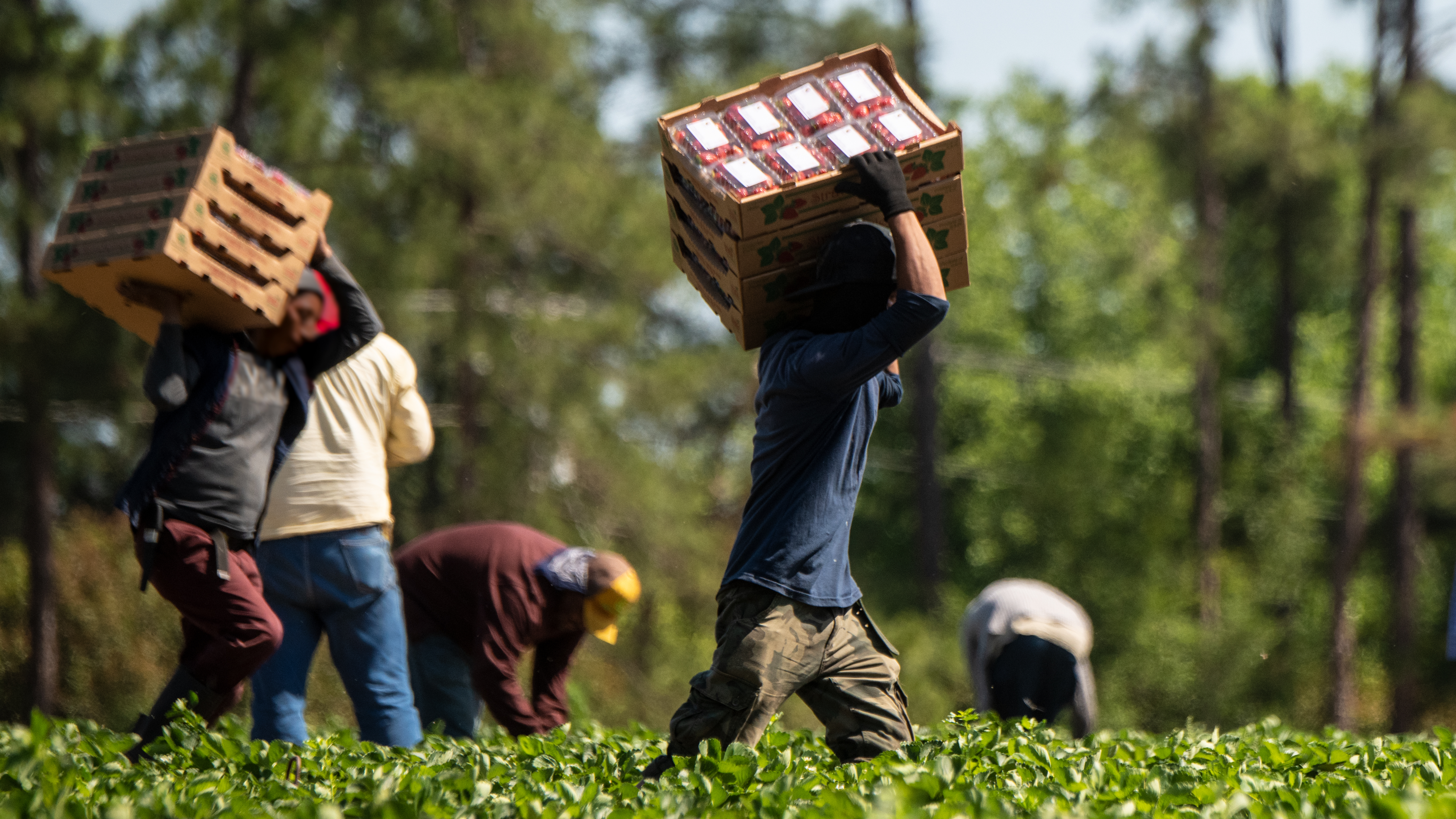
Farmworkers in Fort Valley, Georgia in 2019

Farmworkers in the United States have unique demographics, wages, working conditions, organizing, and environmental aspects. According to the National Institute for Occupational Safety and Health, approximately 2,112,626 full-time workers were employed in production agriculture in the U.S. in 2019 and approximately 1.4 to 2.1 million hired crop workers are employed annually on crop farms in the U.S. In 2025, the Department of Agriculture found the average age among farmworkers to be 39.6 years old, the average wage to be $17.23 per hour, and the average number of hours worked to be 40.8 per week.

The types of farmworkers include field crop workers, nursery workers, greenhouse workers, supervisors, etc. The Department of Labor findings for the years 2019–2020 report that 63% of crop workers were born in Mexico, 30% in the mainland United States or Puerto Rico, 5% in Central America, and 2 percent in other regions. The amount of farm labor in the United States has changed substantially: in 1870, almost 50 percent of the U.S. population was employed in agriculture; as of 2025, less than 1% of the population was directly employed in agriculture.

Potential health and safety issues that may be associated with farm work include vehicle rollovers, falls, musculoskeletal injuries, hazardous equipment, grain bins, pesticides, unsanitary conditions, and respiratory disease. According to the United States Department Of Labor, farmworkers are at risk of work-related lung diseases, noise-induced hearing loss, skin diseases, and certain cancers related to chemical use. Farm workers also suffer disproportionately from heat stress, with fewer than average seeking treatment. While some progress has been made, many farmworkers continue to struggle for fair pay, proper training, and safe working conditions.

== Farm structure ==
The development of a particular kind of agriculture is dependent on the characteristics of the farming region. The soil type, climate, slope, and distance to markets all help in shaping the type of agriculture that thrives in any particular region. For instance, the Midwestern United States has rich, fertile soil, and so it produces corn, soybeans, cattle, hogs, and dairy products and has become known as the Corn Belt of America. In contrast, agriculture in California's Mediterranean and moderate climate produces more than half of the nation's fruits, vegetables, and nuts, which require hand-harvesting and a large labor force.

Over the last century the amount of farmland in production has remained relatively steady, but the number of operating farms has continually dropped, signifying a consolidation of farm enterprises. Around the 1930s hard economic times hit the country with the Great Depression and the Dust Bowl era, forcing some farmers off the land. From 1950 to 2001 the amount of U.S. farm land used for major agricultural crop production has remained about the same while over half of the farms are gone. A farm's reliance on farmworkers greatly depends on the quantity and the type of crop in production. Some crops require more labor than others, and in California, many labor-intensive crops are produced such as dairy products, fruits, tree nuts and vegetables. Although the domestic farm labor force has decreased in the last century, the proportion of hired workers has grown. Increased competition among agricultural producers and consolidation have created a need for a large, inexpensive, and temporary workforce that increasingly comes from abroad.

== Demographics ==
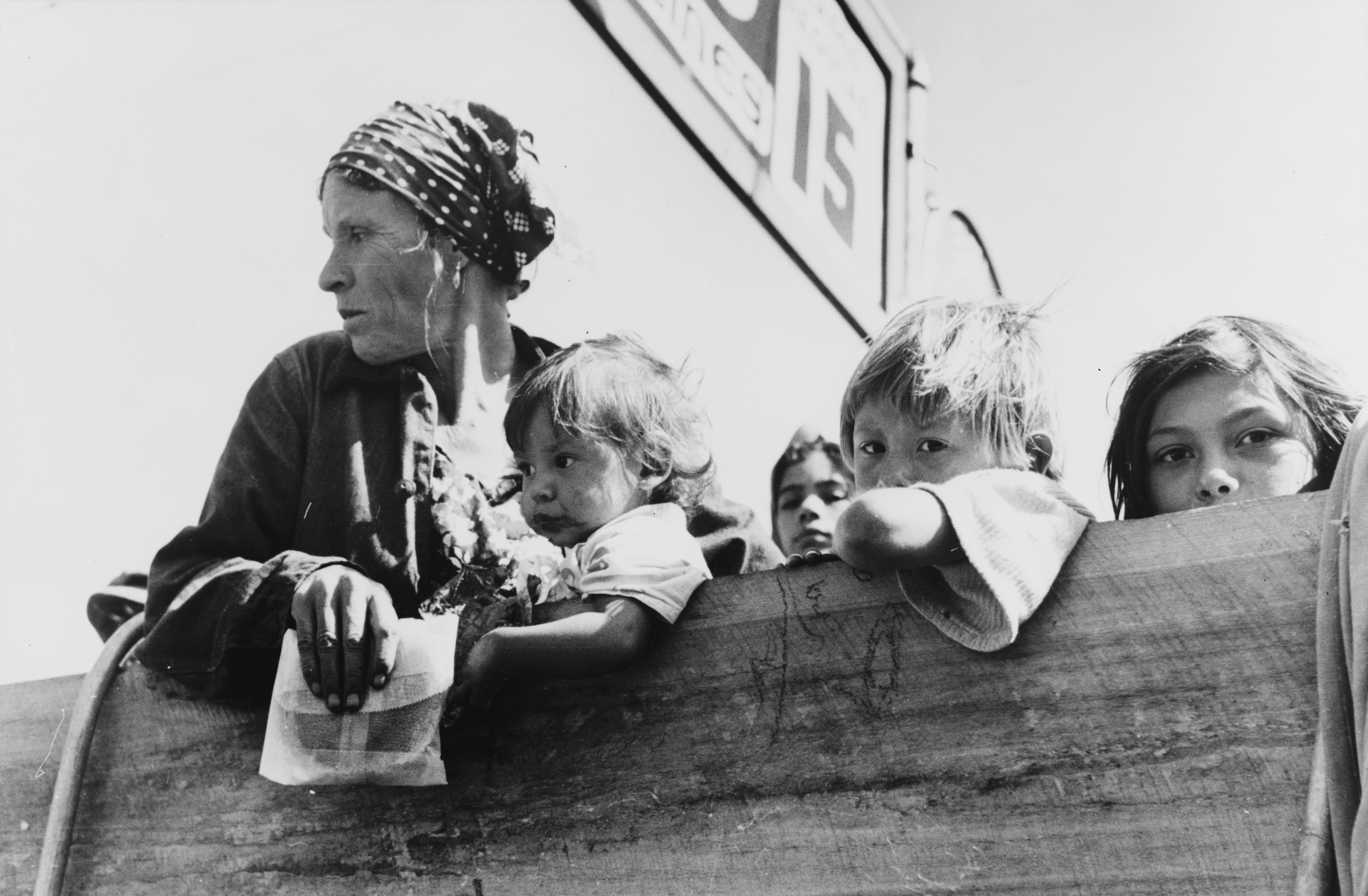
Mexican American worker, circa 1939

According to the National Center for Farmworker Health in 2012, there were an estimated 3 million migrant and seasonal farmworkers in the United States. Migrant farmworkers are considered to be temporary workers who move to an area for work, cultivating a crop during the harvest season. Seasonal farm workers, however, live in an area from year to year. The states with the highest percentage of both migrant and seasonal farm workers include; California, Florida, Oregon, North Carolina, and Washington. The Agricultural Resource Management Survey conducted by the USDA found that one third of the farm worker population is between the ages of 35–54 years old with an average age of 33.

The Department of Labor and Statistics discovered that the median pay is averaged to be $40,260 a year and $19.53 per hour in 2023 for farmworkers. According to the 2021-2022 National Agricultural Workers Survey (NAWS), 42.03% of U.S. crop workers are legally unauthorized to work. The majority were born in Mexico (60.65%) and 31.57% were born in the U.S. Since 1991 to 2001, the general trend is an overall increase in the number of foreign born, unauthorized farm workers. The U.S. Department of Labor has reported in the National Agricultural Workers Survey that the number of foreign born, unauthorized farm workers has plateaued and kept steady over the past decade around 50%. In 2014, 40% of foreign-born farmworkers had been in the US for over 20 years and 35% had been in the US for 10 to 19 years. In 2022, two-thirds of U.S. agricultural workers were noncitizen immigrants.

In 2009, about 519,000 people under age 20 worked on farms owned by their family. In addition to the youth who lived on family farms, an additional 230,000 youth were employed in agriculture. In 2004, women made up approximately 24% of farmers; that year, there were 580,000 women employed in agriculture, forestry, and fishing.

An ongoing issue across the country is the young children who work in the agriculture fields. According to a report conducted by the Human Rights Watch, there was a notice in labor protections towards children who work in agriculture and the children who work in other industries, which was that the children who work in agriculture don't receive the same protection and benefits to those in other workplace in the United States. When it comes to working in the fields, children as young as twelve years old are legally allowed to work as long as they have their parent's consent. On the other hand, in other industries, children aren't even allowed to work until they've turned 14, or at the age of 16 depending on the labor regulation and the location they're located in. Due to the fewer protection a children receives on the field camp, is what leaves them along with their parents or other adults in a position where they are constantly vulnerable to being exploited and in unsafe working conditions.

The effect in which the young agricultural workers have doesn't just stop in the fields, it goes well beyond into their education. Often times, these children are required to work on their school days off, whether it is a weekend or a holiday. A recurring result caught by the Human Rights Watch was children farmworkers often time have hard times obtaining concepts taught in classrooms and are likely to dropout more. In several interview conductions they done, a common thing the students experienced was them having to migrate to another state for seasonal farmworker, causing them to leave their school before that academic school year ended. At such young age, these farmworkers are forced to balance both education and work. The reasonings for having to work is what creates educational inequalities for these young agricultural workers.

In the interview Human Rights Watch conducted, the children spoke out on the physical and economic pressures that drove them to work in the fields. These elementary and middle school age kids had to endure long hours under the scorching hot sun, heavy lifting, and other severe conditions. A twelve year old in North Carolina explained that after working for five to six hours, the earning for those hours turned out to be only about eighteen dollars, low pay. A parent's economic struggle is another reason for why most children are required to work, to help contribute and pay the bills. Despite the economic pressures to work, these children are at risk to any kind of injury, whether chronic pain or injury from machinery.

Substantial demographic change among farmworkers has occurred since the mid-20th Century. In 1870, almost 50 percent of the U.S. population was employed in agriculture. In 1954, there were 2.73 million hired agricultural workers in the US The 61 percent reduction in farmworker numbers between then and 2012 occurred despite an agricultural output increase of about 140 percent, serving a population that increased by 93 percent over that period. Whereas 74.7 percent of hired farmworkers were seasonal in 1954, 74 percent were year-round employees in 2012.

=== African American Farmworkers ===
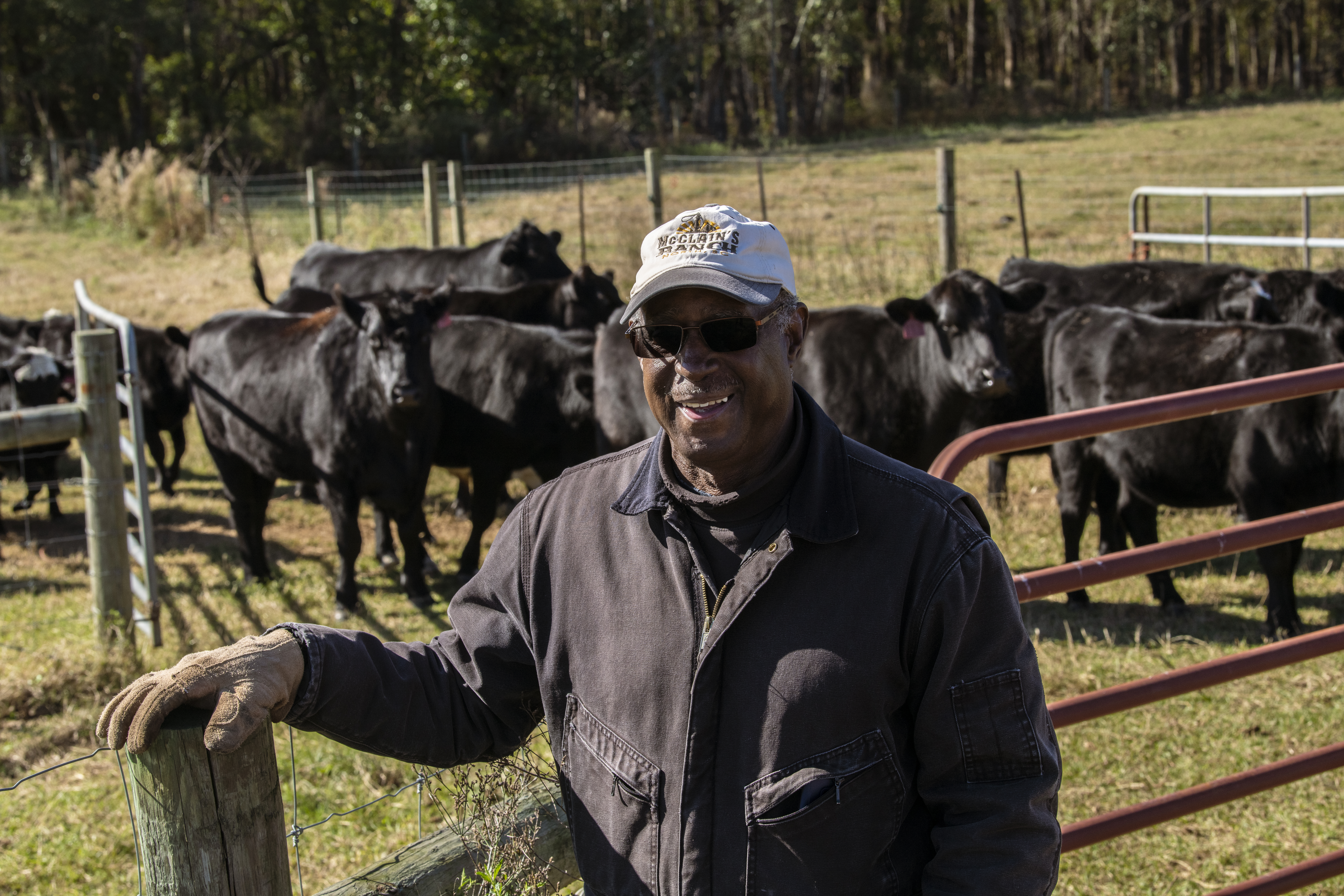
Angus hybrid cattle gather around Flying Leatherneck Ranch owner Jim McClain in Orangeburg, South Carolina.

African American farmworkers played a huge role in the farm work done as early as 1865 and well into the 1960s. According to the United States Department of Agriculture, finding and owning land has been a constant struggle for many African American farmers. One of the first opportunities for financial freedom and stability after being emancipated for former slaves was going into farmwork using the knowledge they had.

== Wages ==
According to the US Department of Agriculture, the average wage rate for US [hired] agricultural field and livestock workers in 2014 was $11.29 per hour. This figure does not include the average value of perquisites, such as cash bonuses, housing or meals that are provided to some agricultural workers. The average exceeded the median.

For 2014, the median hourly wages of $9.17 for "Farmworkers and Laborers, Crop, Nursery, and Greenhouse" and $11.02 for "Farmworkers, Farm, Ranch, and Aquacultural Animals" can be compared with the median for all US occupations of $17.09, and with the federally mandated minimum wage of $7.25 per hour. In 2014, of US private sector workers paid hourly wages, the fraction paid less than minimum wage was 1.3 percent of workers in "agriculture and related industries", versus 2.5 percent of those in "nonagricultural industries".

In 2014, for US "Farmworkers and Laborers, Crop, Nursery and Greenhouse", the median annual wage was $19,060. The 10th and 90th percentiles were $17,280 and $27,890, respectively. For "Farmworkers, Farm, Ranch and Aquacultural Animals" the median annual wage was $22,930. The 10th and 90th percentiles were $17,080 and $37,360, respectively. These figures can be compared with some of the poverty thresholds for 2014 published by the US Census Bureau: single person under 65: $12,316; two people (householder under 65): $15,835; same, but with one child under 18: $16,317.

== Working conditions and workplace issues ==
For most agricultural workers, much work is outdoors and may involve extremes of weather. Crop harvesting may require bending and crouching. Because machinery and animals can cause injury, workers must take precautions and be alert. Although crop workers may risk exposure to pesticides, exposure can be minimal if appropriate safety precautions are followed.

Heat stress is a serious concern. Heat-related illness is often mistakenly characterized by death only, however heat-related illness very much resembles an exposure-response curve, where severity worsens as exposure increases and persists. As a typical exposure-response relationship suggests, conditions become more debilitating with prolonged heat exposure. Ultimately, heat-related illness encompasses a variety of symptoms and conditions. The first, most mild stage is heat cramps, and as heat stress persists severity increases to heat syncope, heat cramps, heat exhaustion, then heat stroke. Unfortunately, sufficient data is not available on the intermediate phases with respect to farmworkers. This is because the Bureau of Labor Statistics' Survey on Occupational Injuries and Illnesses collects OSHA reportable cases only when they result in one or more days lost in work, and agricultural workers have some of the lowest report rates. This is assumed because most workers do not report any cases less severe than heat exhaustion and typically treat themselves in the event of any degree of heat-related illness.

According to the Census of Fatal Occupational Injuries, between 2003 and 2008, Agriculture accounted for 20% of heat-related deaths. A common statistic used in expressing the rate at which heat-related death occurs among farmworkers is 0.39 deaths per 100,000 full-time employees in 2008. This fatality rate is astronomical compared to the rate of 0.02 per 100,000 full-time employees in all other industries. A 2015 study found that in the U.S., agricultural workers had a 35-fold increased risk of heat-related death compared to all other industries.

The Centers for Disease Control has recommended: "Agricultural employers should develop and implement heat stress management measures that include 1) training for field supervisors and employees to prevent, recognize, and treat heat illness, 2) implementing a heat acclimatization program...3) encouraging proper hydration with proper amounts and types of fluids, 4) establishing work/rest schedules appropriate for the current heat indices, 5) ensuring access to shade or cooling areas, 6) monitoring the environment and workers during hot conditions by assessing heat stress conditions and individual heat strain status using Large-face thermometers, military style flag systems that indicate current conditions, tools to measure heart rate and assess hydration sufficiency, also providing workers training to avoid heat-illness and recognize the symptoms in themselves and other coworkers, and 7) providing prompt medical attention to workers who show signs of heat illness..."

Potential health and safety issues that may be associated with farm work also include vehicle rollovers, falls, musculoskeletal injuries, hazardous equipment, grain bins, pesticides, unsanitary conditions, and respiratory disease among others.

In 1998–99, 468 individuals employed in agriculture were identified with acute occupational pesticide-related illness in six states participating in the SENSOR program (AZ, CA, FL, NY, OR, TX), which include states where large numbers of crop farmworkers are employed. This compares with 441 individuals employed in non-agricultural occupations who were identified with acute occupational pesticide-related illness in those states. The US Environmental Protection Agency's Worker Safety Program provides educational materials facilitating implementation of the Agricultural Worker Protection Standard established under federal regulation. In 2009–2010, NAWS (the National Agricultural Workers Survey, conducted under the US Bureau of Labor Statistics) found that 84 percent of workers received training in safe use of pesticides within the past 12 months from their current employers.

NAWS found that "Almost all farm workers reported that their current farm employer made drinking water, toilets and washing water available on a daily basis. Of the small percentage of farm workers who reported not using the employer-provided toilets on a daily basis (3% in 1999–2000), three-fourths indicated that the bathroom was 'too far away' to use."

The survey asked: If you are injured at work or get sick as a result of your work, does your employer provide health insurance or pay for your health care? In 2009–2010, 74 percent of survey farmworkers answered yes, 15 percent did not know. In 2007–2008, 60 percent of farmworkers considered it "easy" to get access to US health care.

Healthcare and labor inequalities are two main things that often get overlooked when it is for those individuals who work in agricultural fields. Researchers from Johns Hopkins Center for a Livable Future, explained that some of the challenges related to healthcare are transportation, immigration status, and all the additional cost it comes with. For undocumented farmworkers it's more difficult since they don't have the access to those who have legal status. Additionally, most employers don't provide health insurance coverage to workers which leaves these workers to pay out of pocket or prevent them from getting medical treatment because of the expenses.

Furthermore, the report also discusses the housing conditions farmworkers experience. Due to the low paying jobs in any sector in agricultural, most individuals do not have enough to live suitable, having a shelter is enough to pay. The researches who conducted the report determined that farmworkers often time live in overcrowded conditions with poor water quality, lack of heat, and other poor housing situations. With these poor housing conditions continuing to exist, the health issues for farmworkers continue to sky rocket. With this, it becomes clear that the housing situation correlates to the low pay working conditions the farmworker communities experience.

In 1999–2000, roughly 2 per hundred farmworkers 18 and older reported having been a victim of violence (e.g. pushed, slapped, hit, etc.) within the past year, whereas violent crime victimizations were 2.61 per hundred of the US population in 2012. In 1999–2000, roughly 0.14 percent of farmworkers 18 and older reported having been a victim of workplace violence within the past year, whereas the rate of workplace violence was 0.5 percent for all US employed persons over the age of 16 in 2005–2009. Sexual harassment and sexual exploitation of female farmworkers have been reported and are an important concern. However, there is a dearth of statistics to indicate the extent of these abuses, and undocumented foreign workers may be especially reluctant to report them.

This brings up the issues of a rise in farm workers being abused on farms. From 2003 to 2018, workers filed 1,106 sexual harassment complaints with the commission against agricultural-related industries. The allegations range from verbal harassment to rape. Because many farm workers are immigrants and some are illegal, their abusers are able to get away with abuse using the threat of deportation or firing. In 2018, as a 2013 investigation concluded, a federal jury awarded $17.4 million to five migrant women who said they were raped and sexually harassed by three male supervisors at the Florida packing plant where they worked. This win opened the door for many other women to believe they also have a chance to stand up to their abusers in court and win. The Equal Employment Opportunity Commission is responsible for enforcing civil rights laws in the workplace and is the only federal agency that pursues on-the-job sexual violence and harassment cases. While it is the job of the EEOC to enforce civil rights for these farmworkers, a big issue with the process is getting the workers to come forward and for there to be enough evidence of the assault. In July 2018 Bornt & Sons, Inc. and its former farm labor contractor Barraza Farm Service, LLC / Barraza Farm Service, Inc. paid $300,000 and furnished other relief to settle a sexual harassment and retaliation lawsuit filed by the U.S. Equal Employment Commission. Sexual assault is continually persistent in the world of agriculture. This is due to many factors, one of the main ones being fear of retaliation. It is known that many times farmworkers work in the same fields as other family members. If a woman farmworker decided to speak up and say something not only would it cost her, her job. But it also might affect those she is involved with.

There have been some cases of human slavery and human trafficking among farmworkers. However, some Equal Employment Opportunity Commission claims regarding human trafficking of farmworkers, the subject of widely publicized court cases, were dismissed or rejected by federal courts.

Workers rights cards, in English and Spanish, are produced by the US Department of Labor. The Migrant and Seasonal Agricultural Worker Protection Act establishes standards regarding wages, housing, transportation, disclosures and record-keeping. Among other provisions, the act prohibits retaliatory intimidation or discrimination against a migratory or seasonal worker who, with just cause, has filed a complaint or testifies or asserts a right relating to provisions of the Act. In order to operate legally, farm labor contractors must register with the Department of Labor.

The H-2A program under US Citizenship and Immigration Services allows US employers or agents meeting various requirements to bring in foreign nationals for temporary or seasonal agricultural work. The petitioner must demonstrate that there are not sufficient qualified, able, willing and available US workers for the jobs. Employment of H-2A workers must not adversely affect wages of US workers doing similar jobs.

Despite laws and regulations for protection of farmworkers, concerns persist regarding violations, and regarding the economic status and welfare of many farmworkers.

== Organizing ==
Compared to other workers, organization attempts on the behalf of farm-workers face a double challenge. First, labor laws that apply are not always enforced for agricultural workers. The National Labor Relations Act of 1935, for example, which protects most workers who organize and form trade unions from employer retaliation (e.g., the firing of workers for trying to join a union) and sets up a framework for unions and employers to negotiate in good faith, does not extend to farm workers. Similarly, the Fair Labor Standards Act of 1938, which sets minimum wage and overtime pay requirements does not apply to farm labor. In 1966, the minimum wage requirement, but not the overtime pay, was extended to apply to farm workers who worked on farms where there was over approximately 7 full-time employees in a quarter. Some states such as California, have passed laws guaranteeing the right to organize, but these apply only to the particular state in which the law was passed. A second important challenge faced by farm worker organizers is the vulnerability of the workers due to their immigration status. The non-immigrant status of guest workers, as well as the lack of documentation of many other workers, places them in a politically weak position to address worker injustices. Despite these challenges, there has been an important history of farm worker organizing in the United-States, and farm labor organizing continues to this day both to ensure the enforcement of existing regulation and to create new regulations. Some of the causes that these organizations fight for include:

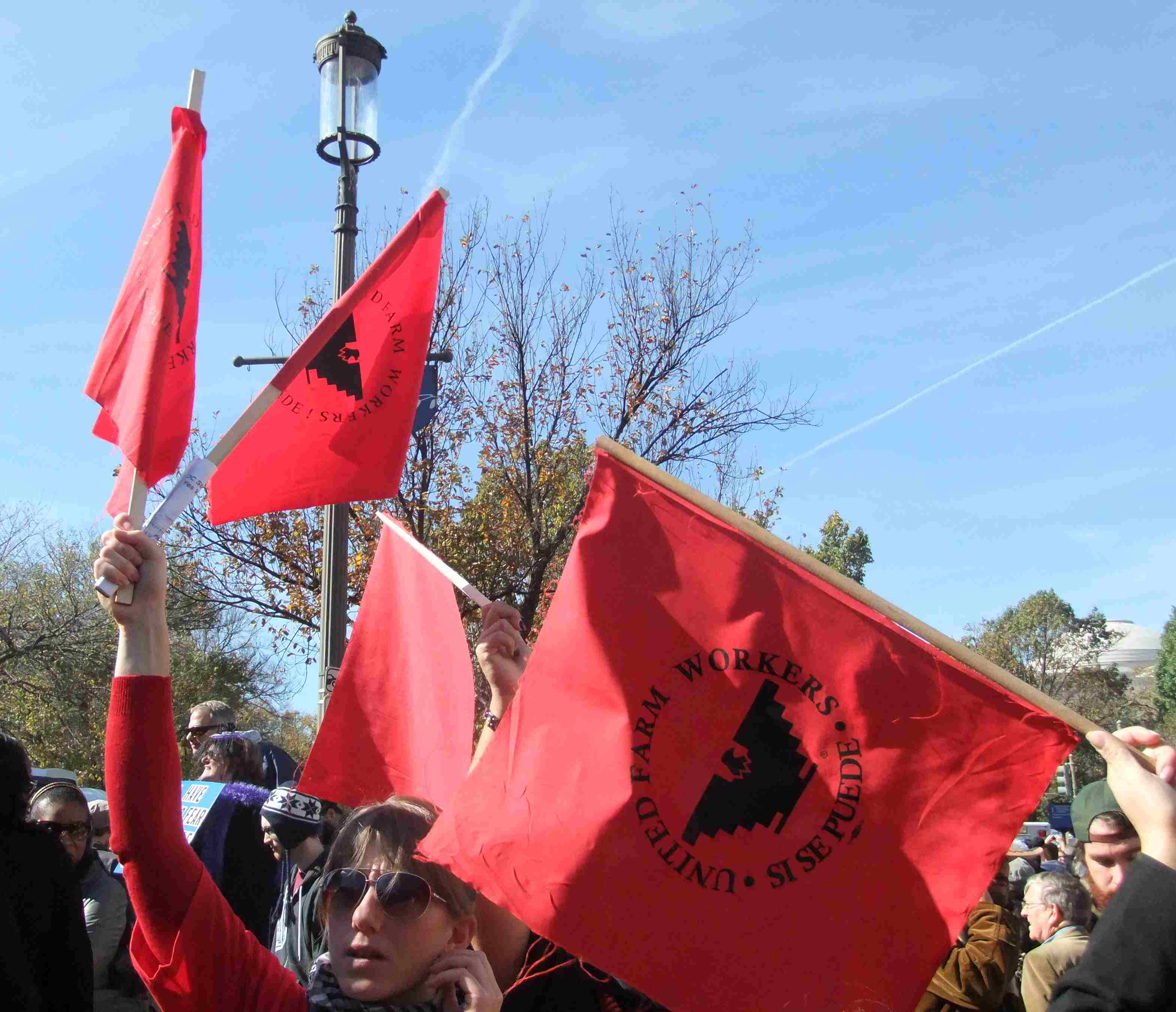
Rally flags at a 2010 protest read 'United Farm Workers. Si Se Puede', translating to 'yes, we can'.

- Free negotiation
- Recognizing workers' rights such as health, wages, and safety
- Fair treatment of undocumented workers
- Fair wages
- Fair trade of product
- Alliances with other organizations and student support
- Good relationship of farmer with buyer
- Protection of children
- Safe housing for workers
- Bias-free policing
- Inclusion in the healthcare system
- Unionization, in some cases
- Education of the community about immigrant workers,

Some of the main organizations associated with the farm workers movement are the United Farm Workers, the Farm Labor Organizing Committee, the Agricultural Justice Project and the Coalition of Immokalee Workers. Many of the issues around which farm workers organize relating to occupational health and safety and labor rights, such as immigration rights and pesticide use on farms, are also socially important issues that affect overall society.

The first approach of organization targets regulation changes by pressuring the government through worker solidarity movements. The UFW, for example, often runs campaigns targeting policy by encouraging citizens to communicate with their government representatives on a variety of issues. As a recent example, on the heels of the death of a young farm worker, the UFW has been encouraging supporters to contact California's governor Arnold Schwarzenegger, to improve the enforcement of existing regulations regarding working in the heat. Despite having the strictest heat laws in the country, heat deaths continue to occur and are largely attributed to a lack of workplace inspectors which results in a low level of compliance.

A second strategy involves targeting high-profile businesses that are supplied through contractors and subcontractors hiring farm workers. Recently, the Coalition for Immokalee Workers, for example, has applied pressure to several companies through consumer boycotts, including McDonald's and Taco Bell. The result of these campaigns were that these companies agreed to pay an extra penny per pound to the farmworkers who picked for them, regardless of the fact that they were employed through subcontractors.

The Fair World Project, launched by the Organic Consumers Association in 2010, is an organization that promotes fair trade practices as well as the labeling of certified products. It also works to educate consumers and the community about fair trade.

=== Farmworker Movement in the 21st Century ===
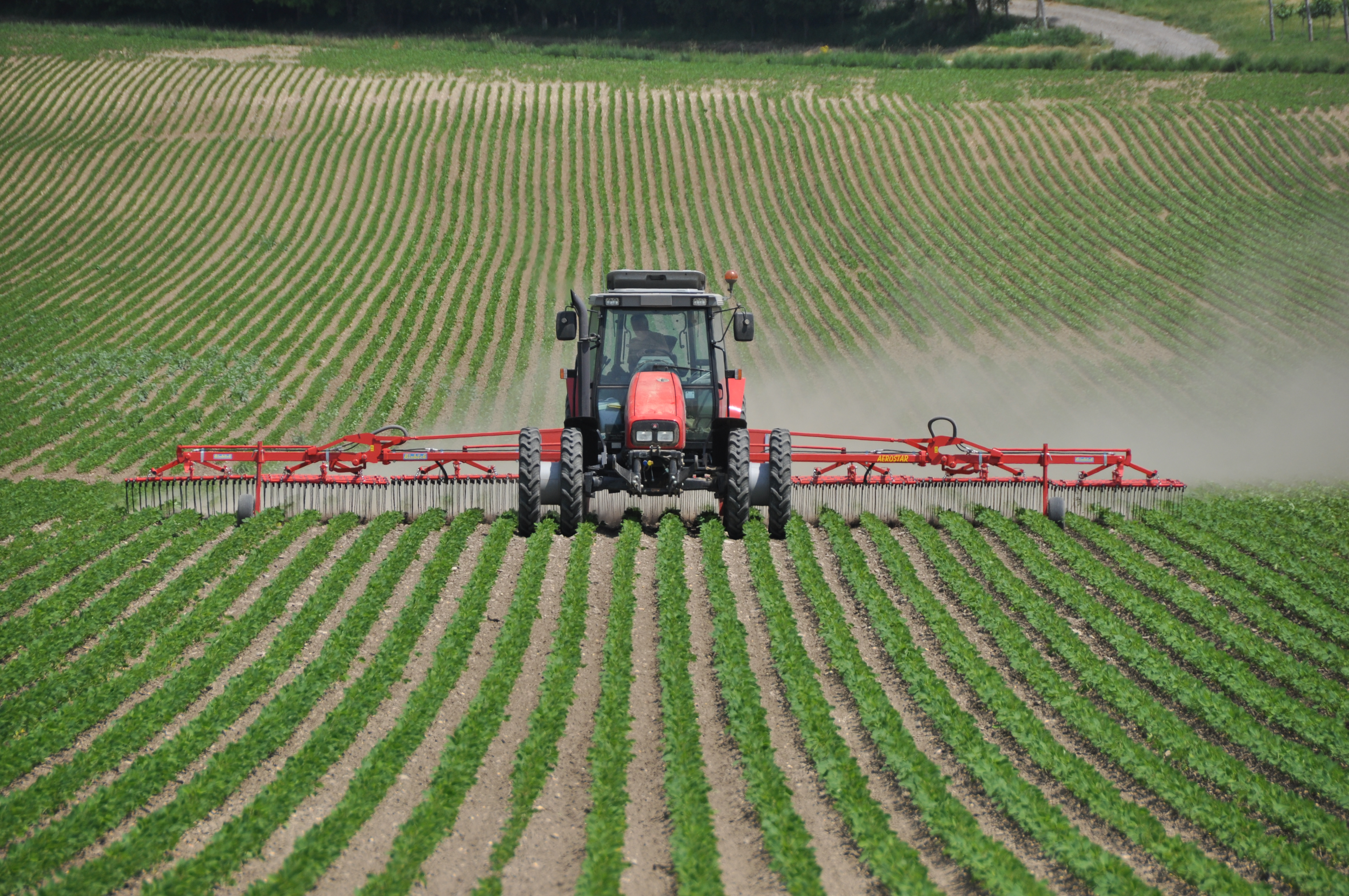
Tined weeder, mechanical weed control, organic farming

The Farmworkers Movement has continued into the 21st century, and has included an emphasis on environmental issues. While there is intersection between both the labor rights and environmental justice efforts within the larger farmworker movement, there have been splits and differences between the two areas. Some critics of the environmental groups which work on similar issues to farmworkers organizations have claimed that they focus on "natural wildlife" rather than on the farmworkers themselves who are exposed the chemicals which are harming the environment. Farmworker Justice is a nonprofit fighting for the rights to better conditions and living wages for farmworkers in the United States. Many farmworkers in the United States have not been able to work under livable working conditions and not only are they affect but their families are as well. They help raise awareness of current issues that affect farmworks in the United States and the solutions that are possible.

In 2021, the Supreme Court of the United States under Cedar Point Nursery v. Hassid struck down the right of organizers to enter farms outside of working hours to unionize workers.

=== Labor rights ===
United States Senator Kamala Harris speaks about the Fairness for Farm Workers Act in 2018.

Organizing efforts within the farmworker community have continued to focus on labor rights and other labor related issues. Organizations such as the United Farm Workers have a history of working to protect the rights of farmworkers; some of the campaigns and causes these organizations work on include heat exposure, wage rights, and overtime inclusion.

Farmworker organizations have been able to achieve legislative success in reaching their goals for greater rights for farmworkers. In 2005, following the deaths of four California farm workers due to extreme summer heat, the United Farm Workers was instrumental in getting former California governor Arnold Schwarzenegger to propose emergency heat stress regulations to prevent possible additional heat-related deaths of outdoor employees and agricultural workers. The proposed regulations required water and shade to be present and available for laborers working outside who felt negatively affected by the heat.

Other legislative impacts and victories for farmworkers include the signing of an overtime law by California governor Jerry Brown in 2016 which extended overtime pay to farm workers who worked past 8 hours in a day or 40 hours in a week. The new rules will be phased-in over the course of four years, beginning in 2019. There has long been a precedent for the exclusion of agricultural workers from other labor right provisions, including the Fair Labor Standards Act of 1938, which had previously created minimum wage and overtime standards for American workers but had excluded all agricultural workers. In California in 1976, the state Industrial Welfare Commission had extended overtime pay to farmworkers but only after 10 hours on a job in a single day or past 60 hours in a week.

There is still work and progress to be accomplished in Farmworkers' rights, COVID-19 was a clear reminder that farmworkers were mistreated and working in unsafe conditions. Farmworkers were considered essential workers but have often been treated poorly. According to The Michigan Farmworker Project, farmer workers were working up to 10 hours a day during these tough and unsafe times. There is no safety training most of the time for farmworks other than being told to "be careful". The Michigan Farmworker project found that in the state of Michigan there are no laws that regulate safety concerns for farm workers. This is not the only state to have minimal laws that protect farm workers. According to the Farmworker Justice Movement, many states have a minimum wage law but it can come with limitations and expectations. Farmworkers laws change from state to state. For farmworkers in many states there are no laws regarding overtime and if they can have any type of compensation.

== Environmental justice ==
Since becoming popular in the 1980s, environmental justice issues have increasingly become important in the farmworker movement. Issues typically include the use of and exposure to pesticides, food sustainability, and climate change.

=== Pesticides ===
The use of pesticides for crop protection in the agriculture industry became increasingly widespread in the 20th century, and growers (employers of farmworkers) have heavily relied on their use post-World War Two. Over 1 billion pounds of pesticides are used in the United States each year. Exposure to pesticides has been linked to negative health effects, and many farmworkers, both individuals and groups, have spoken out against their use in recent decades. As growers consistently believed that pesticides were the best method to control pests, many growers' associations worked against regulation on the use of pesticides in the 1970s. Due to the rise of globalization, employers have been pressured to lobby for less regulations against pesticides in recent years to cope with increased competition, while farmworkers have been pressured to stay silent on workplace conditions and to remain unorganized.

In more recent studies, researches have turned their focus towards the effects that pesticide exposure brings towards the youth in the Latinx farm work community. A study conducted in 2021, examined individuals who were between the age of ten and seventeen to see the aftermath pesticide leaves. During their study, the researches discovered that the exposure doesn't just occur directly in the fields, but it goes beyond. Through their analysis, they viewed how pesticide exposure was passed through clothes being contaminated, the environmental exposure, and the living situation of an individual. They even found evidence that linked individuals with pesticide exposure, even if they never stepped foot into an agricultural field, living with someone who was exposed to it was enough to contaminate someone else. The distance pesticide exposure can reach demonstrates the low protection the protection that these both young and grown farmworkers are at risk of.

Several groups of farmworkers and organizations, which represent farmworkers across the United States, have consistently spoken out against the pesticides due to their claims of negative effects on the workers who are exposed to the chemicals. Such groups include Farmworker Justice, El Comité de Apoyo a Los Trabajadores Agrícolas (CATA), and the Farmworker Advocacy Network. While other strictly environmental justice groups have achieved success in reaching their goals by lobbying for regulations and public protests, farmworkers have struggled to advance via similar methods on the issue of workplace pesticide exposure. Groups which focus on pesticides today have opted to use a variety of methods in trying to help those affected by the use of harmful chemicals. Some organizations such as CATA have used pesticide safety training, including tips on clothing to wear. Other groups, such as Farmworker Justice, have called for increased protections by the Environmental Protection Agency and the requirement of reporting pesticide use on a national level, in addition to calling for extensive research on the long-term effects of pesticide use and pesticide exposure on agricultural workers.

The chemicals found within the agricultural fields are known to have long term effects on one's health. Neurological damage, cognitive impairment, lung damages and even death are some of the negative health impacts caused by certain pesticides. According to a 2024 systematic review on pesticide exposure and long-term human health impact, they found that if someone doesn't take precautions, then the exposure can interfere with some of their brain neurotransmitters. The result of this can lead to Parkinson's disease and memory-related disorders. With the lack of safety regulations and the high usage of pesticides of the crops, both adult and young farmworkers will continue to be at risk.

The federal government has also been involved in regulating the use of and monitoring the effects of pesticides. Since its creation in 1970, The Environmental Protection Agency (EPA) has been involved in working to regulate the use of pesticides and any potential harmful effects. The EPA's Agriculture Worker Protection Standard (WPS) attempts to help workers exposed to pesticides and aims to reduce the risk involved with exposure to pesticides. The WPS gives protections to over 2 million agricultural workers and pesticide handlers; its services include preventing workers from being in areas under a restricted-entry interval (REI), with a few exceptions. On 2 November 2015, the EPA revised the WPS in order to enact stronger protections for the same workers and handlers it had covered previously. The majority of the revised protections of the WPS took effect on 2 January 2017, however three requirements will take effect on 2 January 2018; these requirements are aimed at increasing pesticide safety training and revised information posters on pesticide safety, in addition to compelling handlers to suspend applications if any workers are in an "application exclusion zone."

Recently, The Dow Chemical Company, a U.S.-based multinational chemical company, has been accused of attempting to persuade the Trump administration to ignore the findings of federal scientists that found that the chemicals chlorpyrifos, diazinon, and malathion are harmful to nearly 1,800 "critically threatened or endangered species." The chemicals are heavily used and sold by the Dow Company, and the company has hired its own scientists to create a rebuttal to the findings of the governmental studies.

=== Food justice ===
There are other specific groups that are influential in their organization attempts. For example, the Food Chain Workers Alliance is a coalition of agricultural production organizations founded in 2009 with the goal of creating a sustainable food system and advocating workers' rights while keeping the cost of food down. Campaigns include Dignity at Darden, Making Change at Walmart, and Campaign for Fair Food. The program also fights for raising the tipped minimum wage, and the Fair Food Agreement with the Coalition of Imomokalee Workers.

Another such group is the "Agricultural Justice Project" (AJP). This project seeks to promote food justice by creating a food label that signifies the certification of fair treatment of the workers who helped produce the food as well as fair contracts and pricing for farmers. The label also certifies sustainable and fair trade of the food at every step of production. Four nonprofit organizations are partners in the AJP: The Rural Advancement Foundation International (RAFI-USA), The Farmworker Support Committee (CATA), Florida Organic Growers (FOG), and the Northeastern Organic Farming Association (NOFA). Each group has the common goal of improving the quality of life for sustainable farmers.

=== Impacts of climate change ===
Heat illness risk among agricultural workers already occur among hotter climates and will increase with climate change. A 2024 report by the National Oceanic and Atmospheric Administration found that rates of global warming since 1975 have been increasing at a rate three-times faster than the long-term average rate since 1850. An analysis of heat stroke deaths among agricultural workers in the United States shows that signs of heat strain are often ignored, leading to increased risk of harm. These risks are higher for agricultural workers in the southeast and the southwest United States as these areas have higher average WBGT and are at higher risk for losing safe, workable daylight hours to climate change. A community-based study in Los Angeles County, CA found a significant increase in heat-related ED visits in communities with greater prevalence or residents working in outdoor work including agriculture, after adjusting for age, race, and poverty. Each percentage increase in residents working in agriculture resulted in a 10.9% increase in heat-related ED visits.

The fact that the majority of farmworkers are immigrants further compounds the effects of climate change on this population. 66% of agricultural workers in the U.S. are noncitizen immigrants. Studies have suggested that this has an impact on the ability of workers to advocate for their rights or protections from heat-related illness. In a study by the UC Merced Community and Labor Center, it was found that 36% of farmworkers interviewed would not be willing to file a report against their employer for workplace non-compliance. Of this group, 64% stated this was because of fear of retaliation or job loss. Furthermore, 43% of participants reported that their employer did not provide heat illness prevention plans, despite this being a mandated requirement according to California OSHA law.

== Legislation ==
In 2003, an immigration reform bill titled the Agricultural Jobs, Opportunity, Benefits and Security Act of 2003 (AgJOBS) was introduced in Congress and received bipartisan support from over 500 labor, business, immigrants rights, and other groups. The bill would allow undocumented farm workers in the US to have the opportunity to legally earn the right to stay in the country permanently by continuing to work in the agriculture industry. In April 2005 AgJobs became the first major bill aimed at immigration reform in 20 years to be supported by a majority of senators, however it was not a supermajority and did not receive enough votes to avoid a filibuster. The bill has not been passed as of April 2017.

Groups, such as Farmworker Justice, have continued to support the AgJobs bill, and while it was not a stand-alone bill in the 112th Congress, it was included with Senator Bob Menendez's (NJ) Comprehensive Immigration Reform Act of 2011.

Other recent legislation relating to farmworkers was introduced in 2011 by Representative Howard Berman (CA); the bill was titled the Agricultural Labor Market Reform Act, H.R. 3017. This bill aimed to remove incentives for growers (agricultural employers) to hire guest workers instead of US workers. This bill gathered the support of some farmworker organizations, including Farmworker Justice.

There have also been legislative attempts at enacting environmental change by farmworker groups. In 2017, a coalition including the United Farm Workers (UFW) has challenged the Environmental Protection Agency's reversal of a previous law to ban the pesticide chlorpyrifos; according to studies conducted by the EPA, exposure to chlorpyrifos, even at very low levels, can damage children's brain development and cause other brain-harming effects. The chemical was banned in 2000 for most household settings but is still used on some crops. Many environmental groups have since come out to condemn the choice of the EPA to reject the pesticide ban. The coalition has called for Administrator of the Environmental Protection Agency (EPA) Scott Pruitt to reinstate the planned ban.

In terms of legislative protections for migrant farmworkers, the U.S. Department of Labor established the "Farmworker Protection Rule" in 2024. The rule prohibits employer retaliation against workers who speak up against unfair or unsafe labor practices, such as wage theft or failure to implement heat-illness prevention programs. However, due to various federal court cases, the entire rule or sections of the rules are prevented from being implemented in different states.
