= Ag-gag =

Anti-whistleblower laws

Ag-gag laws (agricultural gag) are anti-whistleblower laws that apply within the animal agriculture industry. Popularized by Mark Bittman in an April 2011 The New York Times column (but used long before then by advocates), the term ag-gag typically refers to state laws in the United States of America that forbid undercover filming or photography of activity on farms without the consent of their owner—particularly targeting whistleblowers of suspected animal abuse at these facilities. Although these laws originated in the United States, they have also begun to appear elsewhere, such as in Australia and Canada.

Supporters of ag-gag laws have argued that they serve to protect the agriculture industry from the negative repercussions of exposés by whistle blowers. The proliferation of ag-gag laws has been criticized by various groups, arguing that the laws are intended primarily to censor animal rights abuses by the agriculture industry from the public, create a chilling effect in reporting these violations, and violate the right to freedom of speech. A number of U.S. ag-gag laws have been overturned as violations of the First Amendment to the U.S. constitution.

== Background ==
Ag-gag laws emerged in the early 1990s in response to underground activists with the Animal Liberation Front movement. In Kansas, Montana and North Dakota, state legislators made it a crime to take pictures or shoot video in an animal facility without the consent of the facility's owner.

In 2002, the conservative organization American Legislative Exchange Council (ALEC) drafted the "Animal and Ecological Terrorism Act", a model law for distribution to lobbyists and state lawmakers. The model law proposed to prohibit "entering an animal or research facility to take pictures by photograph, video camera, or other means with the intent to commit criminal activities or defame the facility or its owner". It also created a "terrorist registry" for those convicted under the law.

The whistleblower advocacy project Food Integrity Campaign (FIC), a campaign of the non-profit organization the Government Accountability Project calls undercover video of livestock facilities by whistle blowers essential:

When it comes to bringing horrific truths to the public eye, undercover footage and images are often an effective outlet for whistleblowers who otherwise risk retaliation when speaking up. Going through "proper channels" to report abuse often results in supervisors intimidating those employees who have made complaints to keep quiet. Statements by Ag Gag bill sponsors imply that "real" whistleblowers have a safe and effectual means for speaking up, when history shows that's often not the case.

Ag-gag laws have also drawn criticism on constitutional grounds by legal scholar Erwin Chemerinsky, as a violation of the First Amendment for restricting unpopular forms of speech. In August 2015, a U.S. district court ruled such a law passed by the state of Idaho to be unconstitutional as a violation of the First Amendment; Judge B. Lynn Winmill stated that "Although the State may not agree with the message certain groups seek to convey about Idaho's agricultural production facilities, such as releasing secretly recorded videos of animal abuse to the Internet and calling for boycotts, it cannot deny such groups equal protection of the laws in their exercise of their right to free speech."

== Laws ==
=== Australia ===
In Australia, several laws have been passed to strengthen existing laws for trespass, theft and vandalism—aimed at reducing animal rights vigilantism (according to livestock farmers) or gagging (according to activists).

Between 2015 and 2017, New South Wales passed several laws addressing trespass by "vegan vigilantes" at farms and slaughterhouses within bills about biosecurity. The Right to Farm Bill 2019 added criminal penalties for those who damage property, release livestock, or induce others to commit "aggravated unlawful entry".

The Australian Government passed the Criminal Code Amendment (Agricultural Protection) Act 2019 which introduced further penalties for those who publish information on the internet with the intent of inciting other "green-collared criminals" to "unlawfully damage or destroy property, or commit theft, on agricultural land". The 2019 legislation was in response to escalating animal rights activism incited through online posts and websites, leading to harassment and criminal behavior such as mass farm invasions, livestock theft and damage, often live-streamed online. In one incident a dairy farm was stormed by 100 activists and in another, cows were let loose in the road, a building was burned, and machinery damaged. In 2019, an animal rights group published a map on the internet revealing contact details and private information of farmers and slaughterhouses. A survey of pork farmers revealed 41% had experienced a raid by animal activists and 43% had had images posted online. The legislation was aimed at those "inciting others to commit unlawful trespass or other offenses in the homes and on the lands of our farmers."

=== Canada ===
==== Alberta ====
Bill 27, the Trespass Statutes (Protecting Law-Abiding Property Owners) Amendment Act, is a bill aimed at giving property owners more rights and imposes higher fines on those who trespass. The bill, which had its first reading in November 2019, makes specific reference to "land used for the production of crops, the raising and maintenance of animals, and the keeping of bees."

==== Ontario ====
The Security From Trespass and Protecting Food Safety Act, 2019 was passed on June 18, 2020. Introduced in December 2019 as Bill 156 by the Progressive Conservative Party of Ontario, it was endorsed by the Ontario Federation of Agriculture and Union des Cultivateurs Franco-Ontariens. In February 2020, a group of law professors in Canada sent a letter to the Attorney General of Ontario, expressing concern that aspects of the law would infringe on the Canadian Charter of Rights and Freedoms. Proponents of the bill cited the need for increased protections from biosecurity risks, trespass, disruption of operations, theft and harassment. The law prohibits unauthorized persons from trespassing on farm property and animal processing facilities, and prohibits protesters from interacting with livestock haulers. A person found guilty can be fined up to $15,000 for the first offence and $25,000 for subsequent offences.

The day after the bill was passed, animal rights activist Regan Russell was fatally run over by a transport truck outside a pig slaughterhouse in Burlington, where an animal rights group had been stopping trucks outside the entrance and giving water to pigs in the trailers. The incident sparked protests against the bill by animal rights groups in Canada and abroad. In March 2021, an animal rights advocacy group sued the Ontario government over the bill.

=== France ===
Déméter is a cell of the French national gendarmerie created in 2019. Its objective is to protect farmers from aggression and intrusion on farms. The system is criticized by several associations, as well as by the agricultural union Confédération paysanne. The administrative court of Paris asks the Ministry of the Interior to put an end to the prevention of "actions of an ideological nature" of the cell on 1 February 2022.

=== United States ===
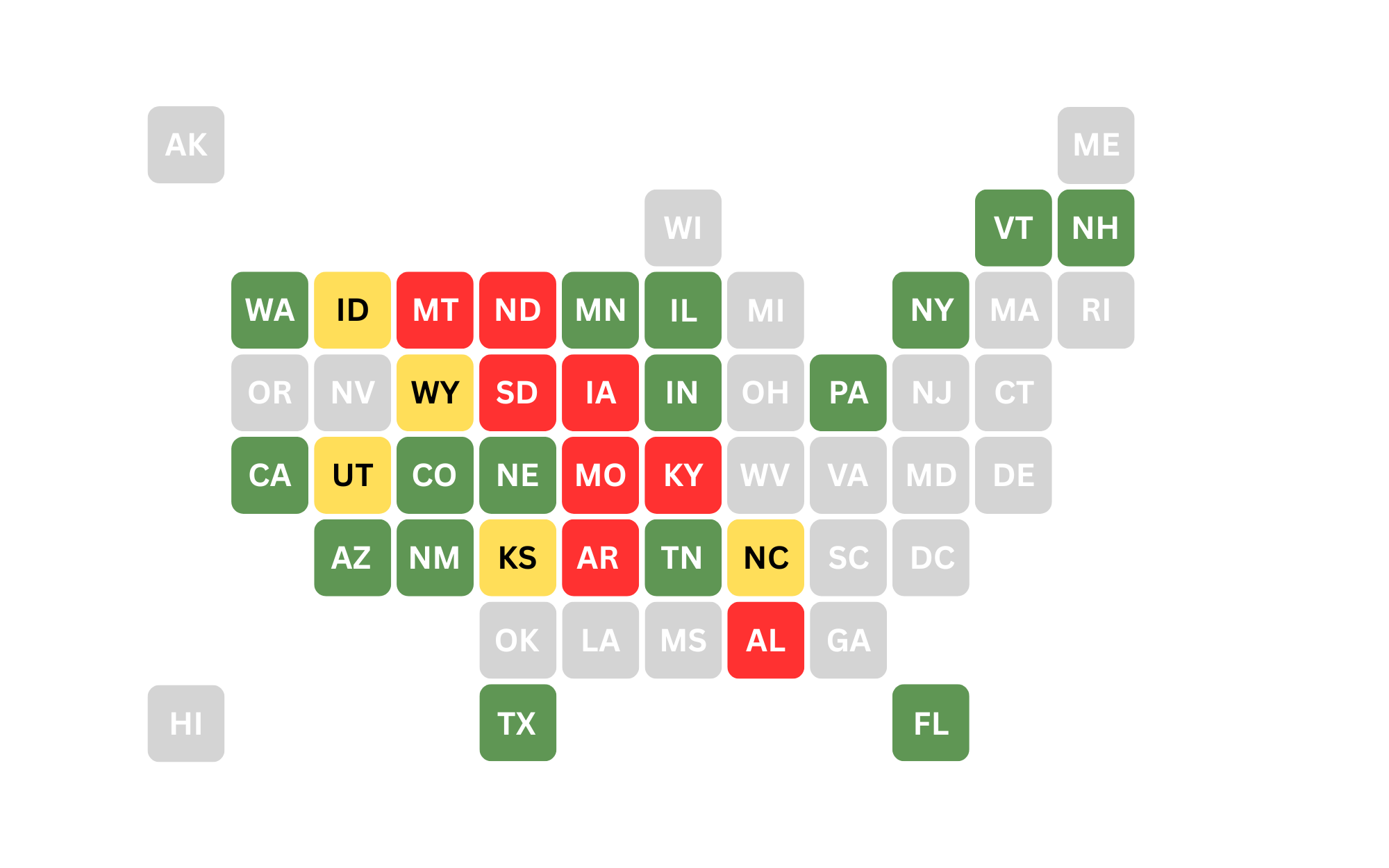
US state ag-gag legislation Statewide ag-gag law unsuccessful Statewide ag-gag ruled unconstitutional Statewide ag-gag law passed No ag-gag legislation

Several states have passed ag-gag laws, many of which have been challenged in court. A number of U.S. ag-gag laws have been overturned as violations of the First Amendment to the U.S. constitution.

==== Arkansas ====
On March 23, 2017, Arkansas Governor Asa Hutchinson signed Arkansas' ag-gag bill into law after District Judge James Moody threw out a lawsuit challenging it on grounds of constitutional violation. The constitutionality of Arkansas' ag-gag law is currently being challenged by the Animal Legal Defense Fund, Animal Equality, the Center for Biological Diversity and the Food Chain Workers Alliance, along with legal experts, scholars, and 23 media organizations who filed briefs in support. Legal professionals state that if the ruling is left standing, it "would drastically limit the ability of federal courts to protect rights guaranteed by the First Amendment."

==== Idaho ====
In February 2014, Idaho Governor Butch Otter signed Idaho's ag-gag bill, the "Agricultural Security Act", into law, which imposed fines and jail time on activists who secretly film abuse on Idaho's commercial farms. It came about as the result of the animal rights organization Mercy for Animals releasing a video of animal abuse by workers on Bettencourt Dairy farms.

On August 3, 2015, the Agricultural Security Act was struck down as unconstitutional by the U.S. District Court for the District of Idaho as a violation of the First Amendment. This decision was appealed to the Ninth Circuit, and parts of Idaho's law were struck down on First Amendment grounds in early 2018.

==== Iowa ====
In March 2012, Iowa Governor Terry Branstad signed into law the first ag-gag law in Iowa. On January 9, 2019, Iowa's ag-gag law was ruled unconstitutional by the U.S. Southern District Court of Iowa. In April 2019, another ag-gag law was signed, but on December 2, 2019, the U.S. Southern District Court of Iowa issued a preliminary injunction against enforcement of the statute. In June 2020, a third ag-gag law was signed introducing a new crime called "food operation trespass," a type of aggravated misdemeanor. In April 2021, a fourth ag-gag law, HF 775 was signed. The fourth law created "unauthorized sampling" and an additional "Cameras or electronic surveillance devices" crime applicable if someone is criminally trespassing, the penalty for which is an aggravated misdemeanor for a first offense and a class D felony for a second or subsequent-offense. On September 26, 2022, the U.S. Southern District Court of Iowa found the law to be unconstitutional.

==== Kansas ====
After being the first state to pass ag-gag legislation in 1990, Kansas struck down their ag-gag laws in 2019 on the basis they violate First Amendment rights; making them the fourth state to do so.

==== Kentucky ====
In 2024, Kentucky passed an ag-gag bill. While adding to state statutes prohibitions on the use of drones for recording audio, video and photography of "key infrastructures", the 2024 state legislature added commercial food manufacturing and processing facilities, animal feeding operations, and concentrated animal feeding operations, to the list of "key infrastructures", effectively prohibiting all photography or recordings "on or above" such operations without prior consent. The bill was vetoed by the governor, but overridden by the legislature.

==== North Carolina ====
In 2020, in the case of PETA et al. v. Stein, Judge Schroeder struck four subsections of North Carolina's 2015 Property Protection Act, writing "the law is declared unconstitutional as applied to them in their exercise of speech." The plaintiffs included People for the Ethical Treatment of Animals, Center for Food Safety, Animal Legal Defense Fund, Farm Sanctuary, Food & Water Watch, Government Accountability Project, Farm Forward, and the American Society for the Prevention of Cruelty to Animals. In February 2023, the United States Court of Appeals for the Fourth Circuit narrowed the 2020 ruling, and in October 2023 the Supreme Court rejected North Carolina's appeal.

==== Utah ====
From 2012 to 2017, Utah had an ag-gag law criminalizing entering an animal facility and filming without consent. Amy Meyer, the director of the Utah Animal Rights Coalition, along with Animal Legal Defense Fund and PETA, brought a facial challenge to the law, and in 2017 a district court judge concluded that Utah Code § 76-6-112 was unconstitutional. Meyer had been arrested in 2013 under the law, but the case was later dismissed when it was determined she was on public property at the time she was filming.

== Support ==
Proponents of the laws note that public documentation of factory farming practices will result in negative consequences for the industry. "State Sen. David Hinkins (R), who sponsored Utah's law, said it was aimed at the 'vegetarian people who are trying to kill the animal industry.'" When investigators publicize documentation of factory farms, the company generally loses business. For instance, in 2007, an undercover investigator from The Humane Society of the United States visited the Hallmark/Westland slaughterhouse in Chino, California, and filmed downed cows, too sick to stand up, being "dragged by chains and pushed by forklifts to the kill floor". A large amount of the meat from this slaughterhouse had been consumed through the National School Lunch Program, and the footage compelled "the U.S. Department of Agriculture to announce what was at the time the largest meat recall in U.S. history". Similarly, a Mercy for Animals investigation at Sparboe Farms resulted in McDonald's, Target, Sam's Club, and Supervalu all dropping Sparboe as an egg supplier. The investigation revealed cages full of dead hens rotting alongside living hens who were still laying eggs for human consumption. The investigator documented standard practices such as painful debeaking without painkillers and tossing live birds into plastic bags to suffocate, along with other behavior deemed "sadistic" and "malicious".

== Opposition ==
Fifty-nine groups, including a wide variety of welfare, civil liberties, environmental, food safety and First Amendment organizations have publicly stated opposition to ag-gag laws. Some of these groups include the American Civil Liberties Union (ACLU), Animal Legal Defense Fund (ALDF), American Society for the Prevention of Cruelty to Animals (ASPCA), Amnesty International USA, Farm Sanctuary, Food and Water Watch, Food Chain Workers Alliance, Humane Society Veterinary Medical Association, International Labor Rights Forum, National Consumers League, and United Farm Workers, among many others.

== Legal challenges ==
On July 22, 2013, the ALDF, PETA (People for the Ethical Treatment of Animals) and others filed their first lawsuit challenging ag-gag laws on constitutional grounds, in Utah. Utah's law made it illegal to obtain access to an agricultural operation under false pretenses, such as providing inaccurate information on a job application, which is one of the ways that investigative reporters document violations and abuses.

Since then, the ag-gag laws of Utah and three other states have been found unconstitutional. In August 2015, Idaho's ag-gag law was declared unconstitutional by the U.S. District Court for Idaho, and the decision was upheld on appeal. Federal district courts overturned Utah's law July 2017, and Iowa's in January 2019, and initially upheld the law in Wyoming, but overturned Wyoming's law in October 2018 following remand from the Tenth Circuit. In 2019, Kansas's long-standing ag-gag law was deemed unconstitutional after a lengthy legal battle.

Legal challenges to ag-gag laws are ongoing in other states, including Arkansas.

== See also ==
- Animal Enterprise Terrorism Act
- Animal–industrial complex
- Defense Office of Prepublication and Security Review
- Food libel laws
- Right-to-farm laws
