= National Day Laborer Organizing Network =

American labor organization

- Formation: Tax-exempt since November 2007; 18 years ago
- Type: 501(c)(3)
- Tax ID no.: EIN 208802586
- Headquarters: Pasadena, California
- Revenue: 3,928,326 USD (2024)
- Expenses: 7,665,547 USD (2024)
- Website: www.ndlon.org

The National Day Laborer Organizing Network (NDLON) is an American labor organization which aims at improving the lives of day laborers. It was founded in Northridge, California, in July 2001 and is based in Los Angeles, California. NDLON as a direct democracy where day laborers in member organizations vote directly for the policies at NDLON's biannual assemblies. NDLON started with 12 community-based organizations and has grown to over 76 member organizations.

== Origins ==
Day laborer organizing network dates back to the mid-1980s with efforts to organize and educate day laborers about their rights and civil liberties. In the late 1980s, pilot programs helped create worker centers. In the 1990s, the government became more involved in certain cities. Some supported the worker centers, while others tried to get rid of the day laborer sites. During this time organizers developed a two-step approach. The first step was a litigation strategy in the courts that challenged the solicitation ordinances. The second approach was an organizing strategy that allowed day laborers to come together to have more political inclusion and be able to represent themselves in front of governmental officials, law enforcement, and local stakeholders. In the late 1990s, organizers from the different centers were exchanging strategies and organizing practices like "libretas" which were books that were eventually distributed throughout the United States. Towards the end of the decade, more formal attempts were made to create a formal organization with the collaboration of all the worker centers. In 1999, a national coordinator was added and a national agenda was created which led to the creation of the NDLON.

== Early creation ==
On August 9, 2006, after the 2006 United States immigration reform protests, the AFL-CIO signed an agreement to work together with NDLON to improve the working conditions of immigrant day laborers. This development and the agreement were made possible because of immigrant rights activists trying to progress the rights of day laborers. Two Los Angeles community-based organizations that helped in this historic movement were the Coalition for Humane Immigrant Rights of Los Angeles (CHIRLA) and the Institute of Popular Education of Southern California (IDEPSCA). The Los Angeles day laborer organizers developed two strategies. The first strategy was to encourage participation and self-organization among the day laborers. This leadership methodology was based on Paulo Freire principles of popular education. The second strategy was to build a relationship and reduce community conflict between the day laborers and residents and merchants. This was referred to as "human relations". These efforts emerged from the advocates to protect the rights of the day laborers to seek work in public spaces as under the First Amendment. Framing their rights under the First Amendment helped solve conflicts between the day laborers and the surrounding residents. The national network was able to emerge as worker centers throughout the different states visited each other. For example, Casa Latina from Seattle and CASA of Maryland visited Los Angeles to observe job centers. These exchanges led to the first National Day Laborer Convention.

== GoFundMe campaign for family of Kilmar Abrego García ==
In April 2025, NDLON helped raised funds for the family of wrongly deported immigrant Kilmar Abrego García through a GoFundMe campaign.
