= Worker center =

Non-profit organizations in the U.S.

Worker centers are non-profit community-based mediating organizations in the United States that organize and provide support to communities of low-wage workers who are not already members of a collective bargaining organization (such as a trade union), or have been legally excluded from coverage by U.S. labor laws. Many worker centers focus on immigrant and low-wage workers in sectors such as restaurant, construction, day labor and agriculture.

== Purpose ==
Worker centers are non-profit institutions based in the community and led by their worker-members, which deliver support to low earning workers. In order to best assist in improving working conditions and wages, many centers include services such as English language instruction, help with unpaid wage claims, access to health care, leadership development, educational activities, advocacy and organization. Many centers also take the role as defender of rights for immigrants in their communities.

In the United States, worker centers have been particularly active in supporting Day laborers—predominantly immigrant men who seek short-term jobs in construction, landscaping, and related industries. Organizations like NDLON have helped establish and manage worker centers that serve as both physical hiring halls and advocacy hubs. These centers assist with wage theft claims, provide safety trainings and protect workers from harassment, raids and police surveillance. By creating formal structures for informal labor markets, worker centers aim to reduce exploitation and strengthen collective power among some of the most marginalized workers in the U.S. economy.

== Effects ==
Day Laborer Worker Centers—Worker centers support employment of day laborers in three primary ways. First, they provide a minimum wage rate. Second, they supply a distribution process for job opportunities, and third, they maintain wage standards through their support to workers victimized through wage withholding from employers.

Other Worker Centers—Worker centers that are not specific to a type of worker such as a day laborer can perform support their worker members in a wide variety of ways. Many centers offer workers rights & immigrant rights trainings. They will also address specific workplace grievances of their worker members and use the legal system, community pressure and workplace organizing to change conditions.

== Origins of worker centers ==
The first worker centers emerged in the late 1970s and early 1980s, founded by Black worker activists in North Carolina and South Carolina, immigrant activists in New York City's Chinatown, the Texas–Mexico Border in El Paso, in San Francisco among Chinese immigrants. They grew out of a response to neoliberal policies that resulted in declining working conditions in manufacturing, factory closings and an increase in low wage service sector jobs. Worker centers were also created in reaction to “disparities of pay and treatment between African American and white workers as well as exploitation within ethnic economic enclaves and in the broader economic (including informal sector) were also major catalysts”.

From the late 1980s to early 1990s, the second wave of worker centers appeared as large groups of new Latino immigrants, some fleeing civil wars in Central America, arrived in suburban and urban regions, as well as Southeast Asian immigrants, all searching for economic opportunities. These worker centers were established by numerous individuals and institutions such as "churches and other faith-based organizations, social service and legal aid agencies, immigrant nongovernmental organizations (NGOs), and unions."

The last wave of worker centers began in 2000 and continues. Many worker centers are expanding not only in the city, but into the suburbs, rural regions, and southern states where there is a large concentration of Mexican and Central American immigrants working in the poultry, service, agriculture, and meat-packing sectors. Worker centers are emerging among Korean, Filipino, South Asian and African immigrants, often with strong connections to faith-based organizations and unions.

== Features of worker centers ==
Worker centers are not governed by the National Labor Relations Act (NLRA) and do not have to have a specific organizational model, strategy or structure. They are “community-based mediating institutions that provide support to and organize among communities of low wage workers”. They use diverse strategies, tactics and approaches to serve the needs of their individual communities.

Worker centers are not considered labor organizations, and therefore are not restricted by the same laws under the National Labor Relations Act (NLRA) and Labor Management and Reporting Disclosure acts that govern traditional unions. The NLRA restricts primary picketing activity, bans any type of secondary activity, including pickets or boycotts of business connected to the primary target. Worker centers are allowed to picket businesses, can participate in secondary boycotts, and can with the News media.

Common features of worker centers include: a hybrid organization, providing necessary services, and engaging in advocacy; possess a broad agenda, approach the world with a global perspective, democracy-building, they build coalitions and have small and involved memberships. Though the vision of most worker centers is change on a systemic scale, they do meet and bargain with individual employers to improve conditions for workers. These meetings will often happen even if only a few workers in a workplace are involved. Under Section 7 of the NLRA, employees have "the right to self-organization, to form, join, or assist labor organizations, to bargain collectively through representatives of their own choosing, and to engage in other concerted activities for the purpose of collective bargaining or other mutual aid or protection."

Mutual aid or protection has been broadly interpreted to include any action (excluding criminal actions) that workers take in response to any of change in the workplace that has to do with the conditions of employment, not simply those covered by employment law. This means that even a few worker members of a worker center have the right to challenge their employers regarding working conditions and not be terminated as a result. This coverage allows great flexibility for worker centers to address everything from stolen wages and hourly pay to conditions such as high temperatures in warehouses or widespread sexual harassment in a workplace.

Despite diverse strategies, most centers do similar types of work. This includes helping workers combat wage theft through filings claims, collaborating with governmental agencies to assure enforcement of labor laws and wage theft claims, launching "direct action campaigns against specific employers and sometimes across particular industries, and engaging in leadership development and popular education." Since they define themselves as dedicated to systemic change, many worker centers also play a role as policy partners in passing laws such as a higher minimum wage, mandatory paid sick days, and domestic workers bill of rights. Their worker base mobilizes not just in actions against individual employers but in broader social movements such as immigrant rights actions.

Some centers are founded by previous union organizers, or have affiliations with unions, however, as previously stated, they are not unions. Worker centers exist to meet the demand for services that unions could or would not give. Many worker centers are established for immigrant and minority groups that work jobs where they are left out of the formal labor market and do not have the right to NLRA protection, such as day laborers, domestic workers and agricultural workers. Others have organized around groups, such as restaurant workers (Fight for 15, ROC United), that traditional unions have ignored as being too difficult to organize. In order to establish a union in a workplace, the union must get union cards from at least half the workers or have a majority vote for the union in an election. This is a great challenge in workplaces such as fast food jobs that suffer from high turnover, or in industries such as contracted cleaning companies, where even figuring out the number of employees and where they are located can be extremely difficult.

Worker Centers have played a key role in organizing and defending day laborers, many of whom are undocumented and work in unregulated, high-risk environments. These workers often gather at informal hiring sites such as street corners or parking lots, where they are vunerable to wage theft, unsafe working conditions, and immigration enforcement actions. Worker centers offer on-the ground support, including translation services, legal referrals, occupational health training, and mechanisms for recovering unpaid wages.

Worker centers serve as an essential spaces to combat immigration enforcement. Raids and police surveillance near day labor sites have led to arrests and deportations, chilling workers' willingness to speak out. In response, many centers run "know your rights" programming, legal rapid-response teams, and policy advocacy efforts aimed at limiting local law enforcement collaboration with federal immigration authorities.

During natural disasters and public health crises—such as California wildfires, Hurricane Katrina, and the COVID-19 pandemic, day laborers have performed critical cleanup and recovery work, often without personal protective equipment or access to healthcare. Worker Centers have documented these conditions and advocated for greater protections and recognition.

== Networks ==
Affiliating with sectoral worker center networks became a key growth strategy as worker centers continued to develop tools to build the low-wage worker movement; shared organizing and advocacy strategies; supported their social service, workforce, and labor market programs; and looked for ways to increase resources and opportunities for organizational development. The key national sectoral worker center networks that have developed over the past decade include the National Day Laborer Organizing Network (NDLON) in the construction, landscaping, demolition, and general laborer sectors; the Restaurant Opportunities Center(ROC), with workers in the large and diverse restaurant industry; the National Domestic Workers Alliance (NDWA), with domestic and (some) child care workers who labor mostly in residences; and the Direct Care Alliance (DCA), with workers in the home health care sector.

Additional worker center networks include:

1. National Black Worker Centers (NBWC), which connects a network of Black Worker Centers focused on issues affecting Black working people in their communities.
2. The Food Chain Workers Alliance has 17 members, 12 of which are workers centers that work with workers in the entire food system. The workers are included in the following core food industries: production, processing, distribution, retail, and service.
3 The National Employment Law Project runs a Worker Center program led by Charlotte Noss.

In August 2006, NDLON announced a new partnership with the AFL–CIO: "The AFL–CIO and NDLON will work together for state and local enforcement of rights as well as the development of new protections in areas including wage and hour laws, health and safety regulations, immigrants' rights and employee misclassification. They will also work together for comprehensive immigration reform that supports workplace rights and includes a path to citizenship and political equality for immigrant workers – and against punitive, anti-immigrant, anti-worker legislation."

Interfaith Worker Justice (IWJ) was a network which connected 34 worker centers with strong ties to religious communities. This network close din 2021.
