= Animal Legal Defense Fund =

American animal law nonprofit

- Founded: 1979; 47 years ago
- Founder: Joyce Tischler
- Type: Nonprofit organization
- Legal status: 501(c)(3)
- Purpose: Animal law
- Location: Cotati, California, United States
- Region served: North America
- Method: Legal pursuit
- Members: 100,000+
- Executive Director: Chris Green
- Key people: Joyce Tischler (Co-founder); Stephen Wells (Former Executive Director)
- Revenue: $6,760,000 (2007)
- Website: aldf.org

The Animal Legal Defense Fund is an American animal law advocacy organization. Its stated mission is to protect the lives and advance the interests of animals through the legal system. It accomplishes this by filing high-impact lawsuits to protect animals from harm, providing free legal assistance and training to prosecutors to assure that animal abusers are punished for their crimes, supporting tough animal protection legislation and fighting legislation harmful to animals, and providing resources and opportunities to law students and professionals to advance the emerging field of animal law. In addition to their national headquarters in Cotati, California, the Animal Legal Defense Fund maintains an office in Portland, Oregon.

== Programs ==
=== Litigation ===
The Animal Legal Defense Fund goes to court for animals. From filing high-impact lawsuits to providing amicus curiae briefs, its litigation work is a primary tool in the work to advance the interests of animals. The Animal Legal Defense Fund's team of expert staff attorneys may bring suit themselves, or it may retain outside counsel for representation. Its civil actions on behalf of animals often include filing amicus curiae briefs arguing the case for recognition of the bonds between humans and nonhuman animals and filing formal complaints against government agencies charged with enforcing laws meant to protect animals.

=== Criminal justice ===
The Animal Legal Defense Fund's Criminal Justice Program is staffed by attorneys, including former prosecutors, with expertise in animal protection law who provide free legal assistance to prosecutors, law enforcement, and veterinarians handling animal cruelty cases. It also works with state legislators to strengthen criminal animal protection laws.

=== Animal law ===
The Animal Legal Defense Fund's Animal Law Program works closely with law students and law professionals to advance the emerging field of animal law. Moving toward the day when animal law is part of the curriculum at each and every law school, the Animal Law Program collaborates with students, faculty, and school administrations to facilitate the development of animal law courses and assists students in forming Animal Legal Defense Fund Student Chapters.

=== Pro bono ===
Working to expand the practice and understanding of animal law in the legal community, the Animal Legal Defense Fund partners with attorneys and pro bono coordinators across the country. The program utilizes these volunteers to support the Animal Legal Defense Fund's litigation, criminal justice, and legislative goals. The Animal Legal Defense Fund also works to expand the practice and understanding of animal law in the legal community by delivering presentations at law firms and state bar association events and keeping volunteers updated on the latest cases, animal law conferences, and continuing legal education opportunities.

=== Legislation ===
The Animal Legal Defense Fund works at the state and local levels to advance important legislation. The Legislative Affairs Program advocates for laws that promote or protect the lives and interests of animals and opposes legislation that would be detrimental to animals’ well-being.

== U.S. Animal Protection Laws State Rankings ==
The Animal Legal Defense Fund's annual report comprehensively surveys animal protection laws of all U.S. states and territories. It is the longest-running and most authoritative report of its kind, assessing the strength of each jurisdiction's animal protection laws by examining over 4,000 pages of statutes. The report also highlights the top, middle and bottom tiers of jurisdictions and notes the "Best Five" and "Worst Five" states overall.

== Cases and campaigns ==
=== 2018 ===
In December, the Supreme Court denied the foie gras industry's petition challenging California's ban on the sale of foie gras. The Ninth Circuit Court of Appeals' mandate went into immediate effect, banning foie gras in California. The Animal Legal Defense Fund filed numerous amicus briefs in the six-plus years of litigation, urging courts to uphold the law.

In October, the Animal Legal Defense Fund and the National Council of Juvenile and Family Court Judges (NCJFCJ) announced a first-of-its-kind partnership to address judicial response in court cases related to animal cruelty.

In March 2018, a consumer protection lawsuit was filed by the Animal Legal Defense Fund against Trader Joe's on behalf of an egg purchaser. The lawsuit sought to stop Trader Joe's from deceptively and misleadingly labeling its cage-free eggs. The consumer argued that Trader Joe's was violating multiple California consumer protection laws by selling cage-free eggs in cartons with representations of hens foraging in pastures, when the eggs were actually from industrial hen houses, where hens do not have access to the outdoors. The case reached a settlement in June 2018, in which Trader Joe's agreed to pull the packaging not only in California but nationwide.

In the spring of 2018, after the Animal Legal Defense Fund announced its intent to sue Deer Haven Mini Zoo in Keymar, Maryland for violations of the federal Endangered Species Act and state cruelty laws, the owners agreed to voluntarily relinquish some of the animals on the property. Two endangered lemurs, a bobcat, six arctic foxes, four cavies, and a coatimundi were removed from the unaccredited roadside menagerie and transferred to sanctuaries.

=== 2017 ===
In August, a California judge ordered Manning Beef, a slaughterhouse, to pay $94,500 in attorneys' fees after Manning falsely accused Los Angeles Cow Save, a group that organized vigils for animals killed at the slaughterhouse, of trespassing. The fees were awarded after the Animal Legal Defense Fund, the Law Offices of Matthew Strugar, and attorney Ryan Gordon filed an anti-SLAPP motion on behalf of the group.

In July, the U.S. District Court of Utah ruled the Utah ag-gag statute was unconstitutional, the second decision against an ag-gag statute affirming it was unconstitutional. Both rulings were due to lawsuits filed by the Animal Legal Defense Fund. Ag-gag laws criminalize undercover investigations at factory farms and slaughterhouses that often expose serious animal cruelty and violations of environmental and safety laws.

In February, the inhumane King Kong Zoological Park in North Carolina shut down permanently after the Animal Legal Defense Fund filed a lawsuit alleging the zoo's treatment of animals violated North Carolina's animal cruelty laws. North Carolina's unique civil animal cruelty law empowers concerned members of the public to report when criminal animal cruelty laws go ignored and under-enforced, as they did at the King Kong Zoo.

=== 2016 ===
In September, the Animal Legal Defense Fund won a lawsuit against the Pennsylvania Deptartment of Agriculture for dogs suffering in puppy mills. The department was forced to reinstate comprehensive regulations for commercial dog breeders. The rules had prohibited some of the cruelest and most inhumane practices, such as keeping mother dogs in cages with metal wirestrand flooring and never letting mother dogs outside for exercise.

In August, the Animaland Zoological Park in Pennsylvania permanently shut down in response to a March 2016 lawsuit filed by the Animal Legal Defense Fund. The lawsuit alleged that the zoo violated the Endangered Species Act and state wildlife laws by failing to provide adequate care for animals confined at the facility. Two bears and an endangered wolf were relocated to sanctuaries that are capable of meeting their needs.

In February, the Animal Legal Defense Fund won an Endangered Species Act lawsuit on behalf of four tigers and three lemurs held in substandard captivity at Cricket Hollow Zoo, a roadside zoo in Iowa. This victory is the first time that animal advocates successfully used the Endangered Species Act to obtain a court order for the removal of captive animals from substandard conditions, and sets important precedent that isolation of social animals violates the Act.

=== 2015 ===
In October, the California Coastal Commission voted at the Animal Legal Defense Fund's request that SeaWorld San Diego must discontinue its captive orca breeding program in order to proceed with its Blue World expansion plans at that facility.

In February, the Animal Legal Defense Fund settled its public nuisance lawsuit against Jim Mack's Ice Cream to secure the release of a female black bear named Ricki from her 16-year confinement at the ice cream shop to the Colorado-based Wild Animal Sanctuary.

In August, the U.S. District Court for the District of Idaho ruled that the state's ag-gag law, Idaho Code sec. 18-7042, violates the First and Fourteenth Amendments to the U.S. Constitution, the first time a court had declared an ag-gag statute unconstitutional and a landmark victory for a broad-based public interest coalition of national nonprofits, including the Animal Legal Defense Fund, PETA, the ACLU of Idaho, and the Center for Food Safety.

=== 2014 ===
In May, following a petition by the Animal Legal Defense Fund, PETA, Orca Network, and others, the National Marine Fisheries Service proposed a rule to grant Lolita the same status under the Endangered Species Act (ESA) that covers all other Southern Resident orcas, the pod that she was seized from in 1970. The Animal Legal Defense Fund and PETA believe that the current confinement conditions are prohibited by the ESA. This may lead to Lolita being retired from performing and transferred to a seaside sanctuary.

In January 2014, Caltrans agreed to remove bird-killing nets at a local highway project, and vowed to use safer construction methods, after settling with the Animal Legal Defense Fund and conservation groups.

=== 2013 ===
In July 2013, the Animal Legal Defense Fund filed the first lawsuit in the nation to challenge the constitutionality of an ag-gag law. Utah's law, which criminalizes the videotaping on factory farms, attacks activity protected under the U.S. Constitution's First and Fourteenth Amendments.

Also in July 2013, eleven bears were removed from gladiator-style bear pits at a North Carolina roadside zoo after the Animal Legal Defense Fund sent the Chief Saunooke Bear Park a letter threatening to sue for ongoing harm to the grizzlies.

As a result of the false advertising lawsuit against New York-based Hudson Valley Foie Gras, the company agreed to stop advertising its products as "humane."

=== 2012 ===
In March, the Clay County (Kentucky) Circuit Court entered an agreed order of judgment resolving the Animal Legal Defense Fund's lawsuit against the county to stop systematic abuses at the local animal shelter.

In June, the Animal Legal Defense Fund finalized a settlement and court order resolving a lawsuit alleging widespread egregious animal abuse and neglect at Cal-Cruz Hatcheries, Inc., a Santa Cruz, Calif. hatchery that processed millions of birds each year destined for the chicken and duck meat industries. Following the lawsuit, which was based on an undercover video, Cal-Cruz is no longer in operation, and the former owner may no longer work with animals.

In August, a North Carolina judge granted Ben the Bear permanent sanctuary at the Performing Animal Welfare Society as a result of a lawsuit against Jambbas Ranch—Animal Legal Defense Fund attorneys worked to represent the plaintiffs. Ben had languished for years on cement in a chain-link kennel—he now has the chance to live like a bear should, with plenty of space to roam, play, and forage in his new habitat.

=== 2011 ===
In February, Guam voted to dramatically strengthen the territory's laws protecting animals. Guam's new legislation adopts robust minimum care standards and other definitions which mirror much of what is contained in the Animal Legal Defense Fund's model animal protection laws.

In November, the Animal Legal Defense Fund won its lawsuit to free Tony the Tiger from the Tiger Truck Stop in Grosse Tete, Louisiana. The judge ordered the Louisiana Department of Wildlife and Fisheries to revoke the current permit and prohibited it from issuing any new permits to the Truck Stop.

=== 2010 ===
After more than 100 live and approximately 150 dead Chihuahuas and Chihuahua-mixes were removed from Kenneth Lang Jr's home in 2009, the Animal Legal Defense Fund provided a grant of $3,500 to allow the Dearborn Police Department to conduct necropsies on 10 of the Chihuahuas whose bodies were removed from freezers on 56-year-old Lang's property. Kenneth Lang Jr. pleaded guilty to animal cruelty in January 2010.

=== 2009 ===
The Animal Legal Defense Fund secured permanent custody of seven horses rescued from Michael, Judy, and Gayle Keating, the abusive North Carolina owners who allowed them to starve nearly to death, in the case of ALDF v. Keating.

On October 6, the United States Supreme Court directly addressed the issue of animal cruelty for the first time in more than fifteen years. The Animal Legal Defense Fund submitted an amicus curiae brief in the case of U.S. v. Stevens, urging the Court to uphold the law and recognize that the prevention of cruelty to animals is a compelling government interest.

=== 2008 ===
In August, the Animal Legal Defense Fund filed lawsuits in Kentucky against Estill and Robertson Counties for neglecting their homeless animals, despite their legal requirement to provide basic humane care.

The Animal Legal Defense Fund called on Kentucky's legislature to push for comprehensive changes in its laws protecting horses and other animals. In 2008, Kentucky ranked last in the nation for animal protection laws.

== See also ==
- List of animal rights groups
