= Defense Office of Prepublication and Security Review =

United States Armed Forces department

The Defense Office of Prepublication and Security Review (DOPSR) is a department of the United States Armed Forces with the Pentagon, under Washington Headquarters Services, that supports the review and authorized release of government materials from members and veterans of the military and the United States Intelligence Community, including reviews of classified and restricted information.

== History ==
The origins of the Defense Office of Prepublication and Security Review trace back to the late 1940s. In March 1949, a Security Review Branch was established within the newly created Office of the Secretary of Defense (OSD) as the Department's first operational security review function. By April 1949 this function was consolidated as the first operational activity in OSD. The restrictive and review functions of DOPSR trace back to the Central Intelligence Agency in the 1950s during the Cold War, and limits placed on some intelligence officials. The United States Supreme Court has only considered DOPSR and the pre-publication system once, in Snepp v. United States, involving journalist and former CIA official Frank Snepp.

== Role and mission ==
DOPSR manages the Department's security and prepublication review program, reviewing written materials prior to public release to ensure no information damaging to national security is disclosed. The legality of the DOPSR program is based upon non-disclosure agreements signed by government officials who are given access to classified information.

== See also ==
- Ag-gag
- Born secret
- Invention Secrecy Act
- Military Whistleblower Protection Act
- Public interest defence
- Whistleblower protection in the United States
- Witness protection
