= Invention Secrecy Act =

US law restricting disclosure of certain patents for national security reasons

Invention Secrecy Act of 1951

United States Congress
- Long title: An Act to provide for the withholding of certain patents that might be detrimental to the national security, and for other purposes
- Citation: 66 Stat. 3
- Enacted by: 82nd United States Congress
- Enacted: February 1, 1952
- Signed by: Harry S. Truman
- Bill citation: Pub. L. 82–256, 66 Stat. 3, enacted February 1, 1952

The Invention Secrecy Act of 1951 (Pub. L. 82–256, 66 Stat. 3, enacted February 1, 1952, codified at 35 U.S.C. ch. 17) is a United States federal law that authorizes the government to suppress disclosure of certain inventions for reasons of national security. It first became law as an executive order in 1947, promulgated by the administration of President Harry S. Truman. Full congressional enactment followed in 1951. The exigencies of the Cold War drove its creation and it passed the U.S. Congress relatively quickly once introduced.

The statute empowers selected federal agencies to decide whether a patent application poses a risk and to compel its classification under secrecy orders. In practice, secrecy orders have been imposed not only on inventions affecting military defense but also on those alleged to threaten economic stability, with critics noting that many such restrictions rest on speculative or unproven harms. The law applies broadly to all inventions in the United States for which a patent is filed or granted (35 U.S.C. § 181). Every patent application is reviewed, and thousands of inventions are manually screened each year. Any federal agency with "classifying powers" can order a restriction under the Act.

Critics, including attorneys and academics, describe the system as lacking oversight and limiting avenues of appeal. Commentators have likened secrecy orders to uncompensated takings under the Fifth Amendment to the United States Constitution, and legal scholars argue that the regime is "inherently unfair" because inventors are automatically denied a quarter of their patent's assessed value while being unable to prove harm. Historians note that officials manage secrecy orders to avoid judicial precedents on the Act's constitutionality.

Other critics contend that secrecy orders chill research, stall economic development, and entrench the military–industrial complex by sidelining independent inventors and dual-use technologies. The statutory rationale in 35 U.S.C. § 181 is that secrecy orders are needed when disclosure "might be detrimental to the national security." Most scholarly commentary has been critical of the regime, though one law review article has argued limited secrecy may be justified in biotechnology patents.

== World War I and II background ==
Invention secrecy in the United States can be traced to at least the 1910s, and it accelerated during the 1940s alongside the classified development of nuclear weapons. The precursor to the Invention Secrecy Act was the Espionage Act of 1917. It authorized the Commissioner of Patents to withhold patents during wartime if disclosure might aid the enemy or endanger public safety. Contemporary reports stressed that secrecy orders had to balance national defense with the protection of inventors' rights. The final version of the 1917 World War I–era statute directed the Commissioner of Patents to restrict inventions when:

...detrimental to the public safety or defense, or may assist the enemy or endanger the successful prosecution of the war, [the Commissioner of Patents] may order that the invention be kept secret and withhold the grant of a patent until the end of the war.

In 1940, the United States Patent and Trademark Office (USPTO) and the military created the Army and Navy Patent Advisory Board, later renamed the Armed Services Patent Advisory Board, to advise on secrecy determinations. Secrecy orders were intended to last two years beginning July 1, 1940, yet they remained in force for the rest of the war. Through World War II alone, at least 11,000 inventions were submitted for classification review, and other research found that about 8,475 inventions were actually placed under secrecy—roughly 75 percent of all new inventions reviewed during that period, when more than 20,000 total patents were screened.

The Commissioner lifted most secrecy orders in 1945, rescinding more than 6,500 patents, though several hundred remained in place on national security grounds. After 1945, the USPTO rescinded 6,575 wartime secrecy orders, but by 1951 the number of active orders had climbed back to nearly 2,400, reflecting Cold War concerns. By 1951, the backlog of secrecy orders had grown to nearly 2,400 pending applications.

== Invention Secrecy Act of 1951 ==
The Invention Secrecy Act (ISA) of 1951 made such patent secrecy permanent, though the order to suppress any invention must be renewed each year, except during periods of declared war or national emergency. The 1951 Act allowed secrecy orders to be renewed annually in peacetime, creating semi-permanent restrictions so long as agencies affirmed a national security need. During wartime or declared national emergencies, secrecy orders were extended automatically until hostilities or emergencies formally ended, plus six months beyond. This gave agencies broad discretion to keep patents restricted. Under 35 U.S.C. § 181, secrecy orders are applied when "publication or disclosure of an invention ... might be detrimental to the national security." When the ISA was passed in 1951, the USPTO did not publish pending applications, so the statute did not originally address withholding publication.

The ISA authorized the Commissioner of Patents to flag applications, including those submitted by private inventors, for review by defense agencies and possible restriction. If government officials determine that an idea or invention could pose a threat, it can be restricted from public disclosure under a secrecy order. Any federal government agency, not just those associated with the United States Armed Forces and United States Intelligence Community, may request that any patent be restricted under the ISA if the agency has classification authority.

Under a secrecy order, a patent may be withheld from export, limited in access to defense agencies, or placed under classification. By law, the government is only required to compensate the inventor of a restricted idea for 75 percent of its assessed value, as determined by the restricting agency, and the inventor must demonstrate damages. Congress later revised compensation rules to allow inventors to seek damages caused by secrecy orders without first tendering the invention to the government.

However, inventors find it difficult, if not impossible, to prove they suffered harm under the ISA because they cannot disclose the invention. The 1951 statute also granted inventors limited appeal rights to the Secretary of Commerce and reduced earlier restrictions on foreign filings. If an inventor attempts to file the invention abroad without authorization, it can be deemed legally "abandoned". In Halpern v. United States (1958), the United States Court of Appeals for the Second Circuit rejected the government's position that suits under the ISA could not proceed unless a secrecy order was rescinded, noting that such cases could be tried in camera. Earlier, in Robinson v. United States (1956), the court rejected the argument that a complete administrative denial barred a suit.

In one example, a patent application filed in 1936 remained secret until 2000, when it was finally issued for a cryptograph to manually encode and decode messages, a technology long obsolete by that point. Congress never explicitly justified peacetime secrecy when it passed the 1951 Act, instead relying on Harry Truman's 1950 emergency declaration; hearings in 1980 later noted that peacetime orders lacked a formal legislative rationale. Congress did not provide a rationale for peacetime secrecy, relying on Truman's 1950 emergency proclamation, which extended secrecy orders six months beyond its duration. The Act's peacetime provisions did not truly operate until 1979, because Truman's 1950 emergency declaration kept secrecy orders in force for nearly three decades.

As of 1997, it was reported that five to ten percent of all patents that the American military reviews under the ISA become subject to secrecy orders. In the four-year window of 2013 to 2017, an average of 117 new inventions per year were restricted with secrecy orders. In the same 2013–2017 period, an average of 25 secrecy orders were reportedly rescinded per year. In 2015, the USPTO issued 95 new secrecy orders, about one for every 6,600 patent applications, most tied to inventions created for the military or other federal agencies. In 2017, the Federation of American Scientists reported USPTO statistics that 5,784 patents were restricted under secrecy orders. A total of 5,792 unique patents were under secrecy orders as of 2018. Approximately twelve inventions by private, non-government-affiliated inventors per year are historically classified and made unavailable to develop for the individuals involved.

Through 2012–2020, the United States Patent Office investigated expanding application of the ISA to consider economic impacts on American markets from new inventions, particularly those that might disrupt existing industries. Attempts through 2020 to expand the scope of the ISA in Congress were unsuccessful, attributed to lobbying from groups such as the American Bar Association.

=== Invention Secrecy Act screening process ===
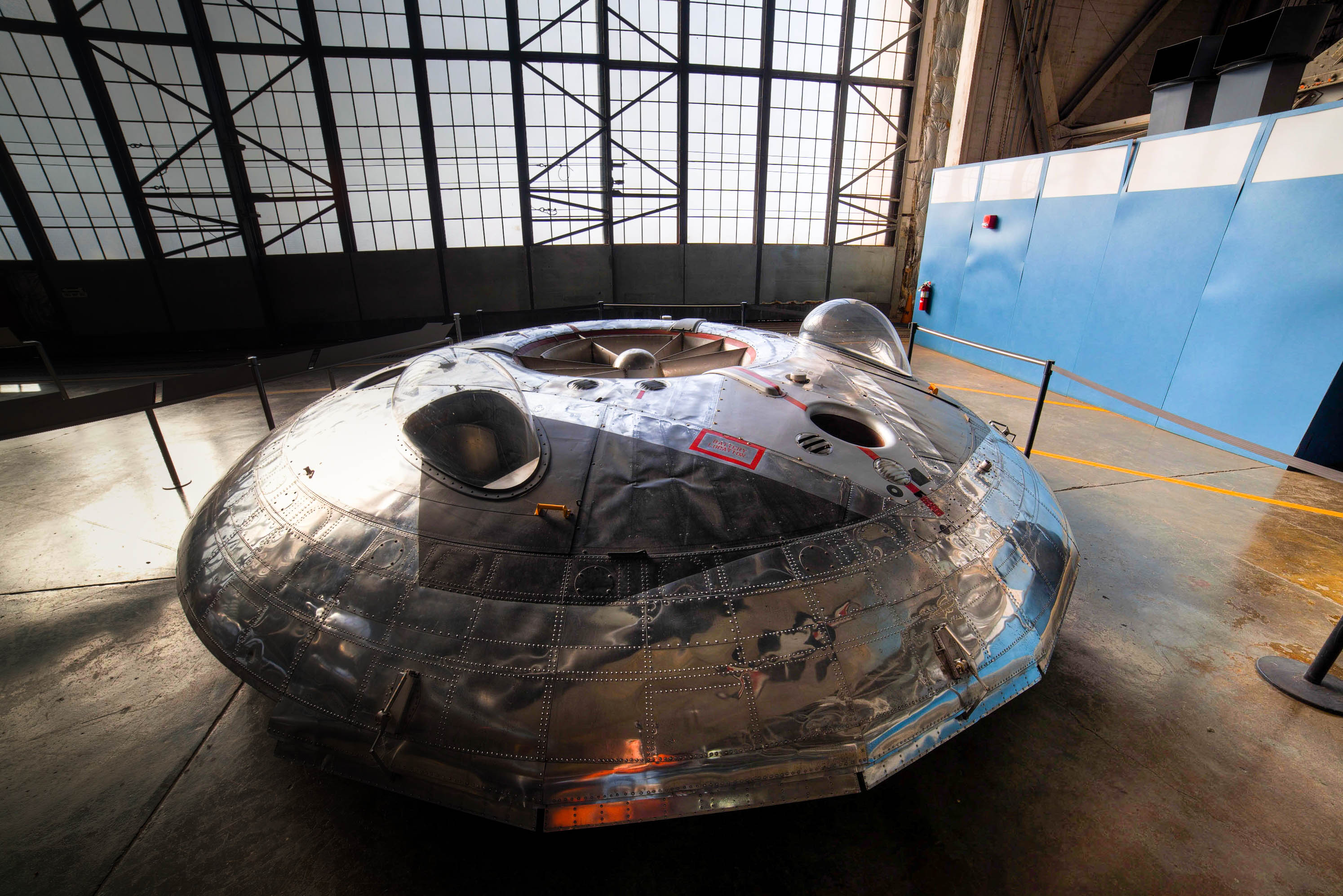
The Avrocar at Wright-Patterson Air Force Base. Under the ISA, Air Force Materiel Command determined which inventions were restricted on behalf of the United States Air Force.

Under this Act, defense agencies provide the Patent Office with a classified list of sensitive technologies in the form of the "Patent Security Category Review List" (PSCRL). The decision to classify new inventions is made by "defense agencies" as defined by the President. These agencies include the Pentagon, the National Security Agency (NSA), the United States Department of Justice, and the United States Department of Homeland Security. The law applies to all inventions created in the United States, regardless of their nature or nationality of the creators, though the "vast majority" of inventions have no legal or financial stake from the government. The ISA applies only to inventions created in the United States; inventions made abroad fall outside its scope. All patents filed within the country are required to be screened for the ISA.

Each year, tens of thousands of new inventions and patent applications were manually reviewed to determine whether they should be hidden from the public. When the government had no property interest in an invention, the United States Patent and Trademark Office (USPTO) played a larger role in secrecy decisions. Orders were determined through a two-stage process, first at the Patent Office and then at a defense agency.

USPTO's Group 220 conducted secrecy review of all applications and forwarded flagged ones to defense agencies for opinion. USPTO examiners relied on the Armed Services Patent Advisory Board's Patent Security Category Review List, which contained 21 invention categories of security interest to agencies such as the United States Army, Navy, Air Force, the United States Atomic Energy Commission (AEC), NASA, and the NSA. Roughly three percent of all patent applications fell into these areas.

If agencies determined that disclosure would harm national security, they notified the Commissioner, who was required to order secrecy. Of the thousands reviewed by defense agencies, five to ten percent were subjected to secrecy orders. Agency heads (or delegates) needed only to determine detriment to national security; upon notice, the Commissioner had to order secrecy and withhold publication and grant of the patent. The Commissioner of Patents was legally compelled to comply.

Inventions that received any government funding toward their research and development were reviewed, beyond any military departments or intelligence agencies, by the segment of the United States government that had a funding and research stake in them. If a federal agency had a property interest in an invention, it was required to notify the USPTO that a secrecy order was needed. The vast majority of patent applications, ideas, and inventions had no government affiliation. For those submitted by the general public, the Commissioner for Patents of the United States Patent and Trademark Office made the initial decision on whether the idea would endanger national security. Different agencies of the U.S. government with authority to classify inventions under the ISA maintained offices to manage this responsibility; for example, Air Force Materiel Command at Wright-Patterson Air Force Base determined what ideas became secret under the ISA on behalf of the United States Air Force.

Once the application and screening process begins, there are three possible outcomes. The first outcome is that the patent and an associated foreign patent filing license may be granted, and the ISA would not bind or restrict the invention. The second outcome is that the government may take no action, allowing the creators to pursue the invention fully in United States and foreign markets. In either of these first two scenarios, the government has a six-month window from the patent filing to act. For design patents, the foreign filing deadline is six months, while for utility patents it is twelve months; this distinction shapes the government's review window.

The third outcome is that a secrecy order is imposed on the invention. The creators are then forbidden from sharing, disclosing, discussing, developing, selling, or marketing the invention within the United States or in foreign nations. Secrecy orders can indefinitely block issuance of a patent; even if an invention is found patentable, no patent will be granted until the order is rescinded. Appeals and interferences are likewise suspended.

=== Types of Secrecy Orders ===
Timeline of United States utility patents issued by year.

There are three known types of secrecy orders that can be enforced, referred to as Types I, II, and III. Violation of a United States government secrecy order may lead to arrest and imprisonment. Willful violation can bring up to a $10,000 fine and two years' imprisonment, with possible additional penalties under 18 U.S.C. § 798 when classified. Disclosure of inventions or ideas restricted by a secrecy order can result in up to two years' imprisonment in federal prison.

The secrecy order notices command inventors that:

"the subject matter or any material information relevant to this application, including unpublished details of the invention, shall not be published or disclosed to any person not aware of the invention prior to the date of this order, including any employee of the principals."

The three known types of secrecy orders are:

1. Type I secrecy orders, referred to as "Secrecy Order and Permit for Foreign Filing in Certain Countries," are typically used to restrict ideas or materials derived from government funding that may not themselves be secret or classified before receiving an order under the ISA, but are already subject to restrictions under the Export Administration Regulations or International Traffic in Arms Regulations.
2. Type II secrecy orders, also known as "Secrecy Order and Permit for Disclosing Classified Information," apply to ideas and inventions that are already partly composed of classified concepts and technologies, or that are submitted for patent review by Americans who hold existing United States Department of Defense security agreements. Types I and II therefore typically apply to ideas and concepts already within the United States government domain.
3. Type III secrecy orders, called a "General Secrecy Order", are used as a catch-all to restrict ideas, technologies, or inventions not covered by Type I or II secrecy orders. Type III secrecy orders are generally applied to inventions by the general public.

All "security review" files related to "the security review of patent applications, placing of applications under secrecy, modification of secrecy orders, and withdrawing of applications from secrecy" are required to be destroyed ten years after a secrecy order is rescinded.

== Known public examples of restricted technologies ==
Notable examples include inventors who publicly resisted secrecy orders. In 1958, the Associated Press reported on Vienna-born physicist Otto Halpern, who was forced into a private, classified courtroom trial based upon national security claims by the U.S. Navy. Halpern's invention was related to a new method to evade radar-type detection. In 1978, the National Security Agency restricted an invention called the "Phasorphone", which allowed people to digitally alter and obfuscate their voices on telephone calls for privacy from government surveillance. The Phasorphone inventors took their opposition to the media, and months later the NSA rescinded the order.

James Constant of California was restricted by a secrecy order from 1969 to 1971 for his advancements in radar systems to track objects ranging from shipping containers to parts on an industrial assembly line, and in 1982 was denied damages by the courts. James Greer of Alabama was bound by a secrecy order from 2000 to 2008 for an invention that could have enabled development of "anti-stealth" tracking systems. In 2002, inventor Robert Gold had his idea for improvements in wireless communications restricted by a secrecy order.

Husband and wife inventors Budimir and Desanka Damnjanovic developed a method for "spraying liquid from the back of an airplane," intended as a patent for an anti-heat-seeking missile technology system. In 2009, their concept was classified under secrecy orders, and the Damnjanovics began the appeals process under the ISA. The Federal Bureau of Investigation visited their home to warn them against any disclosures of the technologies, according to their attorney Hattem Beydoun and court filings. Their path through the appeals process under the ISA took five years but did not resolve the restrictions. In 2014, the Damnjanovics filed a lawsuit against the Air Force and the Department of Defense after their patent for an anti–heat-seeking-missile measure was classified under two secrecy orders. They claimed violations of the First and Fifth Amendment to the United States Constitution. The government ultimately settled and lifted the secrecy orders before the case went to trial and legal precedent could be established. The government paid the Damnjanovics $63,000, described as a "rare case" by Alex Wellerstein in Bloomberg News of private inventors being compensated for a secret patent application; the years-long process "almost never pays out".

== Criticism and concerns ==
Derivative classification activity 1996–2011

Secrecy orders can bar public disclosure entirely, prohibit sales to anyone outside the defense sector, block exports, and seal restricted applications as classified. The United States Patent and Trademark Office has also considered expanding secrecy orders beyond traditional national security concerns to inventions considered important to U.S. economic security. Inventors whose work is restricted may petition for compensation, but scholars note that courts have often denied claims on the ground that inventors cannot show "actual damages" while their inventions remain suppressed.

=== Handling and evaluation of ideas and patents ===
Critics argue that the ISA lacks published standards for deciding which inventions may be placed under secrecy orders and provides no clear safeguards for privacy or intellectual property rights. The only limitation on restriction is the discretion of agencies; how they make that determination is entirely up to them. Writing in Slate, Arvind Dilawar said of the ISA, "At best, government agencies err on the side of caution and impose secrecy orders on patents that present even the slightest threats to national security. At worst, bureaucrats mindlessly impose secrecy orders and then forget about them, because that's simpler than carefully considering the implications of new technologies becoming public." Dilawar added that the secrecy system leaves potentially valuable inventions withheld from public view, with inventors' only recourse being to petition the government to reconsider. Between 1983 and 1993, the number of secrecy orders rose by about forty percent (from 3,900 to 6,033), a level comparable to the wartime peak in World War II.

Historian Alex Wellerstein has said that "the government's legal basis for keeping private information secret is very vulnerable," adding that officials manage secrecy orders to avoid federal courts "creating precedent around the core constitutional issue." Commentators have also compared secrecy orders to Fifth Amendment takings, arguing that the Act deprives inventors of property rights without providing the constitutional level of due process or compensation required in other contexts. Legal scholars have argued that the system is inherently unfair because, unlike takings under eminent domain where just compensation must equal full value, the ISA authorizes the government to automatically withhold twenty-five percent from inventors. Thomas G. Dignan Jr., writing in the Michigan Law Review, argued that inventors who disclose ideas to the government "effectively lose almost all avenues of appeal" once a secrecy order is imposed. Court decisions applying the Act have repeatedly denied compensation to inventors because they could not establish "actual damages", even when secrecy orders clearly restricted them.

By the early 1990s, secrecy orders increasingly targeted private inventors of dual-use technologies. In 1991, more than three-quarters of new secrecy orders—506 out of 774—were issued to private inventors, covering fields such as lasers, ceramics, semiconductors, software, and space photography.

=== Impacts on economics and creation of inventions ===
Multiple studies conclude that the ISA reduces the overall number of new inventions disclosed, because scientific and technical progress typically builds on openly published prior work. One analysis found that keeping an invention secret for only a few months makes it about 15 percent less likely to be cited in later research and development, showing that even short-term restrictions can inhibit follow-on innovation. Inventions held under secrecy orders for five years receive, on average, 45 percent fewer citations, and they do not regain that lost impact once the orders are lifted.

Eric B. Chen of the University of Texas School of Law reported that between 2000 and 2004 only 53 percent of USPTO patents were issued to U.S. residents. Because the Act imposes stricter foreign-filing controls on American applicants, U.S. inventors face greater burdens than nonresident inventors. No comprehensive data exist on the broader economic effects of such "compulsory secrecy", although James W. Parrett Jr. of William & Mary Law School has argued that limited secrecy can be justified for emerging areas such as biotechnology patents, where disclosure risks remain poorly understood. Changes in presidential administrations create instability in what technologies are made secret, adding uncertainty for inventors.

== Declassified Category Review Lists ==
The Federation of American Scientists and Steven Aftergood obtained Category Review Lists through Freedom of Information Act requests after they were declassified, detailing categories of inventions and concepts that the United States government may classify under the ISA. A declassified document from January 1971, Patent Security Category Review List, lists the invention categories that the United States Patent Office referred to the Armed Services Patent Advisory Board for possible classification. A similar document, DoD Patent Security Review List, May 2009, gives the categories in 2009. The high-level categories from each year that could be classified are compared below.

Comparison of declassified category review lists, 1971 and 2009
1971 Patent Security Category Review List	2009 DoD Patent Security Review List
Amplifiers, recorders, sensors and electronic tubes	Amplifiers, recorders, sensors, & electronic tubes
Computers	Computers
Concealment, communications, countermeasures & counter-countermeasures	Concealment, communications, countermeasures & counter-countermeasures
Contracts	Contracts
Explosives & inflammables	Explosives & inflammables
Explosive actuating methods & means: fuzes, ignition, mine sweeping & torpedoes	Explosive actuating methods & means: fuses, igniters, mine sweeping & torpedoes
Explosive device detection methods & means	Explosive device detection methods & means
Mapping, charting & geodesy	Mapping, charting & geodesy
Materials	Materials
Meteorology	Meteorology
Military photography	Military photography
Miscellaneous	Miscellaneous
Missiles, munitions and explosive devices	Missiles, munitions and explosive devices
Navigation equipment	Navigation equipment
Object locating methods & means	Object locating methods & means
Power supply	Power supply
Propulsion systems, propellants, & fuels	Propulsion systems, propellants, & fuels
Protective measures	Protective measures
Radiology	Radiology
Unique materials, devices, or performance data and characteristics	Unique materials, devices, or performance data & characteristics
Vehicles	Vehicles
Weapons, counter-weapons & fire control	Weapons, counter-weapons & fire control

== See also ==
- Atomic Energy Act of 1946
- Atomic Energy Act of 1954
- Backlog of unexamined patent applications
- Born secret
- Classified information in the United States
- Defense Office of Prepublication and Security Review
- Export of cryptography from the United States
- Free energy suppression conspiracy theory
- History of United States patent law
- International Traffic in Arms Regulations
- United States patent law
