= Military Whistleblower Protection Act =

Military Whistleblower Protection Act of 1988 (MWPA), as amended at title 10, United States Code, Section 1034, and elsewhere, is an American law providing protection of lawful disclosures of illegal activity by members of the United States Armed Forces.

== Title 10, U.S.C Section 1034 ==
The act protects a United States Armed Forces member who makes a "protected communication" regarding a violation of law or regulation. The superiors of these service members are prohibited from retaliating against the service member making the protected statements. The Congressional statute is implemented by Department of Defense Directive 7050.06 (July 23, 2007), which protects:

(1) Any lawful communication to a member of Congress or an Inspector General.

(2) A communication which the Armed Forces’ member reasonably believes evidences a violation of law or regulation, including sexual harassment or unlawful discrimination, mismanagement, a gross waste of funds or other resources, an abuse of authority, or a substantial and specific danger to public health or safety.

But the communications must be made to one of the following:

(1) A member of Congress, an Inspector General, or a member of a Department of Defense audit, inspection, investigation, or law enforcement organization, or

(2) Any other person or organization (including any person or organization in the chain of command) designated under Component regulations or other established administrative procedures to receive such complaints.

== The 1998 Revisions ==
An October 1998 revision to Title 10, United States Code, Section 1034 (10 USC 1034), the "Military Whistleblower Protection Act," contained significant changes in how the Military Department Inspectors General and Office of the Inspector General, U.S. Department of Defense will process reprisal allegations. The most significant change in 1998 was that Military Department Inspectors General now have the authority to grant the protection and investigate the reprisal allegations they receive. This means that military members are no longer required to submit reprisal allegations directly with the Department of Defense Inspector General for coverage under 10 USC 1034.

== Effect of Uniform Code of Military Justice ==
Substantiated reprisal by a military member is punishable under Article 92, Uniform Code of Military Justice. Substantiated reprisal by a civilian employee is punishable under DOD regulations governing disciplinary or adverse actions. Members are not, however, immunized from responsibility for their own wrongdoing or inadequate performance by filing a complaint of reprisal. In the wake of a protected communication by a command member, a command having legitimate grounds for taking unfavorable personnel action against that member should thoroughly document the bases for all actions taken.

== Legislative & Statutory History ==
The statute was introduced by bill to the United States House of Representatives under the sponsorship of Congresswoman Barbara Boxer in 1985. In 1986, the substance of the Boxer bill was attached as an amendment to the FY1987 House Defense Authorization Act. The language failed in conference between the House and the United States Senate. The following year, the Inspector General of the U.S. Department of Defense was called to testify before the Defense Acquisition Policy Panel of the House Armed Services Committee. Also testifying were Defense whistleblowers Chief Petty Officer Michael R. Tufariello, U.S.N.R. and Major Peter C. Cole, U.S. Army National Guard, State of Texas.

In 1988, the Military Whistleblower Protection Act of 1988 was passed by the United States Congress to protect military members who make lawful disclosures of wrongdoing to Members of Congress or an Inspector General. It required the Office of the Inspector General, U.S. Department of Defense to investigate allegations of whistleblower reprisal. The statute was broadened in 1991 to protect disclosures to auditors, criminal investigators, inspectors and other Department of Defense law enforcement officers. In 1998, the Congress amended the statute to permit lesser Inspectors General to receive allegations and conduct investigations and retained oversight in the Office of Inspector General, U.S. Department of Defense.

== The 2013 Revisions ==
On December 12, 2013, the United States House of Representatives approved section 1714 of the National Defense Authorization Act for Fiscal Year 2014 overhauling the Military Whistleblower Protection Act of 1988. The Government Accountability Project, a nonprofit public interest group, praised the legislation as the "first significant advance in military whistleblower rights since they were enacted in 1988" and summarized its provisions as follows:

- Statute of Limitations: This period would expand from 60 days to one year, consistent with general best practice whistleblower protections.
- Protected Audiences: Audiences for protected disclosures would expand to include testimony to congressional and law enforcement staff, courts, grand jury and court martial proceedings.
- Closing Loopholes for Protected Speech: The reform closes the same loopholes that Congress eliminated in the civil service Whistleblower Protection Enhancement Act. Such loopholes include: A whistleblower is not protected if someone previously disclosed the same misconduct; oral disclosures not being covered; whistleblower motives being challenged, and whether the disclosure was made while on or off duty.
- Expansion of Protection against Forms of Harassment: The reforms ban retaliatory removal of duties inconsistent with rank.
- Independent Service Office of the Inspector General (OIG) investigations: The reforms require service-specific OIG investigations into reprisal to be handled by a higher organizational department than the one where alleged harassment occurred.
- Administrative Due Process Hearings: If not satisfied by OIG action, each member has the right to a Board for Correction of Military Records (BCMR) administrative due process hearing.

The bill was signed into law by President Barack Obama on December 26, 2013.

== Recent Litigation Under the Act ==
In May, 2022 former Army Public Health Center Commander Lt. Mark Bashaw was convicted of violating orders to present a COVID-19 test to his superiors, to wear a mask indoors and to telework at the Aberdeen Proving Ground in Maryland. The presiding judge declined to sentence him. Bashaw was subsequently joined by senior officers of all branches of the military in notifying Congress on August 15 that the Department of Defense is engaging in illegal and fraudulent acts that are endangering Service members and their families, as well as the American public whom the DOD is charged with protecting.

== See also ==
- Defense Office of Prepublication and Security Review
