= Food Chain Workers Alliance =

American coalition of worker-based organizations

- Founded: 2009
- Type: Worker center
- Purpose: Workers rights
- Method: Education, advocacy, organizing, policy
- Members: 17 member organizations, with 170,000 workers
- Key people: Joann Lo, Executive Director
- Website: foodchainworkers.org

The Food Chain Workers Alliance (FCWA) is a national coalition of 31 worker-based organizations of workers in many sectors of the food chain, including agriculture, processing, selling, and serving. Its program areas include strategic campaigns, leadership development, policy and standards, and education and communications. FCWA members represent over 300,000 workers. The Alliance is based in Los Angeles, California, and was founded in 2009.

== History ==
Prior to 2008, a number of organizations of workers along the food chain had been struggling with ways to integrate their work with the new national interest in food systems, and some had begun talking with each other about possible ways to collaborate with each other.

In January 2008 the Restaurant Opportunities Centers United (ROC United), thanks to a suggestion from a Jessie Smith Noyes Foundation program officer, organized an initial meeting of several organizations and in May 2008 convened eight organizations at the Labor Notes Conference in Detroit. At this meeting, the groups came together to get to know each other better, to share information on their work, and to talk about the idea of collaborating with each other. These groups included ROC United, the Center for New Community, the Coalition of Immokalee Workers, el Comité de Apoyo a los Trabajadores Agrícolas, the International Labor Rights Forum, and the Northwest Arkansas Workers' Justice Center (NWAWJC). All the groups decided that they did indeed want to work together – the real guiding vision that everybody agreed to at that point was that all of these organizations, with their high-stakes campaign experience, their membership, and their piece of the food chain, coming together would be incredibly strategic to build real power for all the workers along the food chain.

After the Labor Notes conference through quarterly conference calls the organizations continued to share information about their own campaigns and to support each other's campaigns whenever possible.

The groups then decided to hold an in-person retreat to talk more in-depth about what an alliance could do. Thanks to the Restaurant Opportunities Centers United, which raised funds from the Ford Foundation, nine organizations came together in Chicago in July 2009 to officially create the Food Chain Workers Alliance. In addition to the groups listed above, Just Harvest USA, the Restaurant Opportunities Center of New York, and the United Food and Commercial Workers Local 1500 also participated. NWAWJC could not attend but afterwards confirmed their membership in the Alliance.

At the meeting the DataCenter shared research that it had conducted on the work and the demographics of the membership of each organization and the possibility of common corporate targets among all the groups. Then the representatives of the nine organizations spent almost two days sharing experiences and talking about their vision for an alliance. Thus the Food Chain Workers Alliance was born.

== Program areas ==
Food Chain Workers Alliance program areas:

1. Worker Leadership and Solidarity
2. Movement Building

In June 2012, the FCWA released a comprehensive report on workers in the food system. This report is called "The Hands That Feed Us: Challenges and Opportunities for Workers Along the Food Chain."

The Alliance supports members' organizing campaigns, explores potential coordinated campaigns between various members of the Alliance, and acts in solidarity with other workers' organizations.

== Member organizations ==
1. Alliance for Fair Food
2. Brandworkers International
3. California Institute for Rural Studies
4. Cincinnati Interfaith Workers Center
5. Coalition of Immokalee Workers (CIW)
6. Comité de Apoyo a los Trabajadores Agrícolas (CATA)
7. Community to Community Development (C2C)
8. Fair World Project
9. Farmworker Association of Florida (FWAF)
10. International Labor Rights Forum (ILRF)
11. Migrant Justice
12. Mississippi Workers' Center for Human Rights
13. Northwest Arkansas Workers' Justice Center (NWAWJC)
14. OUR Walmart
15. Restaurant Opportunities Centers United (ROC-United)
16. Rural and Migrant Ministry
17. Street Vendor Project
18. UNITE HERE Food Service Division
19. UE Research and Education Fund (UEREF)
20. United Food and Commercial Workers Local 770 (UFCW Local 770)
21. Teamsters Joint Council 7
22. Warehouse Workers for Justice
23. Warehouse Workers Resource Center
