= 2022 United States Congress hearings on UFOs =

2022 United States congressional hearings on unexplained aerial phenomena

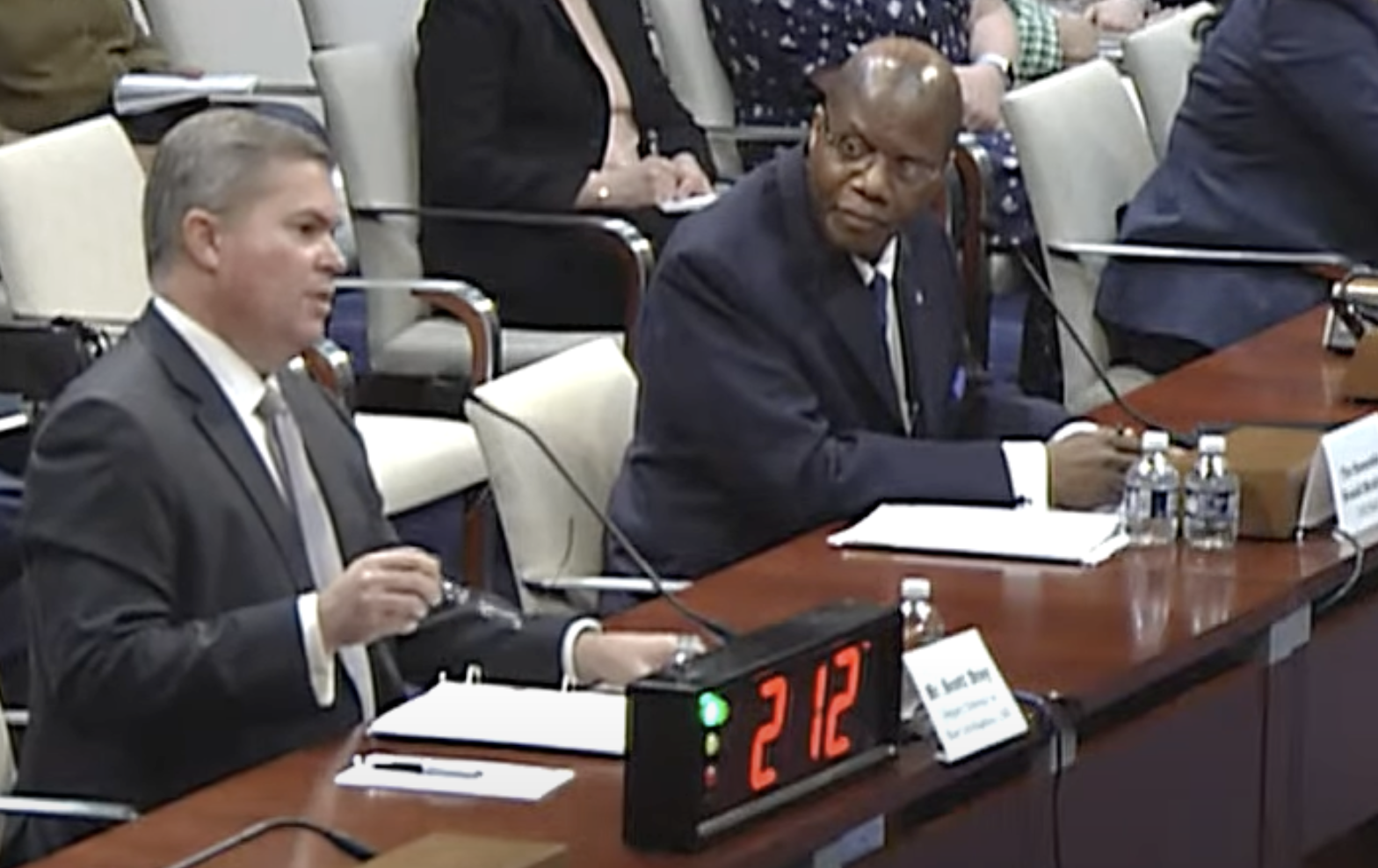
Scott Bray, deputy director of naval intelligence, and Ronald Moultrie, the Defense Department's under secretary for intelligence, testify to House Permanent Select Committee on Intelligence during the 17 May 2022 hearing.

On 17 May 2022, members of the United States House Intelligence Subcommittee on Counterterrorism, Counterintelligence and Counterproliferation held congressional hearings with top military officials to discuss military reports of unexplained aerial phenomena (UAPs). It was the first public congressional hearing into UFO sightings in the United States in over 50 years.

== Background ==
The last public congressional hearing on unexplained aerial phenomena had been held in 1969. Such hearings had their origins in 1966, when then-congressman Gerald Ford called for a formal investigation into sightings of unidentified flying objects (UFOs) following a string of reports. Project Blue Book, a U.S. Air Force program that collected, investigated, and analyzed reports of unidentified flying objects, was disbanded that same year, partly because it determined that the UFOs evaluated did not seem to pose any threat to national security.

In 2017, secretive attempts by the Pentagon to investigate unexplained aerial phenomena were reported on by national media.

In 2020, a COVID-19 relief and government funding bill signed by President Donald Trump included a stipulation that U.S. intelligence agencies deliver congressional intelligence committees with an unclassified report covering UAPs within 180 days.

An unclassified report was released in June 2021 by the U.S. Director of National Intelligence. It concluded that UFOs related to 144 incidents dating back to 2004 largely defied explanation, and called for further investigation and analysis.

On 23 November 2021, the Pentagon announced the establishment of the Airborne Object Identification and Management Synchronization Group (AOIMSG) to succeed the Navy's Unidentified Aerial Phenomena Task Force.

In December 2021, the National Defense Authorization Act for Fiscal Year 2022 signed by President Joe Biden included provisions for the establishment of a permanent agency to investigate unexplained aerial phenomena, codified at 50 U.S.C. § 3373. The Consolidated Appropriations Act, 2022 was signed in March 2022 and its main relevant provisions were codified at 50 U.S.C. § 3373a.

== Hearings ==
Rep. André Carson (D-IN), chairman of the subcommittee, opened the hearing. He raised the concern that UAPs posed a potential threat to national security and should be treated as such, and that the "stigma associated with UAPs has gotten in the way of good intelligence analysis". He criticized the Pentagon for failing to name a director to head the newly established Airborne Object Identification and Management Synchronization Group and for failing to provide any updates. Carson pledged to "bring the organization out of the shadows".

The hearings included testimony from Under Secretary of Defense for Intelligence and Security Ronald S. Moultrie, the Pentagon's top intelligence official, and Deputy Director of Naval Intelligence Scott Bray. Bray stated that the number of "frequent and continuing" reported sightings had grown to about 400 since last year's mandated report. He dismissed the notion that the UFOs had extraterrestrial origins, testifying that no organic/inorganic material or unexplainable wreckage indicated so. Bray added that there had been no attempts at communication with the objects, and that despite at least 11 "near-misses", no collisions between unidentified aircraft and U.S. aircraft had been reported so far.

It was revealed that other countries had similar reports on UFOs, and that a number of them communicated with U.S. intelligence agencies, although Moultrie told lawmakers that they did not want "potential adversaries to know exactly what we see or understand". He also mentioned the need for cooperation with the Federal Aviation Administration as well as other government agencies. Moultrie stated that most UFOs could be identified through "rigorous" analysis and investigation, but pointed out a number of incidents that defied explanation, such as a 2004 sighting where aircraft carrier pilots in the Pacific came across a hovering unidentified object that appeared to have rapidly descended tens of thousands of feet.

Lawmakers were shown declassified images and footage of UFOs, including a video of a UFO observed by a Navy fighter pilot in 2021, a "spherical object" that "quickly passes by the cockpit of the aircraft". Another video captured triangular objects (speculated to be drones) floating off the coast as seen through night-vision goggles.

A number of lawmakers, including Rick Crawford (R-AR), expressed concerns about potential Russian or Chinese hypersonic weapons programs. He warned that a failure to identify such threats was "tantamount to intelligence failure that we certainly want to avoid".

The standardization of the civilian reporting process was also discussed, as the majority of reports in the military's database were from military officers.

The public portion of the hearing, held in the morning and lasting less than 90 minutes, was followed by a private classified session in the afternoon.

== Reactions ==
Rep. Tim Burchett (R-TN) attended the hearing despite not being a member of the committee. He criticized what he perceived as the Pentagon's lack of transparency and their dismissiveness of the notion that the UFOs could be extraterrestrial aircraft.

Investigator and UFO skeptic Robert Sheaffer stated that he "didn't expect much from the hearings" and that he was not disappointed. He also derided the "ridiculous" footage shown at the hearing, saying: "They show this as some of their best evidence, and we are supposed not to laugh?"
