= Joseph D. Kernan =

Retired United States Navy admiral (born 1955)

Joseph Kernan
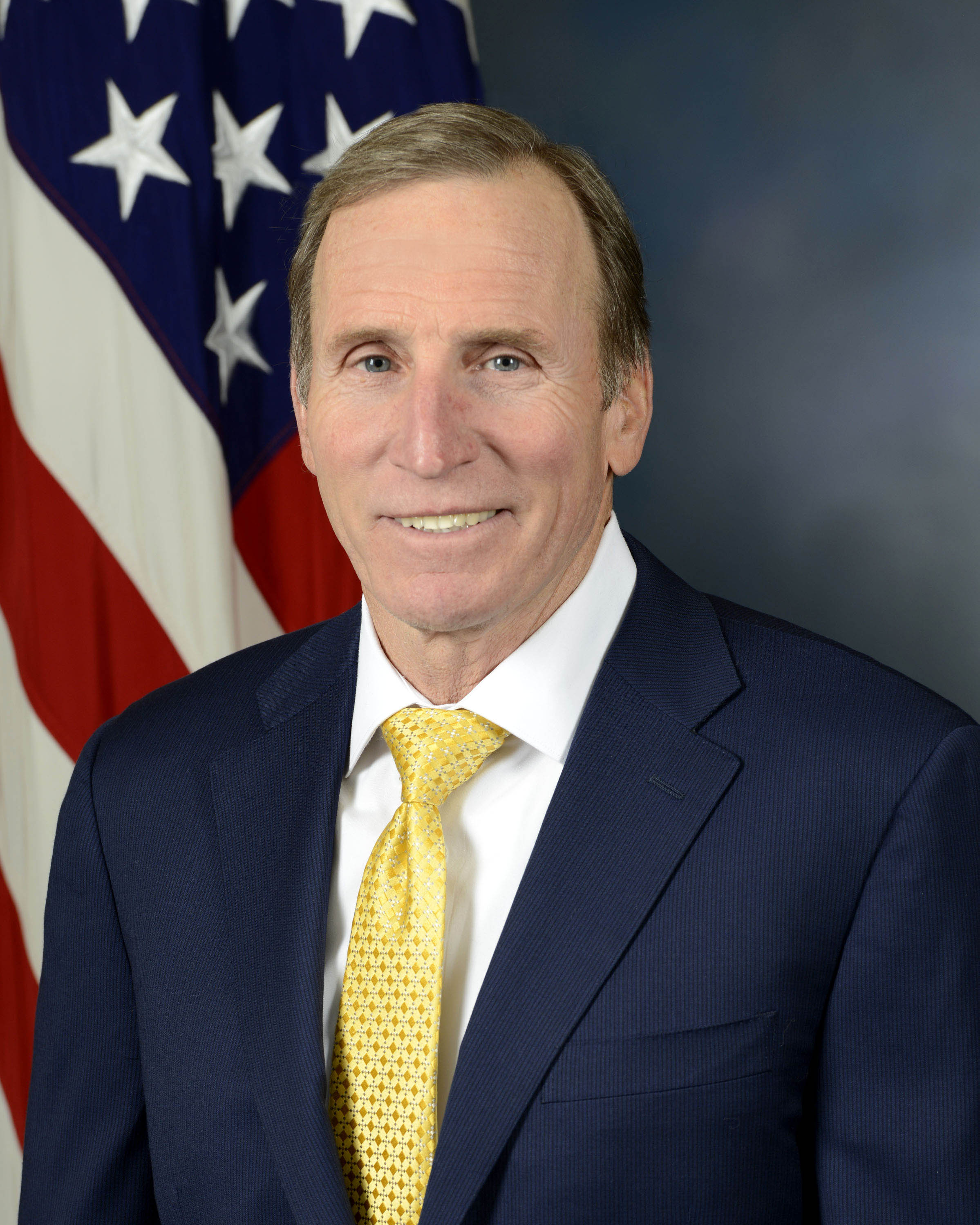

5th Under Secretary of Defense for Intelligence
- In office December 1, 2017 – November 10, 2020
- President: Donald Trump
- Preceded by: Marcel Lettre
- Succeeded by: Ronald Moultrie

Deputy commander of United States Southern Command
- In office May 2011 – September 2013
- President: Barack Obama
- Commander: Douglas M. Fraser; John F. Kelly

Personal details
- Born: Joseph Deveraux Kernan; February 4, 1955 (age 71) Travis Air Force Base, California, U.S.
- Education: United States Naval Academy (BS)

Military service
- Allegiance: United States
- Branch/service: United States Navy
- Years of service: 1977–2013
- Rank: Vice admiral
- Commands: United States Fourth Fleet; United States Naval Forces Southern Command; Naval Special Warfare Command; Naval Special Warfare Development Group; SEAL Team 2
- Awards: Defense Distinguished Service Medal (2); Navy Distinguished Service Medal (2); Defense Superior Service Medal (3); Legion of Merit (2); Bronze Star (3)

Joseph Devereux Kernan (born February 4, 1955) is a retired United States Navy vice admiral and the former under secretary of defense for intelligence. His last military assignment was serving as the military deputy commander of the United States Southern Command (USSOUTHCOM), Miami, Florida, from May 23, 2011, to September 2013. He was the second-in-command of one of nine unified commands under the Department of Defense.

Kernan formerly served as the senior military assistant to the secretary of defense from August 2009 to May 2011. Prior to that, he served as commander, United States Fourth Fleet and United States Naval Forces Southern Command from July 1, 2008, to June 12, 2009, and as commander, Naval Special Warfare Command from June 2007 to June 30, 2008. He assumed his final assignment on May 23, 2011.

Kernan was nominated as the fifth USD(I) on July 17, 2017, was confirmed by the Senate on November 17, 2017, and served until November 10, 2020, when Ezra Cohen replaced him as acting Undersecretary for Intelligence.

== Early life ==
Joseph Devereux Kernan was born February 4, 1955, at Travis Air Force Base, California, the son of a career Air Force pilot and Air Force nurse.

== Naval career ==
Kernan graduated from the United States Naval Academy in 1977 and received a commission as an ensign in the United States Navy. He attended Surface Warfare Officer School and reported to USS Horne (CG-30) based in San Diego, California. During his first tour, Kernan served as an engineering officer, completed deployments to the Western Pacific and Middle East regions and was designated a Surface Warfare Officer. Upon completion of his initial tour with the Surface Warfare community, Kernan received orders to Naval Amphibious Base Coronado for Basic Underwater Demolition/SEAL training. After six months of training, Kernan graduated with BUD/S class 117 in May 1982. Following SEAL Basic Indoctrination and completion of a six-month probationary period, he received the 1130 designator as a naval special warfare officer, entitled to wear the SEAL Trident. He commanded Platoons at Underwater Demolition Team 12, later redesigned as SEAL Delivery Vehicle Team 1, and SEAL Team FIVE. Additionally while assigned to SEAL Team 5, he served as Detachment officer-in-charge of four deployed SEAL platoons and deputy commander, Naval Special Warfare Task Force, Middle East Force. He later served as executive officer, Naval Special Warfare Unit 1 (NSWU1) at Naval Station Subic Bay, Republic of the Philippines. His staff positions included the naval special warfare officer detailer, operations officer, SEAL Team THREE, chief of staff and deputy commander at Naval Special Warfare Command and director, of Naval Special Warfare Branch on the Navy Staff. He later earned an M.S. in resource management from National Defense University in 1997.

Kernan served as commanding officer of SEAL Team TWO from 1994 to 1996. As a captain, he served as commanding officer of Naval Special Warfare Development Group from June 1999 to Aug 2003. His joint assignments include deputy director and director of operations, Joint Special Operations Command, Fort Bragg, North Carolina, and director of operations, Center for Special Operations, United States Special Operations Command, MacDill AFB, Tampa, Florida.

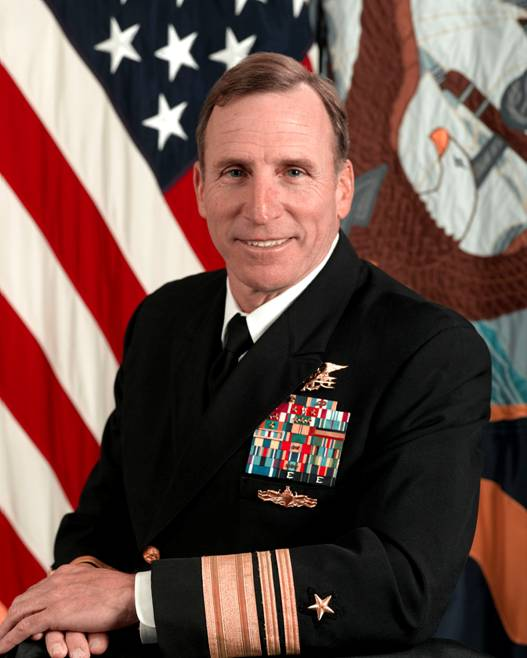
Vice Admiral Joseph D. Kernan, while serving as the senior military assistant to the secretary of defense, August 2009.

Kernan assumed duties as commander, Naval Special Warfare Command in June 2007.

On April 24, 2008, Admiral Gary Roughead, the chief of naval operations, announced that the United States Fourth Fleet would be re-established, effective July 1, with responsibility for United States Navy ships, aircraft and submarines operating in the Caribbean Sea, as well as throughout Central and South America, with Kernan as the fleet commander, as well as commander, United States Naval Forces Southern Command, the naval component of the United States Southern Command. Kernan became the first Navy SEAL to serve as a numbered fleet commander.

On May 19, 2009, Defense Secretary Robert Gates announced that President Barack Obama had selected Kernan for appointment to the rank of vice admiral and assignment as senior military assistant to the secretary of defense. He assumed the assignment in June 2009. In May 2011, he was assigned as deputy commander United States Southern Command until his retirement in September 2013.

== Later career ==
After his military retirement, Kernan served as Senior Vice President of Corporate Development for SAP National Security Services.

On July 17, 2017, President Donald Trump announced his intention to nominate Kernan to the position of Under Secretary of Defense for Intelligence. His nomination was confirmed by the Senate on November 16, 2017. On November 10, 2020, Kernan retired from government service. Ezra Cohen replaced him as the acting Undersecretary for Intelligence.

== Business activities and board memberships ==
Kernan also serves as the chairman of NS2 Serves, a "veteran training and employment program," as well as on the board of directors for both the National Navy SEAL Museum and The Mission Continues, a nonprofit founded by former Missouri governor and former SEAL, Eric Greitens.

In September 2017, Joe returned to SAP NS2 where he now works as Chief Security Officer. He and his wife Jan also run a well-known vineyard in Leesburg, Virginia called Bleufrog Vineyards.

== Personal life ==
Kernan and his wife, Janet, have two children: Sean and Shannon.

== Awards and decorations ==
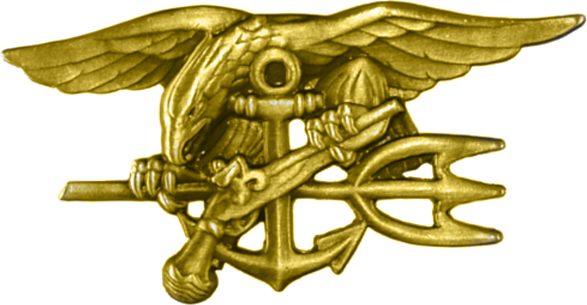
Naval Special Warfare insignia
Surface Warfare Officer insignia
Naval Parachutist Badge

Defense Distinguished Service Medal with one oak leaf cluster
Navy Distinguished Service Medal with 5/16 Gold Star
Defense Superior Service Medal with two oak leaf clusters
Legion of Merit with 5/16 Gold Star
Bronze Star Medal with w/ Combat "V" and two 5/16 Gold Star
Defense Meritorious Service Medal
Meritorious Service Medal with two gold award stars
Navy and Marine Corps Commendation Medal with three gold award stars
Joint Service Achievement Medal
Navy and Marine Corps Achievement Medal with one gold award star
Combat Action Ribbon
Presidential Unit Citation
Joint Meritorious Unit Award
Navy Unit Commendation
Navy Meritorious Unit Commendation
Navy Expeditionary Medal
National Defense Service Medal with two bronze service stars
Armed Forces Expeditionary Medal
Global War on Terrorism Expeditionary Medal
Global War on Terrorism Service Medal
Armed Forces Service Medal
Humanitarian Service Medal
Navy Sea Service Deployment Ribbon with three bronze service stars
Navy and Marine Corps Overseas Service Ribbon
NATO Medal for Yugoslavia
Navy Expert Rifleman Medal
Navy Expert Pistol Shot Medal

== Image gallery ==
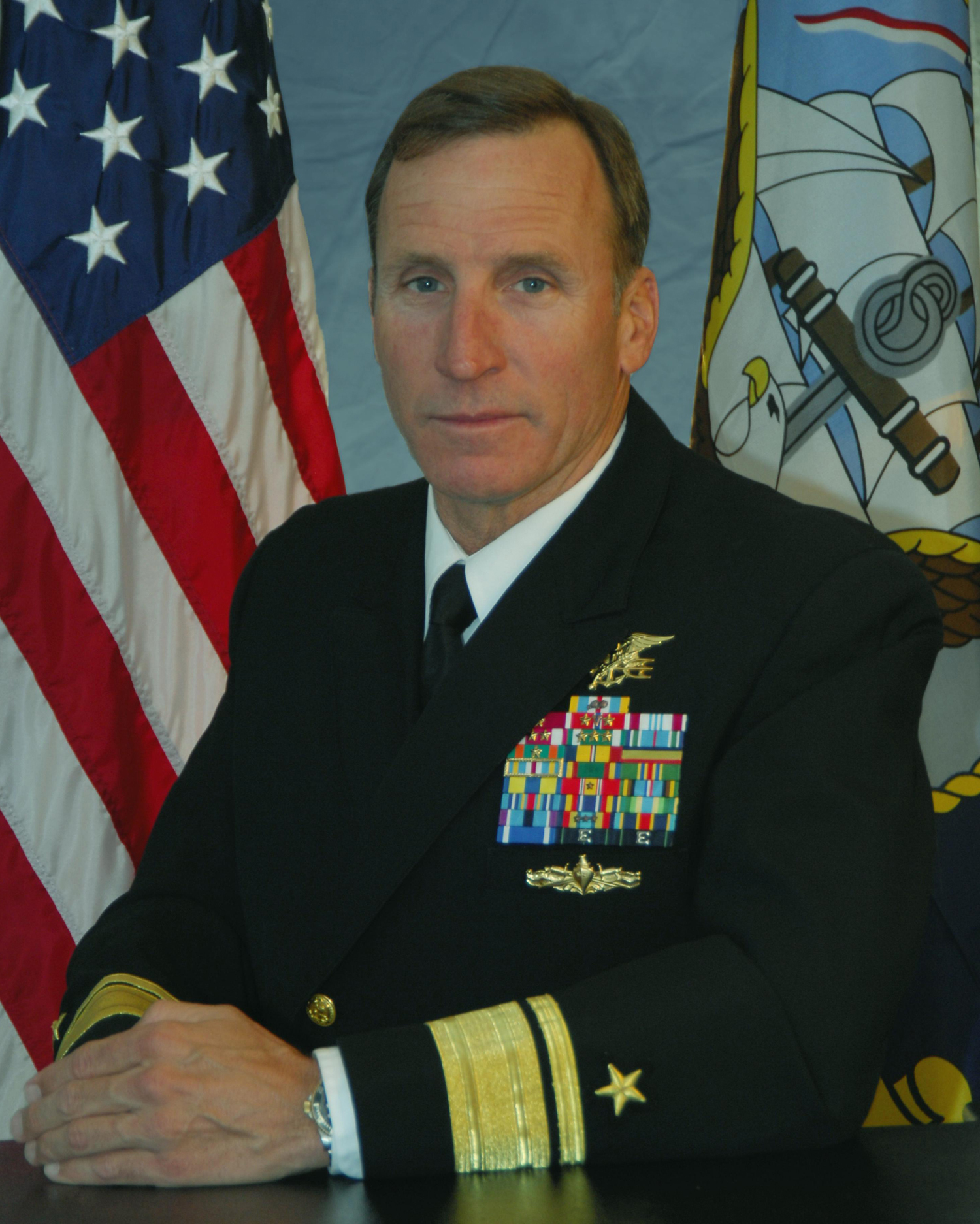
Then-Rear Admiral Joseph D. Kernan while serving as Commander, United States Fourth Fleet and Commander, U.S. Naval Forces Southern Command.

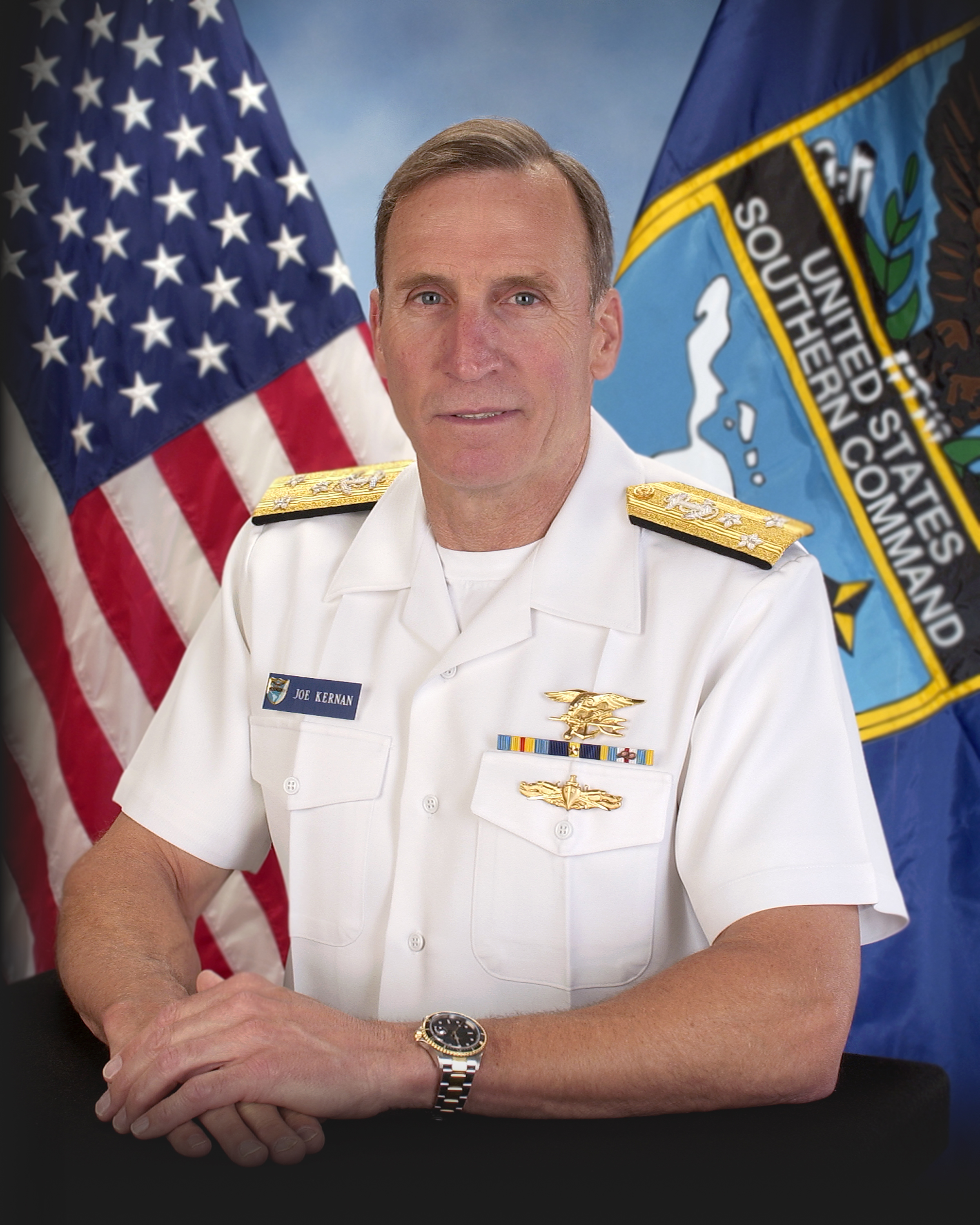
Vice Admiral Joseph D. Kernan, while serving as Deputy Commander, U.S. Southern Command, in Navy service whites.

Military offices
Preceded by ???	Commander of the Naval Special Warfare Command; 2007–2008	Succeeded by ???
Preceded by James W. Stevenson Jr.	Commander of United States Naval Forces Southern Command; 2008–2009	Succeeded by Victor G. Guillory
Preceded by James W. Stevenson Jr.	Commander of the United States Fourth Fleet; 2008–2009	Succeeded by Victor G. Guillory
Preceded by David M. Rodriguez	Senior military assistant to the Secretary of Defense; 2009–2011	Succeeded by John F. Kelly
Preceded by Ken Keen	Military deputy commander of United States Southern Command; 2011–2013	Succeeded by Kenneth E. Tovo
Government offices
Preceded by Marcel Lettre	United States Under Secretary of Defense for Intelligence; 2017–2020	Succeeded by Ezra Cohen-Watnick; Acting
