= Task Force 76 =

United States Navy task force

Task Force 76 / Amphibious Force U.S. Seventh Fleet / Expeditionary Strike Group SEVEN
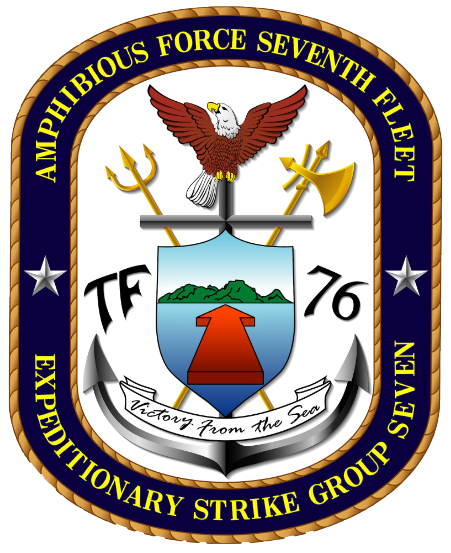
- Active: 1943 to present
- Country: United States of America
- Branch: United States Navy
- Type: Expeditionary Strike Group
- Role: Amphibious Operations
- Part of: United States Seventh Fleet
- Garrison/HQ: White Beach Naval Facility
- Motto: Forward From the Sea
- Flagship: USS Blue Ridge (AGC-2); USS Blue Ridge (LCC-19)

Commanders
- Current commander: RADM Thomas Shultz
- Notable commanders: VADM Daniel E. Barbey

Expeditionary Strike Group SEVEN/Task Force 76 (Amphibious Force U.S. SEVENTH Fleet) is a United States Navy task force. It is part of the United States Seventh Fleet and the USN's only permanently forward-deployed expeditionary strike group. It is based at the White Beach Naval Facility at the end of the Katsuren Peninsula in Uruma City, Okinawa, Japan.

Originally stood up to handle the unique amphibious warfare requirements presented by the Pacific War, Commander, Task Force 76 (CTF 76) continues to conduct such operations throughout the U.S. Seventh Fleet area of operations, which includes the Western Pacific Ocean and the Indian Ocean.

== History ==
1943 – Southwest Pacific Amphibious Force, later called the VII Amphibious Force (VII AF), was stood up on 10 January in Brisbane, Australia by RADM Daniel E. Barbey to capitalize on the lessons learned from the Guadalcanal campaign of the necessity of amphibious warfare in the Pacific. Barbey was the author of Fleet Training Publication 167 – Landing Operations Doctrine, United States Navy, published in 1940, and is considered Navy's bible on amphibious warfare.

VII AF participated in Operation Chronicle, the landing at Lae, the landing at Scarlet Beach at Finschhafen, Battle of Arawe and Battle of Cape Gloucester on the island of New Britain.

1944 – VII AF acquired USS Blue Ridge (AGC-2) as a flagship, the first of two separate flagships named Blue Ridge. She served as flagship during VII TF's participation in the landing at Hollandia, landing at Aitape, landing at Saidor and Admiralty Islands campaign.

July 1945 - Mine sweeping operations in the Philippines. Roll-up of men and material from New Guinea and the Solomons. Preparing for final assault on Japan

September 1945 - World War 2 end with the Surrender of Japan.

December 1945 - VII Amphibious Force is disestablished due to completion of its mission.

1950-1955 - Although VII Amphibious Force was not formally reestablished during the Korean War, U.S. Naval forces under United Nations Command and General Douglas MacArthur made use of the lessons learned by VII AF in the establishment of the short-lived Amphibious Task Force 90, which used former elements of VII AF and participated in the amphibious landings at Inchon and the evacuation of the French and Vietnamese allies in Operation Passage to Freedom.

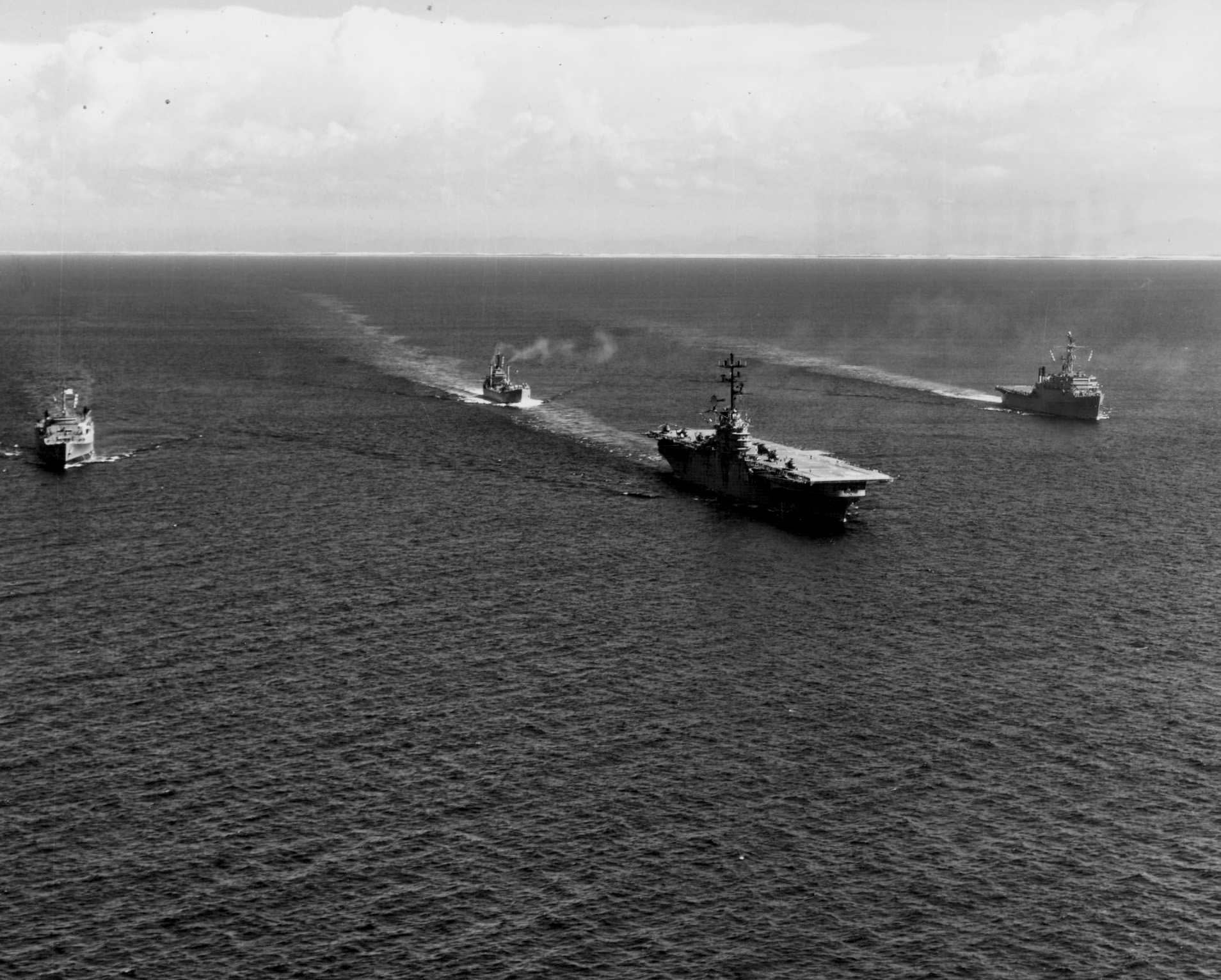
Amphibious Ready Group Alpha with USS Princeton (LPH-5) off Vietnam, in 1968.

1965 – Seventh Fleet Amphibious Ready Groups are reformed by Naval Support Activity Danang (NSA) to participate in amphibious landings, assaults and demonstrations off the eastern coast of the Republic of Vietnam in support of the III Marine Amphibious Force (III MAF) in overall command. Amphibious Ready Group Alpha, and its U.S. Marine contingent "Special Landing Force Alpha" or SLF-A (often referred to as "Sluff") formed Task Group 76.4.

TG 76.4 consisted of various support vessels, such as USS Princeton (LPH-5), USS Okinawa (LPH-3) and USS Iwo Jima (LPH-2). Other vessels included LSTs (Landing Ship Tank) or LSD (Landing Ship Dock) which supported a reinforced Marine Corps battalion referred to as a Battalion Landing Team (BLT). It was during this period that the second Blue Ridge (USS Blue Ridge (LCC-19)) first served as a flagship, along with USS Eldorado (AGC-11), USS Estes (AGC-12) and USS Mount McKinley (AGC-7).

1970 – The Seventh Amphibious Force is formally stood up again under the Seventh Fleet by RADM Walter D. Gaddis.

1975 – Rescued more than 100,000 people from Phnom Penh and Saigon (including in Operation Eagle Pull). Also assisted in recovery of the American-flagged SS Mayaguez after it was hijacked by the Cambodian Khmer Rouge in the Gulf of Thailand.

1983 – Transited to Suez Canal to support multi-national forces in Lebanon.

1999 – The USS Belleau Wood Amphibious Ready Group would be stood up with no-notice for a five-month deployment in the Persian Gulf for Operation Desert Fox.

2000 – Belleau Wood and USS Juneau complete humanitarian mission to East Timor supporting Australian-led forces. Continued missions until East Timor became 191st member of United Nations in 2002.

2004 – USS Essex and USS Fort McHenry deploy to Indonesia in support of Operation Unified Assistance to provide support and aid to the victims of the 26 December tsunami in Southeast Asia.

2005 – Forward Deployed Amphibious Ready Group returns to Sasebo, Japan following unscheduled eight-month surge deployment to North Persian Gulf in support of Operation Iraqi Freedom and the global war on terrorism.

2005 – Forward Deployed ARG deploys for Fall Patrol. Conduct Amphibious Landing Exercise/Talon Vision (PHIBLEX/TV) 06 in the Republic of Philippines and then make a port visit to Hong Kong.

2006 – Forward Deployed ARG deploys for 5-month Spring Patrol, participating in TRUEX/MUEX in Guam, Balikatan 06 in the Republic of Philippines, Foal Eagle 06 in the Republic of Korea (ROK) and Cobra Gold in the Kingdom of Thailand.

2006 – USS Patriot and embarked Explosive Ordnance Disposal Mobile Unit 5 Detachment (Det) 51 complete Summer Patrol throughout Southeast Asia, participating in Cobra Gold and WP-MCMEX in Malaysia, while making port visits to Brunei, Vietnam, Singapore and Hong Kong.

2007 – Forward Deployed ARG participates in joint exercises with the Republic of Korea, Kingdom of Thailand, Australia, Japan, Kingdom of Cambodia, Socialist Republic of Vietnam and the Republic of the Philippines. Task Force 76 units also participated in Operation Sea Angel II, a disaster response mission in the People's Republic of Bangladesh.

2009 – Between 7 August and 18 October, Task Force 76 assigned forces supported Foreign Humanitarian Assistance and Disaster Relief operations in Taiwan, Indonesia and the Republic of the Philippines.

2011 – Operation TOMODACHI: USS Essex (LHD-2), USS Tortuga (LSD-46), USS Harpers Ferry (LSD-49) and USS Germantown (LSD-42) were positioned off of north eastern Honshu to assist the disaster recovery efforts in conjunction with the Japan Self Defense Force.

2011 – USS Tortuga (LSD-46) assisted in flood relief efforts in Thailand along with elements of the 31st Marine Expeditionary Unit.

2012 – Task Force 76 and assigned units directly participated in 12 bi-lateral exercises including Balikatan, Amphibious Landing Exercise, and Explosive Ordnance Disposal Exercise in the Republic of the Philippines, Cobra Gold in Thailand, Foal Eagle, Clear Horizon and Korean Interoperability Training Program in the Republic of Korea, Valiant Shied, Terminal Fury and Keen Sword in Japan.

2022 - CTF-76 and 3rd Marine Expeditionary Brigade (3d MEB) merged operationally as an integrated naval headquarters to create Expeditionary Strike Group Seven (ESG-7) with Commander, Task Force 76 would serve as Commander of the joint Task Force 76/3, and Commander 3d MEB as deputy commander.

== Forward-deployed CTF 76 ships and commands ==
CTF 76 currently consists of the following units:

=== U.S. Fleet Activities Yokosuka, Japan ===
- USS Blue Ridge (LCC-19)

=== U.S. Fleet Activities Sasebo, Japan ===
- Amphibious Squadron ELEVEN
- USS Tripoli (LHA-7)
- USS New Orleans (LPD-18)
- USS Rushmore (LSD-47)
- Naval Beach Unit SEVEN
- Assault Craft Unit ONE, Detachment Western Pacific
- Assault Craft Unit FIVE, Detachment Western Pacific
- Beach Master Unit ONE, Detachment Western Pacific

=== Okinawa, Japan ===
- Fleet Surgical Team SEVEN
- Tactical Air Squadron TWELVE, Detachment Western Pacific

=== Pohang, Republic of Korea ===
- Helicopter Mine Countermeasures Squadron 14, Detachment ONE

=== Guam, United States ===
- Helicopter Sea Combat Squadron TWO FIVE

=== Transiting Amphibious Ready Groups ===
United States-based Amphibious Ready Groups which pass through the U.S. Seventh Fleet area of operations fall under the operational control of CTF 76.

== Task Force / Amphibious Group Commanders to present ==
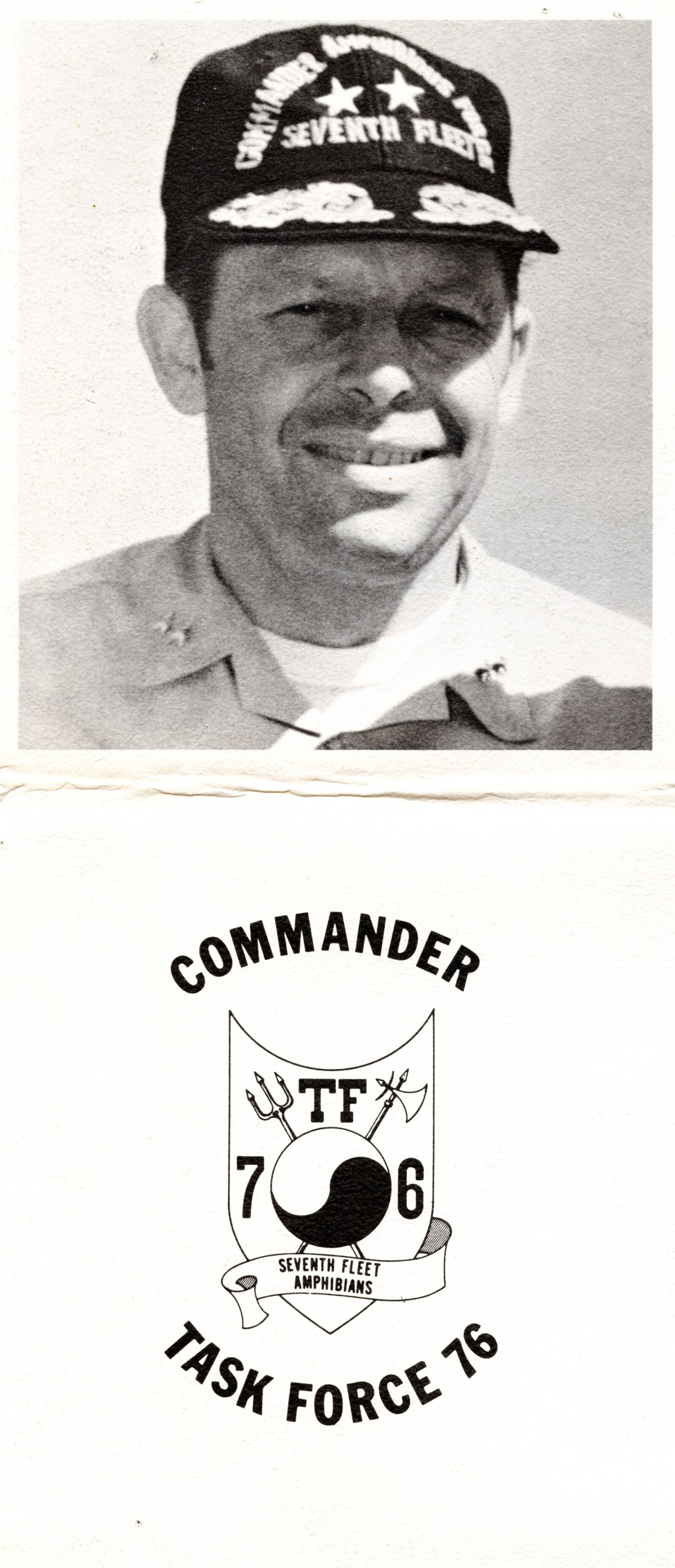
CTF 76 RADM Gaddis with old crest (1972)

• RADM Brian Mutty	(15 JUN 2026 - present)
• RADM Thomas Shultz	(APR 2025 - JUN 2026)
• RADM Christopher D. Stone	(JUN 2023 – APR 2025)
• RADM Derek A. Trinque	(JUN 2022 – JUN 2023)
• RADM Christopher M. Engdahl	(MAY 2021 – JUN 2022)
• RADM Fred W. Kacher	(MAY 2019 – MAY 2021)
• RADM Charles B. Cooper II	(JAN 2018 – MAY 2019)
• CAPT Marvin "Ed" Thompson	(SEP 2017 – JAN 2018)
• RADM Marc H. Dalton	(AUG 2016 – SEP 2017)
• RADM John B. Nowell	(AUG 2015 – AUG 2016)
• RADM Hugh D. Wetherald	(SEP 2013 – AUG 2015)
• RADM Jeffrey A. Harley	(MAY 2012 – SEP 2013)
• RADM J. Scott Jones	(APR 2011 – MAY 2012)
• RADM Richard B. Landolt	(JUN 2008 – APR 2011)
• RADM Carol M. Pottenger	(NOV 2006 – JUN 2008)
• RADM Victor G. Guillory	(OCT 2004 – NOV 2006)
• RADM Gary R. Jones	(JUL 2003 – OCT 2004)
• RADM Frederic R. Ruehe	(MAR 2002 – JUL 2003)
• RADM Paul S. Schultz	(JUN 2000 – MAR 2002)
• RADM Harry M. Highfill	(MAR 1998 – JUN 2000)
• RADM R. C. Chaplin	(DEC 1996 – MAR 1998)
• RADM Walter Doran	(JUN 1995 – DEC 1996)
• RADM John Sigler	(1992 – 1995)
• RADM Dennis R. Conley	(1990 – 1992)
• RADM Henri B. Chase	(1988 – 1990)
• RADM George B. Shick Jr.	(1980 – 1982)
• RADM Don Whitmire	(1974–1976)
• RADM Wycliff D. Toole Jr	(1972 – 1973)
• RADM Walter D. Gaddis	(1970 - 1972)
• RADM Edwin M. Rosenberg^{cpr}	(1968 - 1970)
• RADM Paul L. Lacy Jr.^{cpr}	(1967 - 1968)
• RADM Thomas R. Weschler^{cpr}	(1966 - 1967)
• CAPT Kenneth P. Huff^{cpr}	(1965 – 1967)
• RADM Lyman A. Thackery^{tf90}	(1950 - 1951)
• VADM Daniel E. Barbey	(JAN 1943 - DEC 1945 )

^{cpr} - As commander of Naval Support Activity Danang and COMPHIBRON 3 supporting III Marine Amphibious Force
^{tf90} - As commander of Task Force 90 and COMPHIBRON 3 under United Nations Command
