= Ronald Moultrie =

American intelligence official

Ron Moultrie
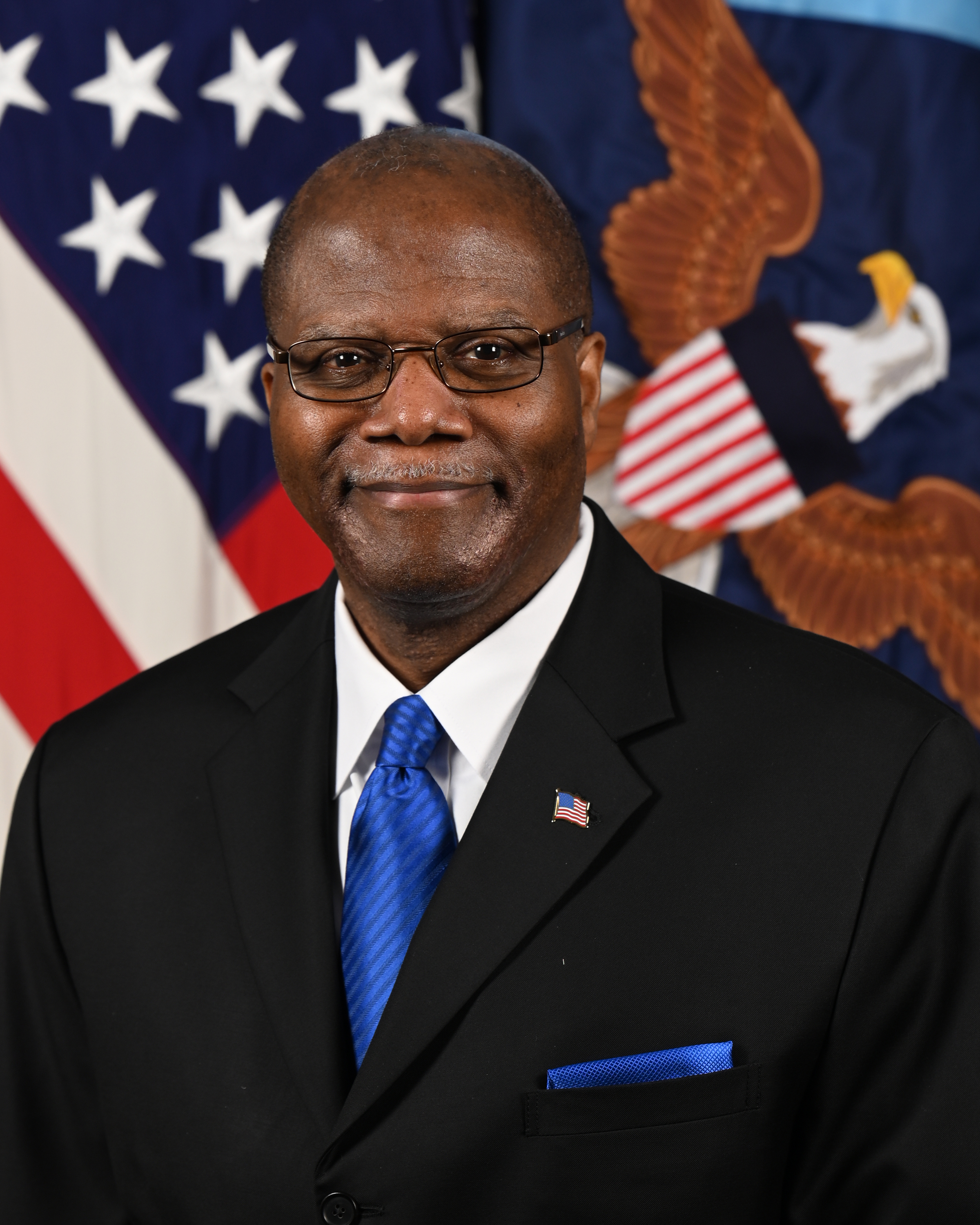

Under Secretary of Defense for Intelligence and Security
- In office June 1, 2021 – February 29, 2024
- President: Joe Biden
- Preceded by: Joseph D. Kernan
- Succeeded by: Bradley Hansell

Personal details
- Education: University of Maryland, College Park (BA); National Intelligence University (MS)

Military service
- Branch/service: United States Air Force

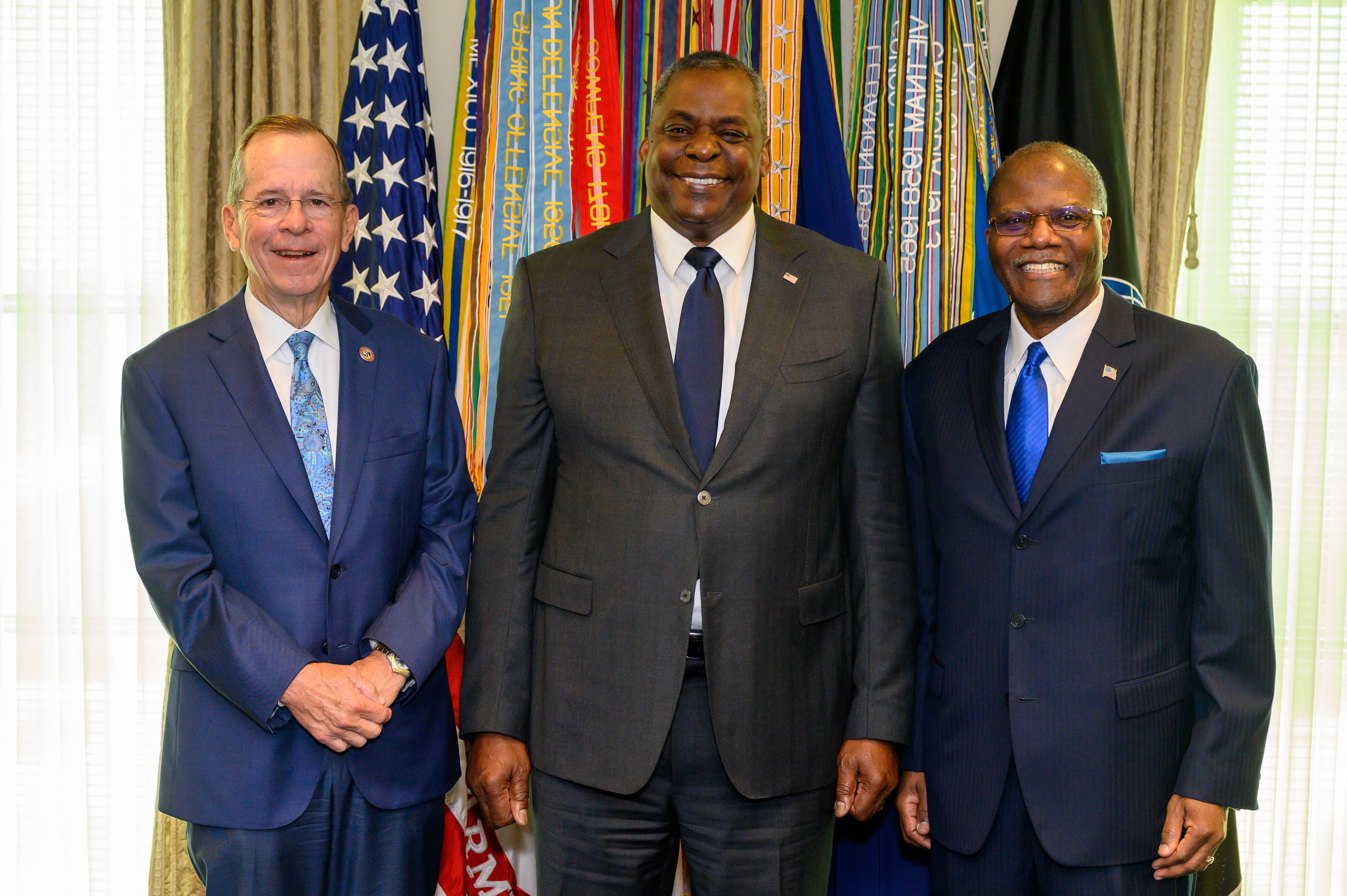
Under Secretary of Defense for Intelligence and Security Ronald Moultrie with Secretary of Defense Lloyd Austin and Admiral Michael Mullen at The Pentagon on June 1, 2021.

Ronald S. "Ron" Moultrie is an American intelligence official who served as the under secretary of defense for intelligence and security in the Biden administration. He assumed office on June 1, 2021, after he was confirmed on May 29 by the Senate.

== Education ==
Moultrie earned a Bachelor of Arts degree from the University of Maryland, College Park and a Master of Science from the National Intelligence University. He also holds a Russian language degree from the Defense Language Institute and has completed studies at the Harvard Kennedy School.

== Career ==
Moultrie served as a Russian linguist in the United States Air Force. He later worked as an advisor to the United States Secretary of the Navy. Moultrie worked as an officer in the Central Intelligence Agency before joining the National Security Agency, where he eventually served as the director of the National Security Operations Center. Moultrie also worked as an advisor in the office of the director of National Intelligence.

At a June 2021 House Armed Services Committee hearing on collaboration between the defense and intelligence communities, Moultrie said the government must improve defense-intelligence information sharing both internally and with trusted foreign allies.

On 17 May 2022, Moultrie provided testimony at a congressional hearing regarding unexplained aerial phenomena.
