= Fred Kacher =

U.S. Navy admiral

Fred W. Kacher
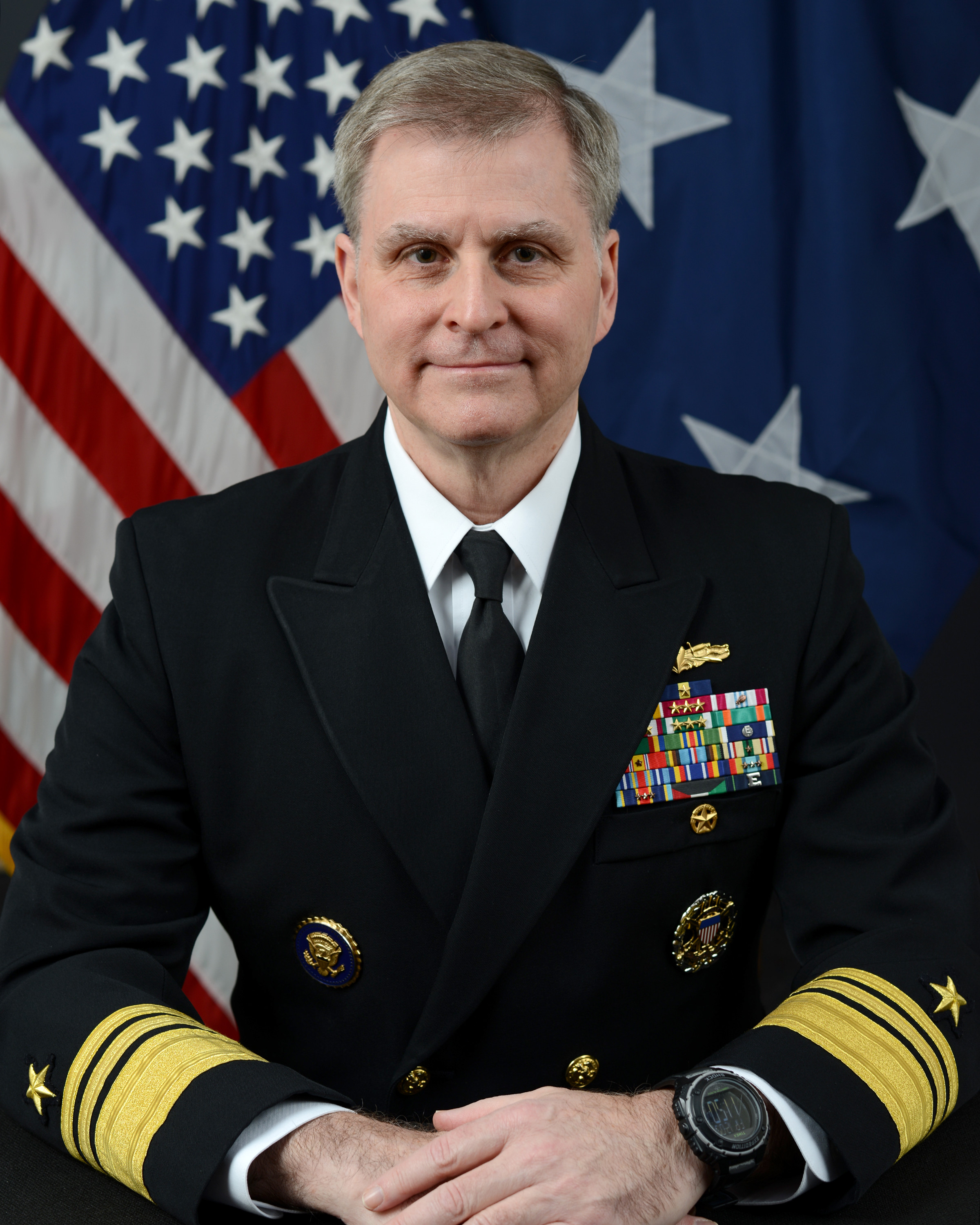
- Official portrait, 2025
- Born: 1968 (age 57–58)
- Education: United States Naval Academy (BS); Harvard University (MA)
- Military career
- Allegiance: United States
- Branch: United States Navy
- Service years: 1990-present
- Rank: Vice Admiral
- Commands: Director of the Joint Staff; United States Seventh Fleet; United States Naval Academy; Expeditionary Strike Group 7; Destroyer Squadron 7; USS Stockdale (DDG-106)
- Conflicts: Gulf War
- Awards: Navy Distinguished Service Medal (2); Defense Superior Service Medal; Legion of Merit (4)

Frederick William Kacher (born 1968) is a United States Navy vice admiral and former director of the Joint Staff. He served as the commander of the United States Seventh Fleet from February 15, 2024. He also served as the acting superintendent of the United States Naval Academy from August 2023 to January 2024. He previously served as vice director for operations of the Joint Staff from June 2022 to June 2023. He served as the assistant deputy chief of naval operations for operations, plans, and strategy of the United States Navy from May 2021 to June 2022, and prior to that, he served as the Commander of Expeditionary Strike Group 7.

== Early life and education ==
Raised in Oakton, Virginia, Kacher graduated from the United States Naval Academy in 1990 with a Bachelor of Science in English. He later earned a Master of Public Policy degree with a concentration in international relations from the Kennedy School at Harvard University.

Kacher is the author of the "Newly Commissioned Naval Officer's Guide" (first edition 2009, second edition 2018) and co-author with fellow Naval Academy alumnus Douglas Robb of the "Naval Officer's Guide to the Pentagon" (2019).

== Military career ==
In June 2022, Kacher was assigned as vice director for operations of the Joint Staff.

In January 2023, Kacher was nominated for promotion to vice admiral and assignment as commander of the United States Seventh Fleet. In June 2025, he was nominated for reappointment as a vice admiral and assignment as director of the Joint Staff.

== Awards and decorations ==

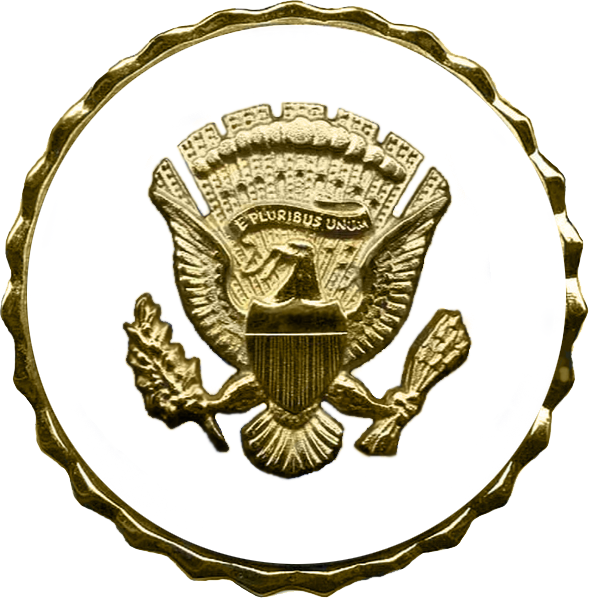

Surface Warfare Officer Pin
Navy Distinguished Service Medal with one gold award star	Defense Superior Service Medal w/ 2 bronze oak leaf clusters	
Legion of Merit w/ 3 gold award stars	Defense Meritorious Service Medal w/ 1 bronze oak leaf cluster	Meritorious Service Medal w/ 3 gold award stars
Navy and Marine Corps Commendation Medal w/ 3 gold award stars	Navy and Marine Corps Achievement Medal	Navy Unit Commendation
Navy Meritorious Unit Commendation	Navy E Ribbon w/ 4 Battle E devices	National Defense Service Medal w/ 1 bronze service star
Armed Forces Expeditionary Medal	Southwest Asia Service Medal w/ 1 bronze service star	Global War on Terrorism Expeditionary Medal
Global War on Terrorism Service Medal	Navy Sea Service Deployment Ribbon w/ 7 service stars	Navy and Marine Corps Overseas Service Ribbon w/ 7 service stars
Kuwait Liberation Medal (Kuwait)	Navy Expert Pistol Shot Medal Order of the Rising Sun, 2nd Class, Gold and Silver Star	
Command at Sea insignia
Office of the Joint Chiefs of Staff Identification Badge
Vice Presidential Service Badge

Military offices
Preceded by Charles Cooper II	Commander of Expeditionary Strike Group 7; 2019–2021	Succeeded by Christopher M. Engdahl
Preceded by Sean Buck	Superintendent of the United States Naval Academy; Acting; 2023–2024	Succeeded by Yvette M. Davids
Preceded by Karl O. Thomas	Commander of the United States Seventh Fleet; 2024–2025	Succeeded by Patrick J. Hannifin
Preceded by Stephen Liszewski; Acting	Director of the Joint Staff; 2025–2026	Vacant
