= United States Naval Forces Southern Command =

Naval element of United States Southern Command

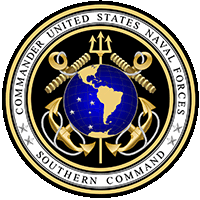
- United States Naval Forces Southern Command Emblem
- Active: 1963 - 1975; 1985 - 1991; 2000 - present
- Country: United States
- Branch: US Navy
- Type: Theater Command
- Part of: United States Southern Command (USSOUTHCOM)
- Garrison/HQ: Naval Station Mayport, Florida

Commanders
- Current commander: Rear Admiral Carlos A. Sardiello

U.S. Naval Forces Southern Command (also known as USNAVSO) is the naval element of United States Southern Command (USSOUTHCOM). Its areas of operation include South America, Central America, the Caribbean and surrounding waters. Its headquarters are located at Naval Station Mayport, Florida. USNAVSO is currently under the command of Rear Admiral Carlos A. Sardiello.

== Mission ==
USNAVSO and U.S. Fourth Fleet supports USSOUTHCOM joint and combined full spectrum military operations by providing principally sea-based, forward presence to ensure freedom of maneuver in the maritime domain, to foster and sustain cooperative relationships with international partners and to fully exploit the sea as maneuver space in order to enhance regional security and promote peace, stability, and prosperity in the Caribbean, Central and South American regions.

== History ==
From 1941 to 1945, the South Atlantic Forces of the United States Atlantic Fleet operated under four different designations -- Task Force 3, Task Force 23 (15 September 1942, titled South Atlantic Force), United States Fourth Fleet, and finally Task Force 27. In September 1942, the Commander Task Force 23 was further designated Commander South Atlantic Force, a title which he retained while becoming Commander Fourth Fleet and CTF 27. The extensive operations built up in Brazil were run down swiftly after the end of the war.

In June 1958 Commander, South Atlantic Force, U.S. Atlantic Fleet (COMSOLANT) was established in headquarters at Naval Base Trinidad, and was moved to Roosevelt Roads, Puerto Rico in 1973. COMSOLANT participated in annual "UNITAS" deployments around South America since 1960, and routinely deployed to Africa for the West African Training Cruise since 1980.

United States Naval Forces Southern Command (USNAVSO) was established in February 2000, with headquarters at Naval Station Roosevelt Roads, Puerto Rico which in early 2004 relocated to Naval Station Mayport, Florida. On February 28, 2023, the command short title officially changed to USNAVSOUTH. COMUSNAVSO was built around the core of COMSOLANT. COMUSNAVSO serves as a main link between the U.S. Navy and the navies of South America, Central America, and the Caribbean, and is at the forefront of U.S. engagement in the Western Hemisphere. The command consolidates functions previously conducted by the Commander, Western Hemisphere Group, formerly in Mayport, Florida and COMSOLANT, formerly located at Naval Station Roosevelt Roads, Puerto Rico.

In addition to UNITAS, COMUSNAVSO, participates in navy-to-navy exercises, counter-drug operations, port visits, humanitarian missions, disaster relief, and protocol events. COMUSNAVSO exercises military command and control of all assigned ships and unit, and represents the U.S. Southern Command with respect to naval matters in the region.

== Commanders ==
- Rear Admiral Kevin P. Green (10 December 1999 - September 2002)
- Rear Admiral Vinson E. Smith (September 2002 - 2 September 2005)
- Rear Admiral James W. Stevenson Jr. (2 September 2005 - 12 July 2008)
- Rear Admiral Joseph D. Kernan (12 July 2008 - 12 June 2009)
- Rear Admiral Victor G. Guillory (12 June 2009 - 5 August 2011)
- Rear Admiral Kurt W. Tidd (5 August 2011 - 22 June 2012)
- Rear Admiral Sinclair M. Harris (22 June 2012 – April 17, 2014)
- Rear Admiral George W. Ballance (April 17, 2014 – August 12, 2016)
- Rear Admiral Sean S. Buck (August 12, 2016 – May 21, 2019)
- Rear Admiral Donald D. Gabrielson (May 21, 2019 - September 2, 2021)
- Rear Admiral James A. Aiken Jr. (September 3, 2021 - July 2024)
- Rear Admiral Carlos A. Sardiello (July 2024 - present)
