= James A. Aiken =

U.S. Navy admiral

James A. Aiken Jr.
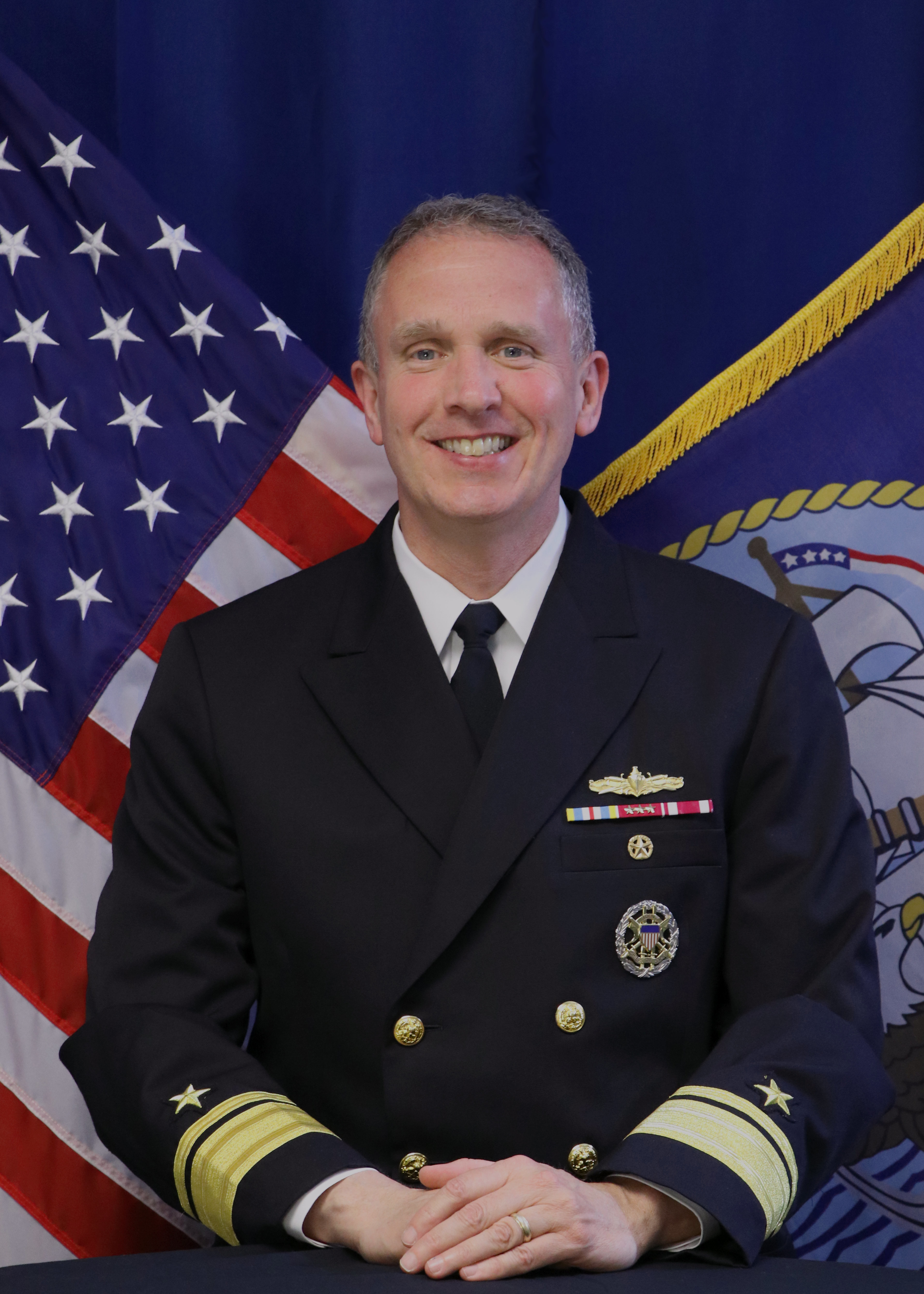
- Official portrait, 2021
- Nickname: 'lil Jimmy
- Born: 1967 (age 58–59); Pittsburgh, Pennsylvania, U.S.
- Allegiance: United States
- Branch: United States Navy
- Service years: 1989–2024
- Rank: Rear Admiral
- Commands: U.S. Naval Forces Southern Command; United States Fourth Fleet; Carrier Strike Group 3 Destroyer Squadron 60; USS Chung-Hoon (DDG 93)
- Awards: Defense Superior Service Medal; Legion of Merit (4)
- Education: Pennsylvania State University (BS); United States Naval War College (MSS)

James A. Aiken Jr. (born 1967) is a retired United States Navy rear admiral and surface warfare officer who last served as the 11th commander of the United States Naval Forces Southern Command and United States Fourth Fleet from 2021 to 2024. He previously served as the commander of Carrier Strike Group 3 from 2020 to 2021, with command tours as commodore of Destroyer Squadron 60 from 2013 to 2015, and commanding officer of the USS Chung-Hoon (DDG 93) from 2007 to 2008. He was promoted to his present rank on April 1, 2021.

A native of Pittsburgh, Aiken earned his commission via the NROTC Program at Pennsylvania State University with a bachelor's degree in political science. He also earned a master's degree in strategic studies from the United States Naval War College.

== Awards and decorations ==
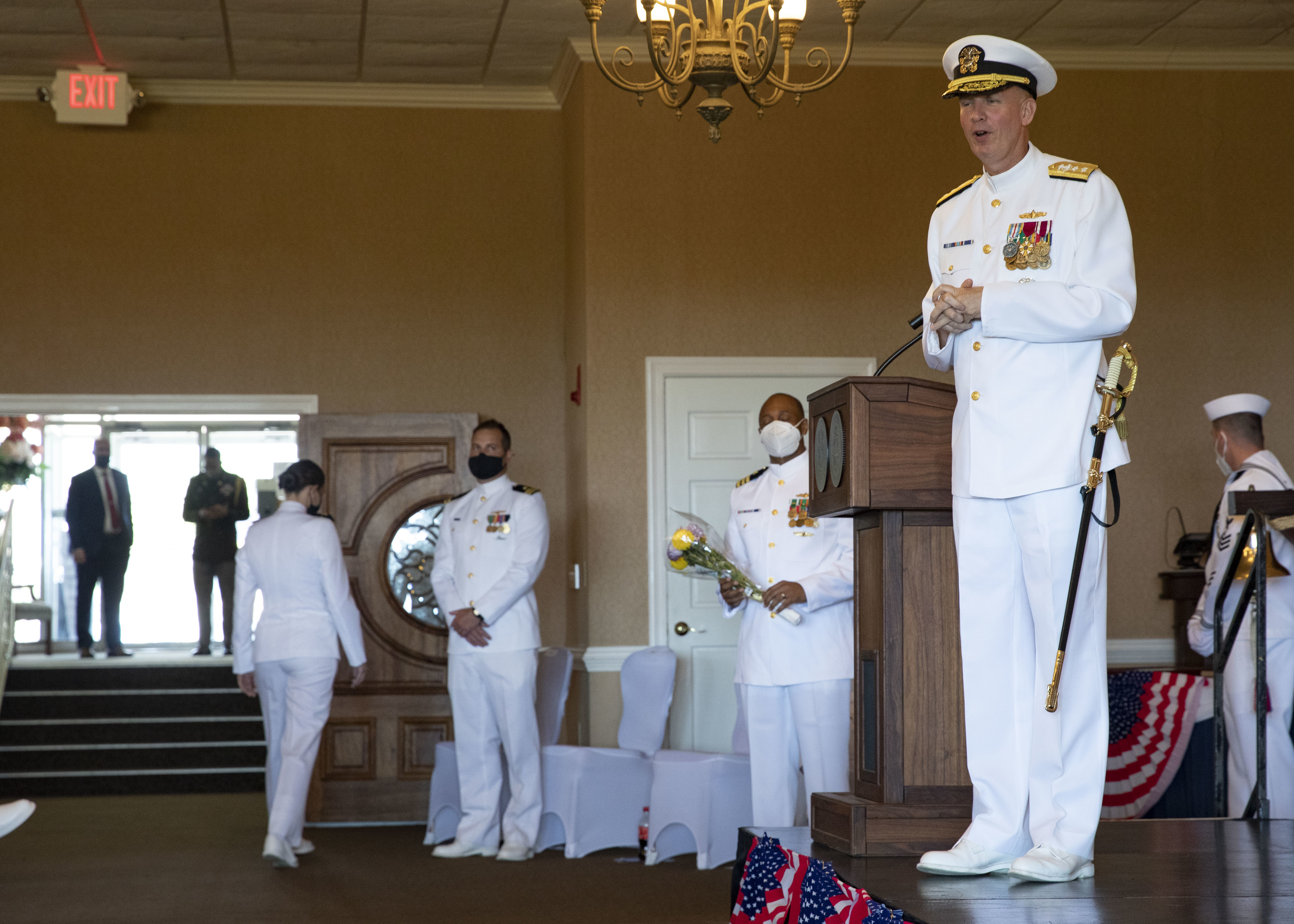
Aiken delivers remarks during the change of command ceremony for U.S. Naval Forces Southern Command/U.S. Fourth Fleet, September 3, 2021.

Surface Warfare Officer Pin
Defense Superior Service Medal	Legion of Merit with three award stars	Meritorious Service Medal
Navy and Marine Corps Commendation Medal with four award stars	Navy and Marine Corps Achievement Medal with two award stars	Joint Meritorious Unit Commendation
Navy Meritorious Unit Commendation	Navy "E" Ribbon, 2nd award	National Defense Service Medal with bronze service star
Armed Forces Expeditionary Medal	Southwest Asia Service Medal with bronze service star	Iraq Campaign Medal with bronze service star
Global War on Terrorism Expeditionary Medal	Global War on Terrorism Service Medal	Navy Sea Service Deployment Ribbon with two bronze service stars
Command at Sea insignia
Office of the Joint Chiefs of Staff Identification Badge

Military offices
Preceded by David A. Welch	Commanding Officer of USS Chung-Hoon (DDG 93); 2007–2008	Succeeded by Michael A. McCartney
Preceded by John M. Esposito	Commodore of Destroyer Squadron 60; 2013–2015	Succeeded by Richard J. Dromerhauser
Preceded by Fred I. Pyle	Commander of Carrier Strike Group 3; 2020–2021	Succeeded by Jeffrey T. Anderson
Preceded by Donald D. Gabrielson	Commander of the U.S. Naval Forces Southern Command and United States Fourth Fleet; 2021–2024	Succeeded by Carlos Sardiello
