= Brian S. Hurley =

U.S. Navy admiral

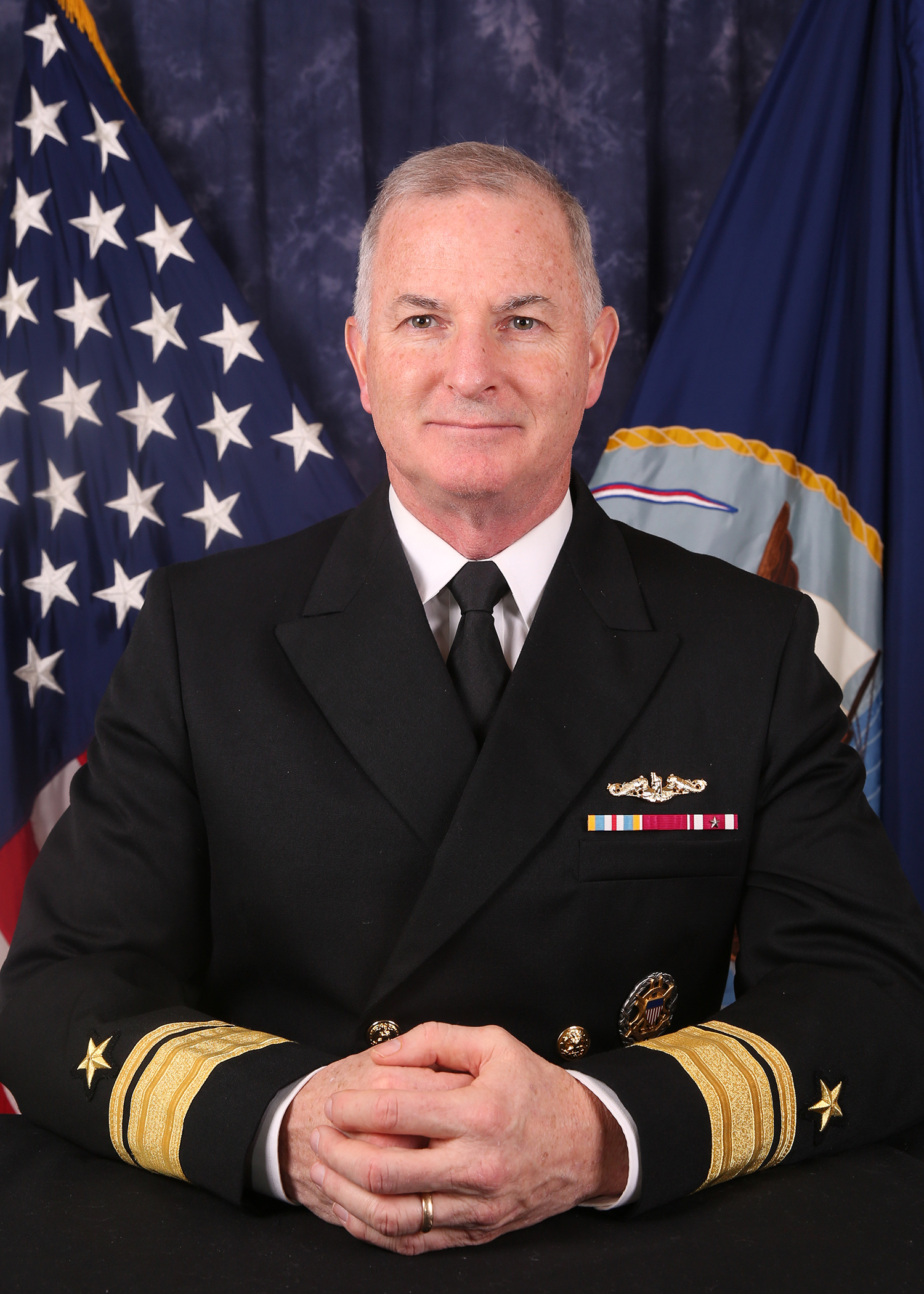
- Official portrait, 2018
- Born: 1963 (age 62–63)
- Military career
- Allegiance: United States
- Branch: United States Navy
- Service years: 1987–2023
- Rank: Rear Admiral
- Commands: Task Force 73 and Logistics Group Western Pacific

Brian Sean Hurley (born 1963) is a retired United States Navy rear admiral who last served as the Director, Joint Service Provider of the Defense Information Systems Agency from 2019 to 2022. Previously, he served as the Reserve Deputy Commander for Maritime Operations of the United States Fleet Forces Command. Raised in Galveston, Texas, Hurley earned a bachelor's degree from Texas A&M University in 1987. He transitioned to the Navy Reserve in 2000.

Military offices
Preceded by Charles Williams	Commander of Task Force 73 and Logistics Group Western Pacific; 2016	Succeeded by Donald Gabrielson
Preceded by ???	Reserve Deputy Commander of the United States Seventh Fleet; 2016–2018	Succeeded by ???
Preceded by Mark L. Leavitt	Reserve Deputy Commander for Maritime Operations of the United States Fleet Forces Command; 2018–2019	Succeeded by Andrew J. Mueller
Preceded by ???	Director, Joint Service Provider of the Defense Information Systems Agency; 2019–2023	Succeeded by ???
