= Richard B. Landolt =

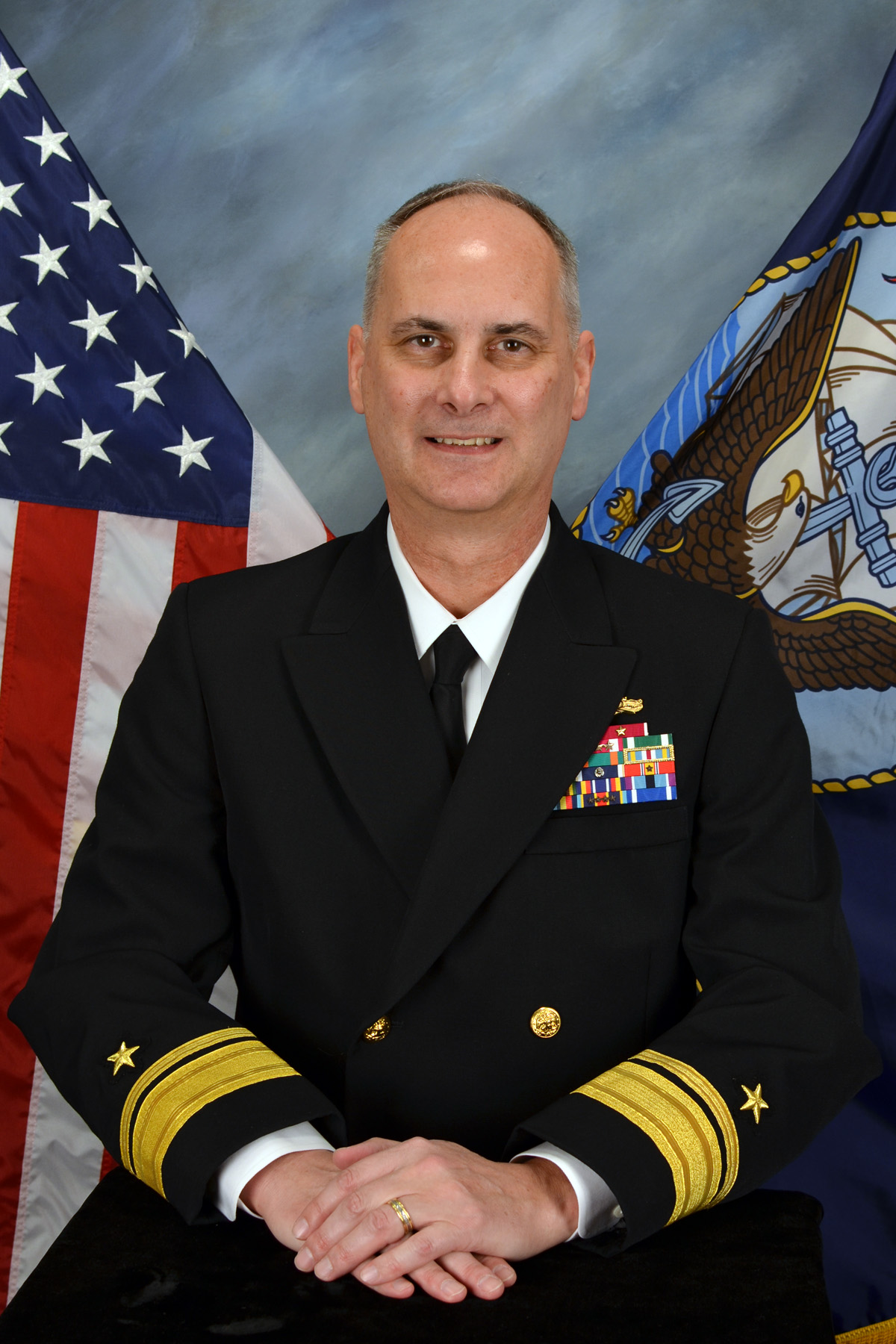
- Rear Admiral Richard Landolt in 2012
- Born: 1959 (age 66–67)
- Military career
- Allegiance: United States of America
- Branch: United States Navy
- Service years: 1981–2014
- Rank: Rear Admiral
- Nickname: Rich
- Commands: Amphibious Force 7th Fleet in Okinawa, Japan
- Conflicts: Gulf War; Operation Iraqi Freedom
- Awards: Defense Superior Service Medal; Legion of Merit; Defense Meritorious Service Medal; Meritorious Service Medal

Richard Banks "Rich" Landolt (born 1959) is a retired Rear Admiral of the United States Navy. He currently serves as the Senior Civilian Representative of the Secretary of Defense in Europe and the Defense Advisor to the U.S. Ambassador to NATO.

== Military career ==
Landolt commanded the Amphibious Force for the 7th Fleet (Task Force 76) in Okinawa, Japan.

He has served as a senior fellow on the Chief of Naval Operations Strategic Studies Group. In addition he also served as the deputy director of the Expeditionary Warfare Division for the United States Navy.

Landolt retired from the U.S. Navy in February 2014.

== Post-military career ==
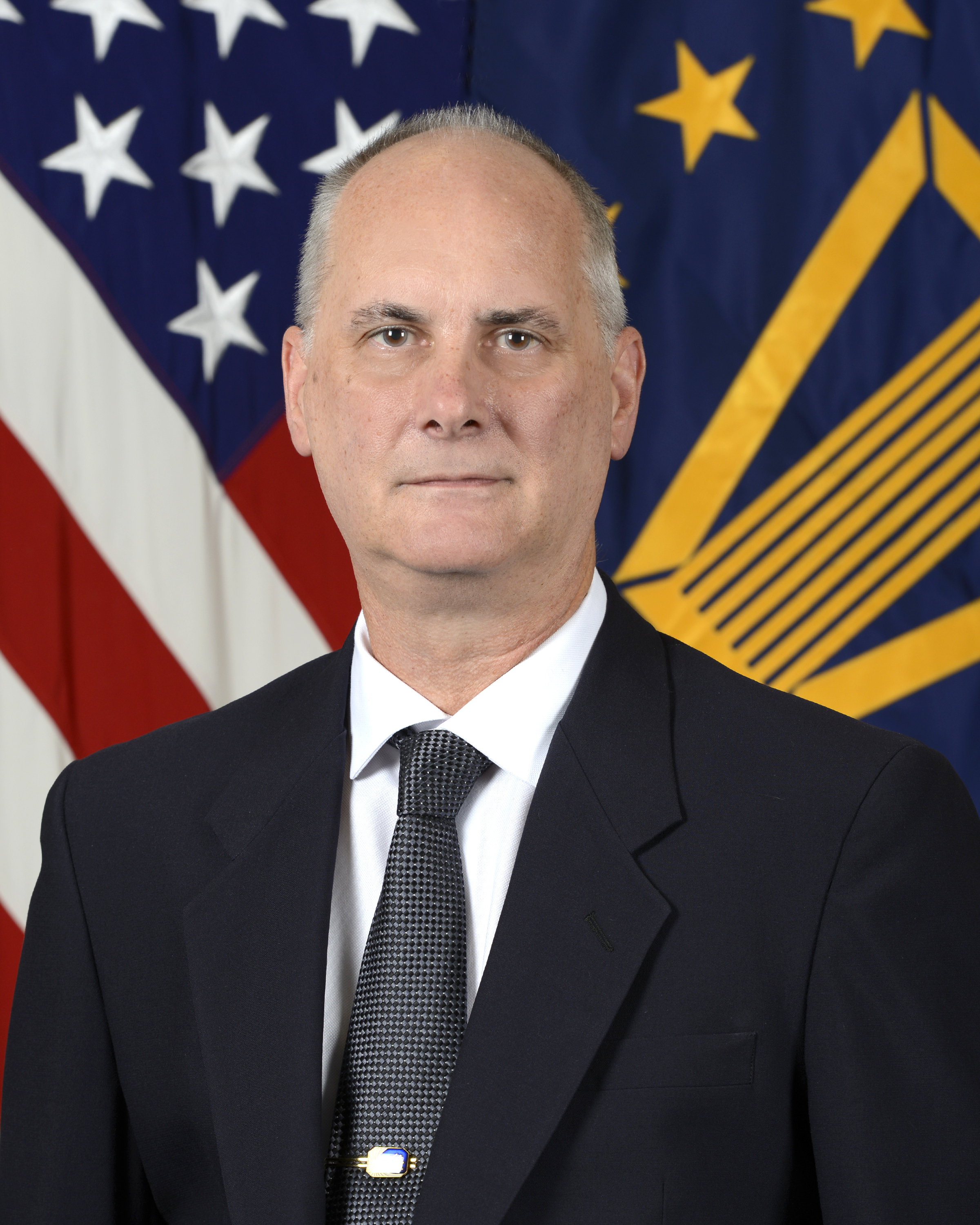
2017 U.S. Defense Department portrait

After his military retirement, Landolt served as the Executive Director of Public Safety for the city of Mobile, Alabama from July 2014 to March 2017.

In August 2017 he was appointed Senior Civilian Representative of Defense Secretary James Mattis in Europe and the Defense Advisor to Permanent Representative of the United States to the North Atlantic Treaty Organization Kay Bailey Hutchison in Brussels, Belgium.

== Education ==
- Bachelor's degree in Political Science from the University of Florida in 1981
- Master's degree in Telecommunications Systems Management from the Naval Postgraduate School in 1987
