= Marcel Lettre =

American government official (born 1972)

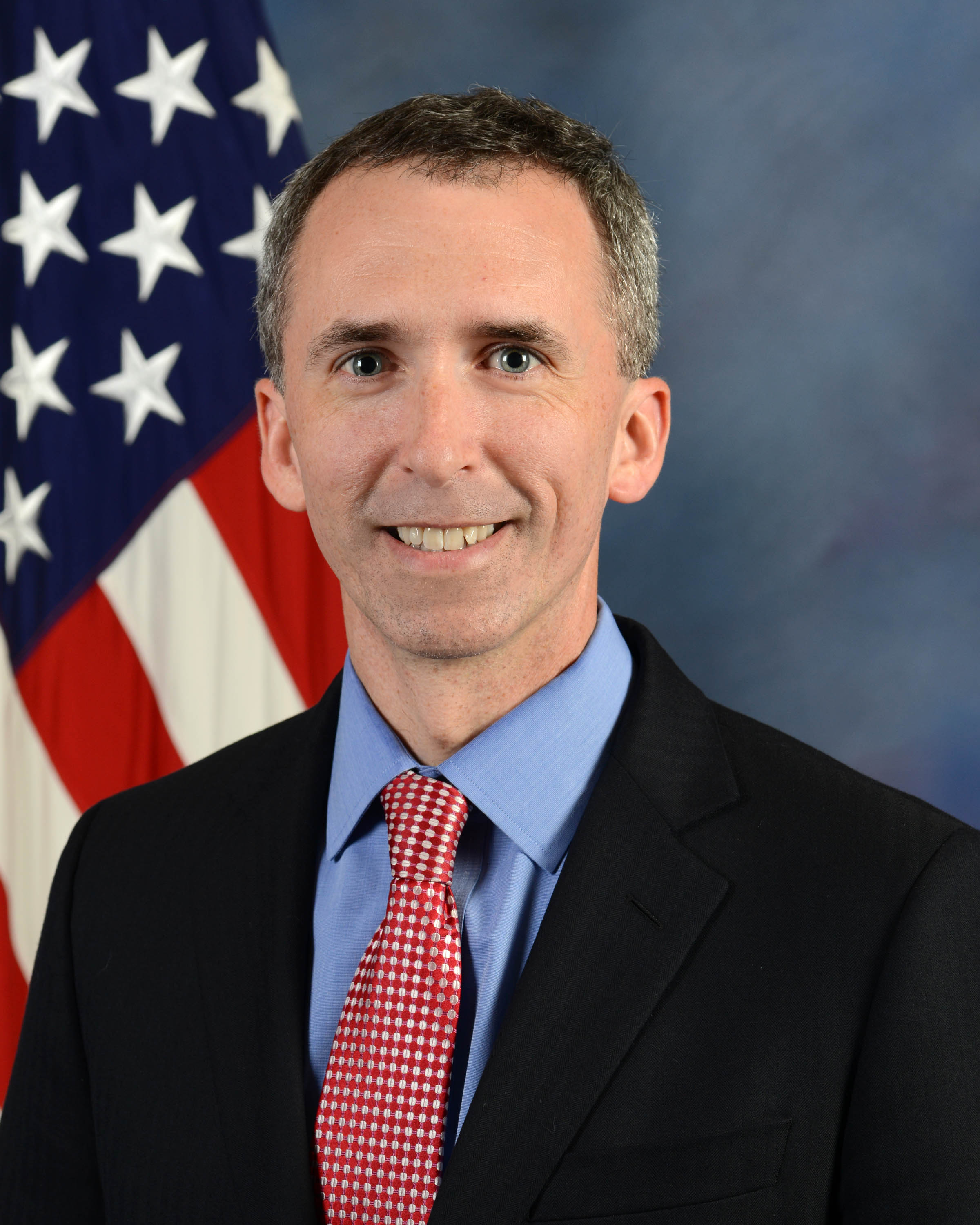

Under Secretary of Defense for Intelligence
- In office December 16, 2015 – January 20, 2017
- President: Barack Obama
- Preceded by: Michael G. Vickers
- Succeeded by: Joseph D. Kernan

Principal Deputy Under Secretary of Defense for Intelligence
- In office November 1, 2013 – December 16, 2015
- President: Barack Obama

Personal details
- Born: Marcel John Lettre, II; August 9, 1972 (age 54) Gainesville, Georgia
- Education: Sewanee: The University of the South; Harvard University's John F. Kennedy School of Government

Marcel Lettre (born August 9, 1972) is a former United States federal government official. He served as the Under Secretary of Defense for Intelligence from December 2015 to January 2017. He now works for Lockheed Martin.

== Early life ==
Born in Gainesville, Georgia, Marcel Lettre attended Terry Sanford Senior High School in Fayetteville, North Carolina, graduating in 1990. He graduated from Sewanee: The University of the South with a B.A. degree in political science in 1994. Lettre earned a M.P.P. degree from the John F. Kennedy School of Government at Harvard University in 2000.

== Career ==
From the onset of the Obama Administration, Lettre served as Principal Deputy Assistant Secretary of Defense for Legislative Affairs. In 2011, he served as a Special Assistant to Secretaries of Defense Chuck Hagel, Leon Panetta, and Bob Gates, serving as Deputy Chief of Staff to Secretary Panetta. Later, Lettre was confirmed by the Senate and held the position of Principal Deputy Under Secretary of Defense for Intelligence (PDUSDI) from October 2013 to May 2015.

Lettre was nominated as Under Secretary of Defense for Intelligence by President Barack Obama on August 5, 2015. He was confirmed by the United States Senate in December 2015, and he stepped down in January 2017.

Lettre now works for Lockheed Martin.

== Personal life ==
Lettre has two daughters.
