= Thomas Shultz =

Thomas Shultz is a Rear Admiral in the United States Navy. He is the Commander of Task Force 76.

== Career ==
Originally from El Cajon, California, Thomas Shultz was commissioned via the Naval Reserve Officers Training Corps at the University of California, Los Angeles. Additionally, he is a graduate of Occidental College and the Naval Postgraduate School.

Earlier in his career, Shultz served aboard the USS Monsoon, the USS Sides and the USS Mobile Bay, as well as with Destroyer Squadron 7. He eventually rose to be the Commanding Officer of the USS Patriot (MCM-7), the USS Michael Murphy and the USS Green Bay (LPD-20).

Shultz's additional tours have included serving as a top aide for the Commander, Naval Surface Force Atlantic, Supreme Allied Commander Europe, the United States Under Secretary of the Navy and a tour with the United States European Command. Decorations he has received include the Defense Superior Service Medal, the Legion of Merit and the Meritorious Service Medal.
