= United States Fourth Fleet =

Numbered fleet of the United States Navy

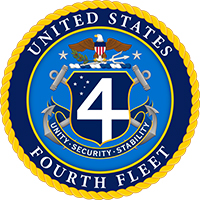
- Active: 1943–1945; 2008–present
- Country: United States of America
- Branch: United States Navy
- Type: Fleet Command
- Role: Direct Fleet Operations
- Part of: U.S. Naval Forces Southern Command; U.S. Southern Command (USSOUTHCOM)
- Garrison/HQ: Naval Station Mayport

Commanders
- Current commander: Rear Admiral Carlos A. Sardiello

The U.S. Fourth Fleet is a United States Navy numbered fleet. It is the Naval Component Command of U.S. Southern Command (USSOUTHCOM). The Fourth Fleet is headquartered at Naval Station Mayport in Jacksonville, Florida. It is responsible for U.S. Navy ships, aircraft and submarines operating in the Caribbean Sea, and the Atlantic and Pacific Oceans around Central and South America.

== History ==
=== World War II ===
The 4th Fleet was a major U.S. Navy formation in the South Atlantic Ocean during World War II. It was originally established to protect the U.S. against Axis surface raiders, blockade runners, and submarines.

The Fleet was originally a redesignation of the South Atlantic Force. On 12 September 1942, the Brazilian Navy was placed under command of the U.S. Navy's Vice Admiral Jonas Ingram by order of the Brazilian President Vargas. Three days later, on 15 September 1942, Vice Admiral Ingram was appointed as Commander, South Atlantic Force (ComSoLant). Six months later, South Atlantic Force was redesignated the U.S. Fourth Fleet on 15 March 1943.

The Fleet worked with Brazil in the South Atlantic using Atlantic Ocean bases at Recife and elsewhere.

The fleet was later commanded by Vice Admiral William Munroe. In all, forces deployed to the 4th Fleet sank 18 German U-boats and one Italian submarine, along with sinking or stopping Axis blockade runners.

Three years after its establishment, on 15 April 1945, the Fourth Fleet was dissolved and renamed Task Force 27. Admiral Munroe kept the title and command of Commander, South Atlantic Force. In 1946, the U.S. 4th Reserve Fleet was formed to maintain readiness for war; it was disestablished on 1 January 1947.

=== 2008 reactivation ===
On 24 April 2008, Chief of Naval Operations Admiral Gary Roughead announced the reestablishment of the Fourth Fleet. Its formal reestablishment took place on 12 July 2008 at a ceremony at Naval Station Mayport, Florida.

The announcement was made before informing foreign governments in the region, several of which expressed concern. The governments of Argentina and Brazil made formal inquiries as to the fleet's mission in the region. In Venezuela, President Hugo Chávez accused the United States of attempting to frighten the people of Latin America and vowed that his country's new Sukhoi Su-30 jets could sink any U.S. ships invading Venezuelan waters. Cuban president Fidel Castro warned that it could lead to more incidents such as the 2008 Andean diplomatic crisis.

== Mission ==
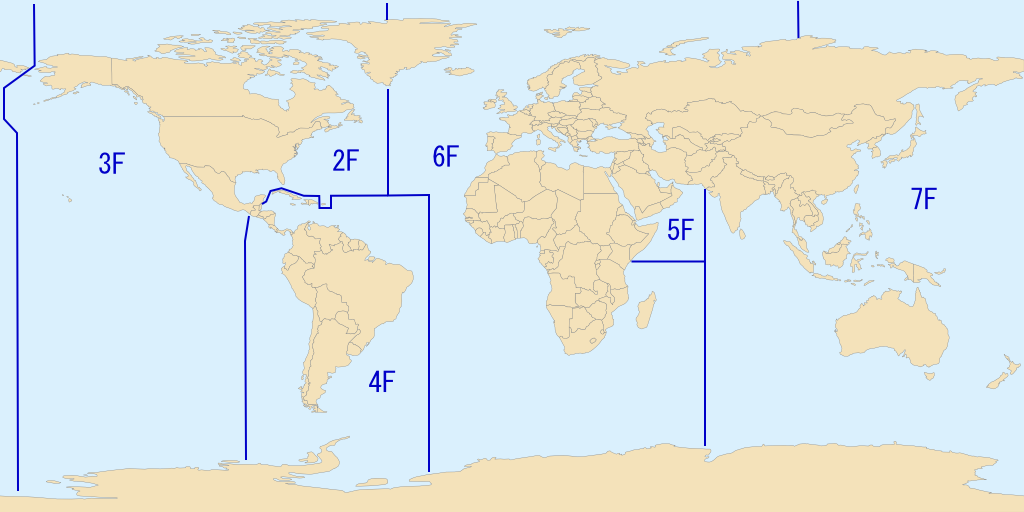
The Fourth Fleet's area of responsibility, 2009.

U.S. Naval Forces Southern Command (USNAVSO) and the Fourth Fleet support USSOUTHCOM joint and combined full-spectrum military operations. They do this by providing principally sea-based forward presence to ensure freedom of maneuver in the maritime domain, to foster and sustain cooperative relationships with international partners, and to fully exploit the sea as maneuver space in order to enhance regional security and promote peace, stability, and prosperity in the Caribbean, Central American, and South American regions. The Fleet has five missions: support for peacekeeping, humanitarian assistance, disaster relief, traditional maritime exercises, and counterdrug support operations.

== Organization ==
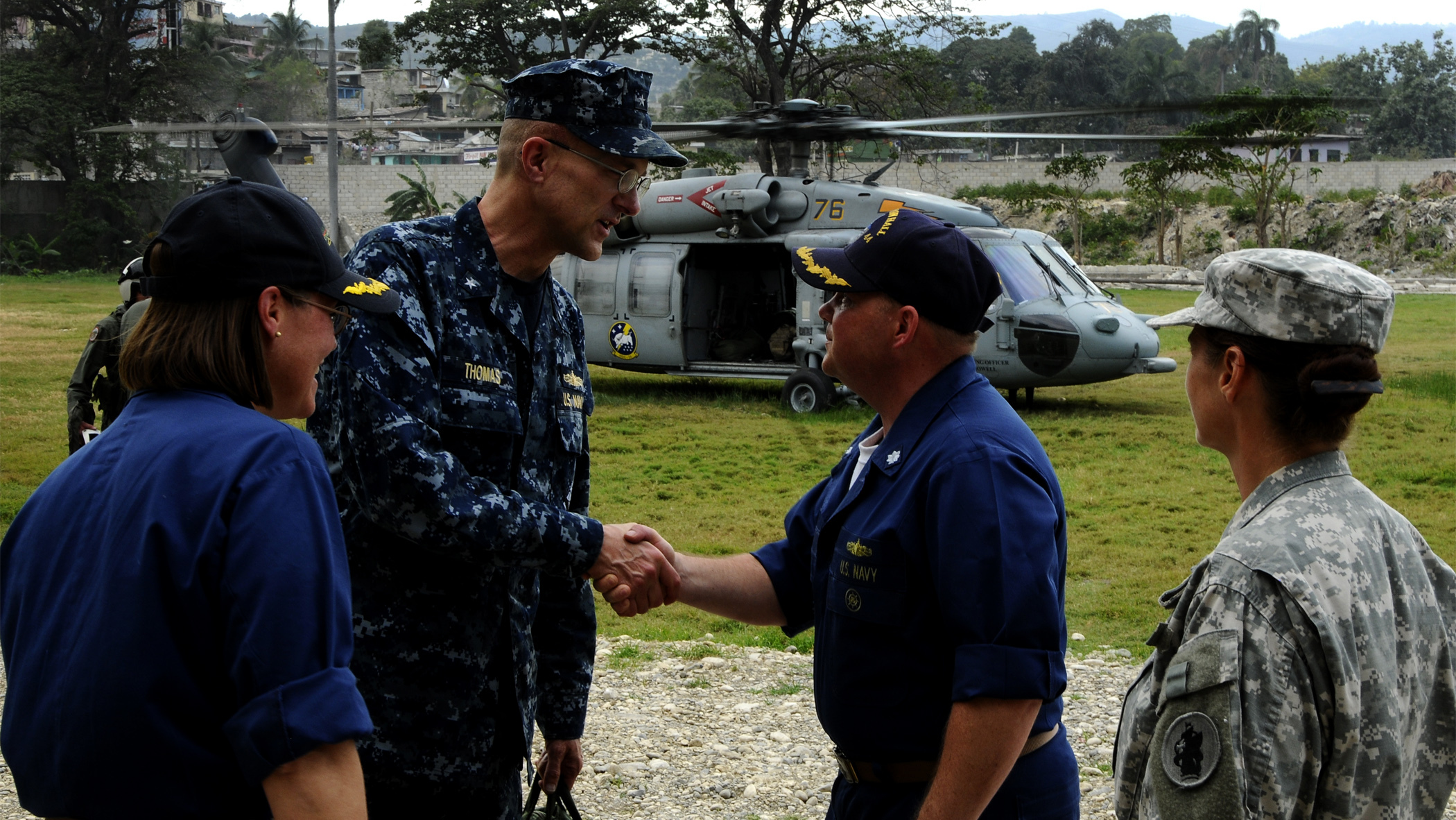
Commander, Task Force 41, Rear Admiral Thomas, shakes hands with Commanding Officer, USS Gunston Hall, in Haiti, on 5 February 2010. Fourth Fleet units were deployed to assist after the earthquake there.

Commander, USNAVSO (COMUSNAVSO) also serves as the Navy component commander for USSOUTHCOM. U.S. Fourth Fleet is responsible for U.S. Navy ships, aircraft and submarines operating in the USSOUTHCOM area of responsibility, which encompasses the Caribbean, Central America, South America, and surrounding waters. It is an organizational fleet staffed to fulfill a planning and coordination mission; as part of its 2008 reestablishment, no vessels are permanently assigned to the Fourth Fleet. Ships home-ported in the United States Fleet Forces Command and United States Third Fleet routinely deploy to the Fourth Fleet area of responsibility (AOR), during which time they are under the operational control of the Fourth Fleet commander.

Fourth Fleet headquarters is co-located with USNAVSO headquarters in Naval Station Mayport, Florida, and is commanded by a two-star rear admiral.

== Fourth Fleet Commanders ==
- Vice Admiral Jonas H. Ingram (September 1942 – 11 November 1944)
- Vice Admiral William R. Munroe (11 November 1944 – 15 April 1945)
- Vice Admiral Thomas R. Cooley (1945 – mid 1946)
- Vice Admiral Daniel E. Barbey (September 1946 – March 1947)
- Vice Admiral Charles McMorris (mid-1947 – July 1948)
- Rear Admiral Joseph D. Kernan (1 July 2008 – 12 June 2009)
- Rear Admiral Victor G. Guillory (12 June 2009 – 5 August 2011)
- Rear Admiral Kurt W. Tidd (5 August 2011 – 22 June 2012)
- Rear Admiral Sinclair M. Harris (22 June 2012 – 17 April 2014)
- Rear Admiral George W. Ballance (17 April 2014 – 12 August 2016)
- Rear Admiral Sean Buck (12 August 2016 – 21 May 2019)
- Rear Admiral Donald D. Gabrielson (21 May 2019 – 3 September 2021)
- Rear Admiral James A. Aiken (3 September 2021 – July 2024)
- Rear Admiral Carlos A. Sardiello (July 2024 – present)

== See also ==
- United States Fleet Forces Command
- United States Second Fleet
- United States Third Fleet
- United States Fifth Fleet
- United States Sixth Fleet
- United States Seventh Fleet
- United States Tenth Fleet
- United States Naval Support Detachment, São Paulo
