= Sean Buck =

American Navy admiral

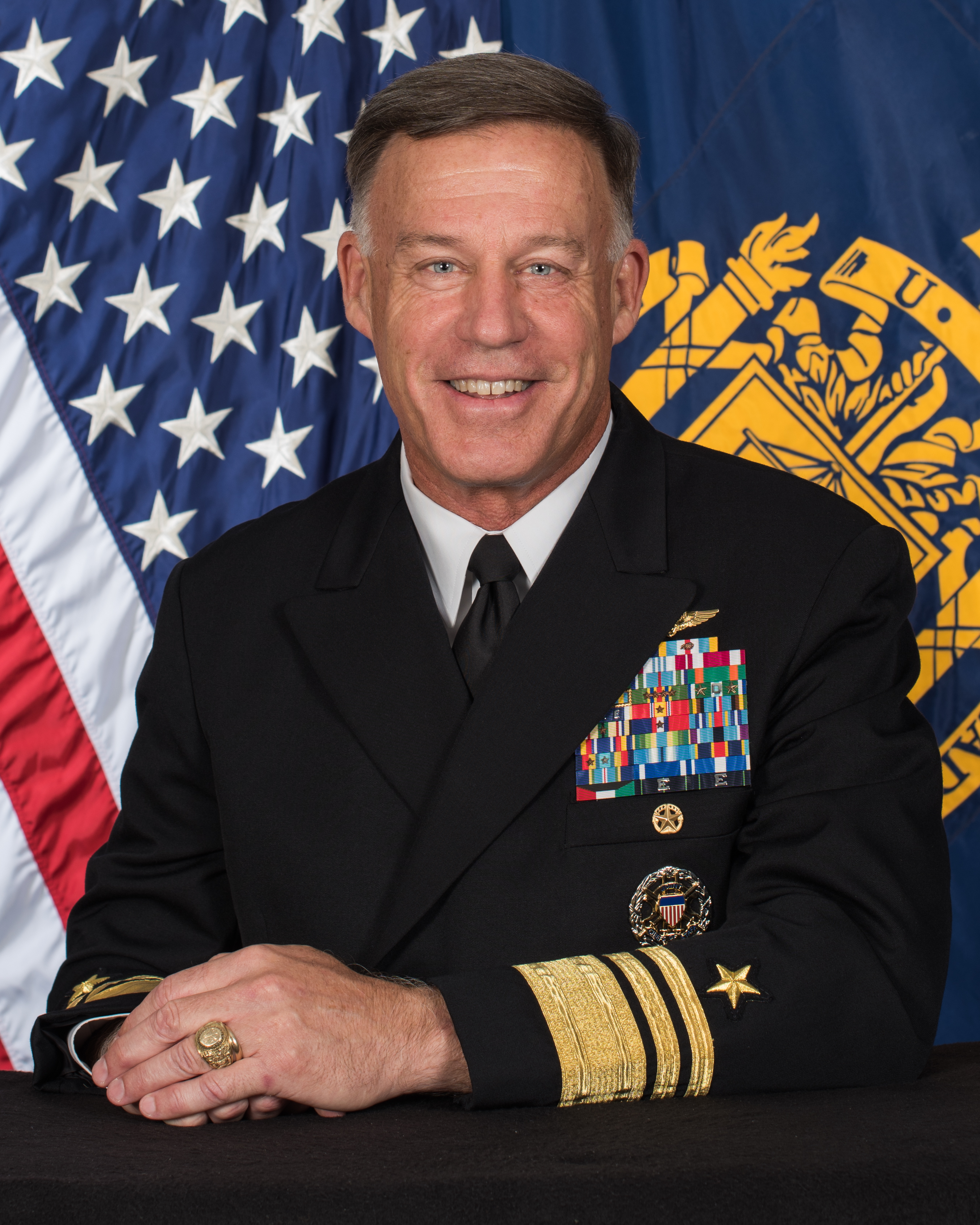
- Buck in 2019

63rd Superintendent of the United States Naval Academy
- In office July 26, 2019 – August 27, 2023
- Preceded by: Walter E. Carter Jr.
- Succeeded by: Frederick W. Kacher (acting); Yvette M. Davids

Personal details
- Born: 1960 (age 65–66) Indianapolis, Indiana, U.S.
- Military career
- Education: United States Naval Academy (BS); George Washington University (MA)
- Allegiance: United States
- Branch: United States Navy
- Service years: 1983–2023
- Rank: Vice Admiral
- Commands: United States Naval Academy; United States Naval Forces Southern Command; United States Fourth Fleet; Patrol and Reconnaissance Wing 11; VP-26
- Conflicts: Gulf War
- Awards: Navy Distinguished Service Medal; Defense Superior Service Medal (2); Legion of Merit (5)

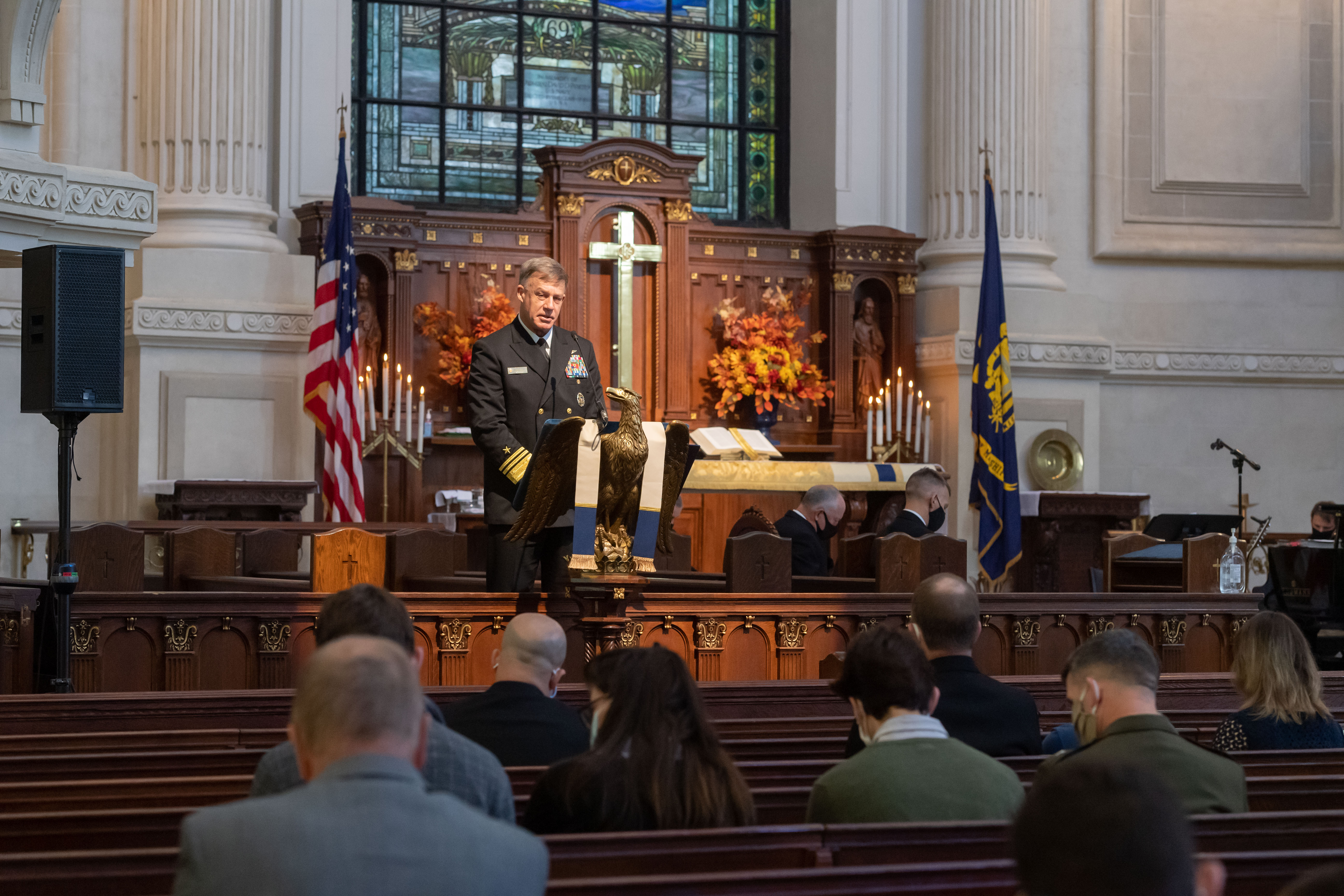
Vice Admiral Buck in the Naval Academy Chapel

Sean Scott Buck (born 1960) is a retired vice admiral in the United States Navy who served as the Superintendent of the United States Naval Academy from July 26, 2019, to August 27, 2023.

== Early life and education ==
Buck is a native of Indianapolis where he attended North Central High School, graduating in 1979. He is a graduate of the United States Naval Academy and received his commission in 1983. He earned a Master of Arts in international security policy from George Washington University and has completed studies at the Naval War College and the Joint Forces Staff College. He also completed a fellowship at MIT Seminar XXI: Foreign Politics, International Relations, and the National Interest; and executive certificate programs at both the Harvard Kennedy School and the Harvard Graduate School of Education.

== Naval career ==
Buck was designated a Naval Flight Officer in 1985.

As a flag officer, Buck has served as commander, Patrol and Reconnaissance Force with U.S. 5th and 7th Fleets, Fleet Air Forward, Patrol and Reconnaissance Group; chief of staff, Strategy, Plans and Policy (J5), the Joint Staff; Director, 21st Century Sailor Office, where his portfolio included the Navy's programs on sexual assault prevention and response, suicide prevention, alcohol abuse, and other destructive behaviors; and most recently he served as commander, U.S. Naval Forces Southern Command/U.S. 4th Fleet.

Flying the P-3C Orion, Buck's early at-sea operational tours were with the "Fighting Marlins" of Patrol Squadron (VP) 40; a disassociated sea tour aboard USS Theodore Roosevelt (CVN 71) as the catapult and arresting gear division officer; and a department head tour with the "Tridents" of VP-26. He subsequently commanded VP-26 and Patrol and Reconnaissance Wing 11.

Buck's shore and staff assignments include Air Test and Evaluation Squadron (VX) 1; Bureau of Naval Personnel; Joint Staff J3; Office of the Chief of Naval Operations staff as executive assistant to the deputy chief of Naval Operations (CNO) for Warfare Requirements and Programs (N6/N7); and as the deputy director for operations in the Strategy and Policy Directorate (J5), U.S. Joint Forces Command. Prior to major command, Buck completed an interim assignment with the National Reconnaissance Office; he is a member of the Navy's Space Cadre.

Buck also completed a special assignment as a senior fellow on the CNO's Strategic Studies Group in Newport, Rhode Island, an innovation think tank for the Navy. Buck became the 63rd superintendent of the U.S. Naval Academy on July 26, 2019. He retired from the Navy on July 7, 2023, relinquishing his office to Rear Admiral Fred Kacher.

Buck's personal awards include the Navy Distinguished Service Medal, Defense Superior Service Medal (two awards), Legion of Merit (five awards) and various other personal, unit and service awards.

Military offices
Preceded by George W. Ballance	Commander of the United States Fourth Fleet; 2016–2019	Succeeded by Donald D. Gabrielson
Preceded by Walter E. Carter Jr.	63rd Superintendent of the United States Naval Academy; 2019–2023	Succeeded by Frederick W. Kacher; Acting
