= Bradley Hansell =

US government official

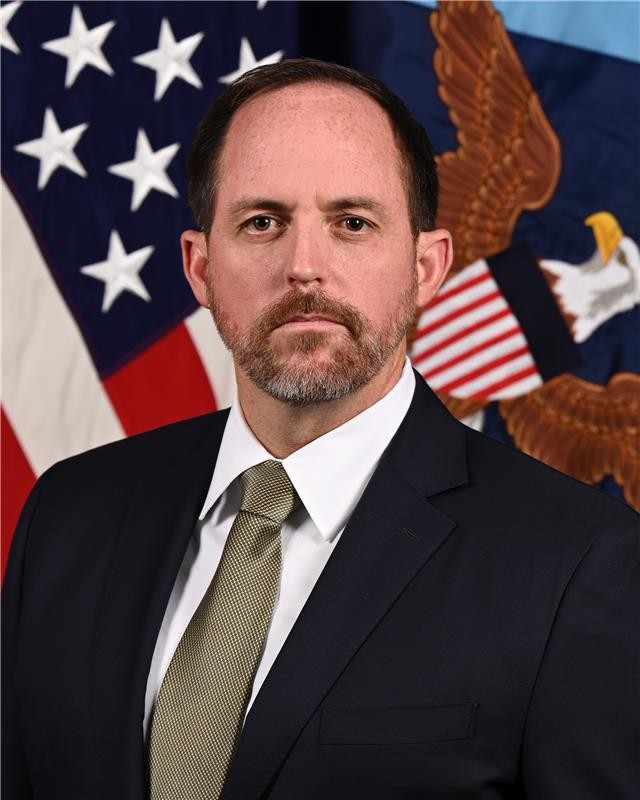

Under Secretary of Defense for Intelligence and Security
- Incumbent
- Assumed office July 25, 2025
- President: Donald Trump
- Preceded by: Ronald Moultrie

Personal details
- Education: Villanova University (BA); University of Virginia Darden School of Business (MBA)

Military service
- Branch/service: United States Navy; United States Army

Bradley Hansell serves as the Under Secretary of Defense for Intelligence in the second Trump administration. His term began July 25, 2025, shortly after he was confirmed by the Senate on July 22 of the same year.

== Education ==
Hansell earned a Bachelor of Arts degree from the Villanova University and a Master of Business Administration from the University of Virginia Darden School of Business where he was awarded a Pat Tillman Foundation scholarship.

== Career ==
Hansell served as an officer in the United States Navy and the United States Army. During his service he was decorated with the Bronze Star Medal, the Purple Heart, and the Meritorious Service Medal. After his military service, he worked at Boston Consulting Group.

During the first Trump administration he served as a Special Assistant to the President and Senior Director on the staff of the United States National Security Council. He was nominated by the President to be Deputy Under Secretary of Defense for Intelligence and Security following Kathryn Wheelberger's resignation in 2020.

Following his position in the White House, he worked in the venture capital industry, including roles at Windage Partners and Outlander VC.

Hansell was confirmed as Under Secretary of Defense for Intelligence in July 2025.
