= United States Naval Support Detachment, São Paulo =

The US Naval Support Detachment, São Paulo was a US Marine Corps Detachment based in the city of São Paulo, Brazil and the only American military detachment in Brazil. The military unit belonged to the jurisdiction of the US Navy Fourth Fleet, responsible for the South Atlantic and Caribbean region, which was reactivated on July 1, 2008.

On July 4, 2011, in an event organized by the US Consulate General in São Paulo aiming at celebrating the 235th anniversary of the Independence Day, the US Naval Support Detachment in São Paulo presented the flags to the guests, who included many Brazilian authorities, among which São Paulo Mayor, Gilberto Kassab, and Brazilian Senator Eduardo Suplicy.

The detachment was closed in 2017, at the request of the Brazilian government.

== See also ==
- United States Marine Corps
- List of United States military bases
