= Donald Gabrielson =

Retired U.S. Navy admiral

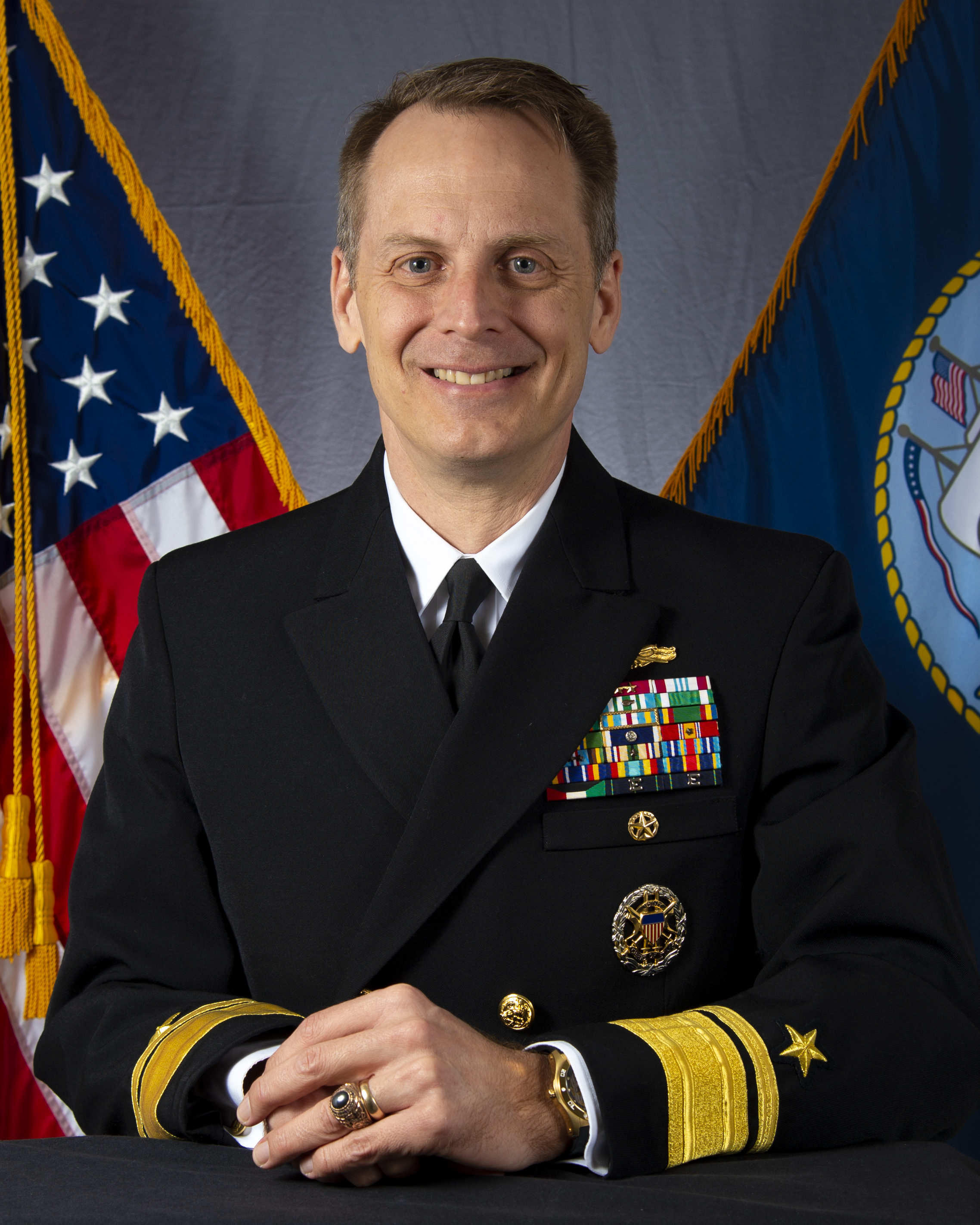
- Official portrait, 2019
- Born: 1966 (age 59–60)
- Education: United States Naval Academy (BS); Naval Postgraduate School (MS)
- Military career
- Allegiance: United States
- Branch: United States Navy
- Service years: 1989–2021
- Rank: Rear Admiral
- Nickname: Don
- Commands: United States Naval Forces Southern Command; United States Fourth Fleet; Carrier Strike Group 11; Task Force 73; USS Cape St. George (CG-71); USS Freedom (LCS-1)
- Conflicts: Gulf War
- Awards: Navy Distinguished Service Medal; Defense Superior Service Medal; Legion of Merit (3)

Donald Dean Gabrielson (born 1966) is a retired United States Navy rear admiral and surface warfare officer who last served as the 10th commander of the United States Naval Forces Southern Command and United States Fourth Fleet from May 21, 2019 to September 3, 2021.

== History ==
Previously, he served as the commander of Carrier Strike Group 11 from June 2018 to May 2019, with tours as commander of Task Force 73 and Logistics Group Western Pacific from August 2016 to June 2018, 12th commander of USS Cape St. George (CG-71) from May 2011 to February 2013, as well as being the first commanding officer of USS Freedom (LCS-1) from September 2006 to March 2009. He was promoted to rear admiral effective August 1, 2019.

== Education ==
A native of Minnesota, Gabrielson graduated from the United States Naval Academy with a Bachelor of Science degree in 1989, and earned a Master of Science degree in operations research from the Naval Postgraduate School in 1995, and a master's degree from the National War College in 2005.

== Awards and decorations ==

Surface Warfare Officer Pin
Navy Distinguished Service Medal
| Defense Superior Service Medal | Legion of Merit with two award stars | Defense Meritorious Service Medal |
| Meritorious Service Medal with three award stars | Joint Service Commendation Medal with bronze oak leaf cluster | Navy and Marine Corps Commendation Medal |
| Navy and Marine Corps Achievement Medal | Joint Meritorious Unit Commendation | Navy Unit Commendation |
| Navy Meritorious Unit Commendation with two bronze service stars | Navy "E" Ribbon, 4th award | National Defense Service Medal with bronze service star |
| Armed Forces Expeditionary Medal with two bronze service stars | Southwest Asia Service Medal with bronze service star | Global War on Terrorism Expeditionary Medal |
| Global War on Terrorism Service Medal | Navy Sea Service Deployment Ribbon with silver service star | Navy and Marine Corps Overseas Service Ribbon |
| Kuwait Liberation Medal (Kuwait) | Navy Expert Rifleman Medal | Navy Expert Pistol Shot Medal |
Command at Sea insignia
Office of the Joint Chiefs of Staff Identification Badge

Military offices
| New command | Commanding Officer of USS Freedom (LCS-1); 2006–2009 | Succeeded by Kristy D. Doyle |
| Preceded by William D. Byrne Jr. | Commanding Officer of USS Cape St. George (CG-71); 2011–2013 | Succeeded by Michael P. Doran |
| Preceded by Brian S. Hurley | Commander of Task Force 73 and Logistics Group Western Pacific; 2016–2018 | Succeeded by Murray Tynch III |
| Preceded by Gregory N. Harris | Commander of Carrier Strike Group 11; 2018–2019 | Succeeded by Yvette M. Davids |
| Preceded by Sean S. Buck | Commander of the U.S. Naval Forces Southern Command and United States Fourth Fleet; 2019–2021 | Succeeded by James A. Aiken Jr. |
