= Under Secretary of Defense for Intelligence and Security =

Position in the US Department of Defense

United States Under Secretary of Defense for Intelligence and Security
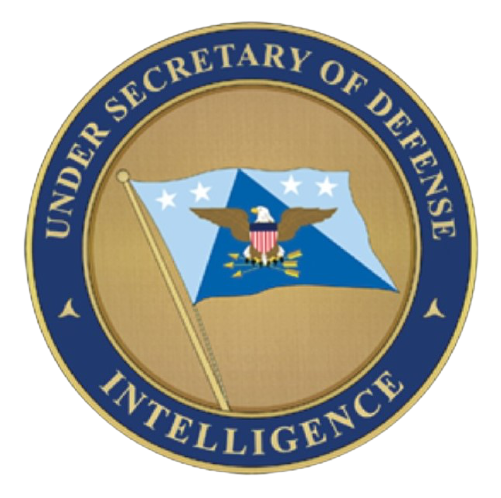
- Seal of the Under Secretary of Defense for Intelligence and Security

- Flag of an Under Secretary of Defense

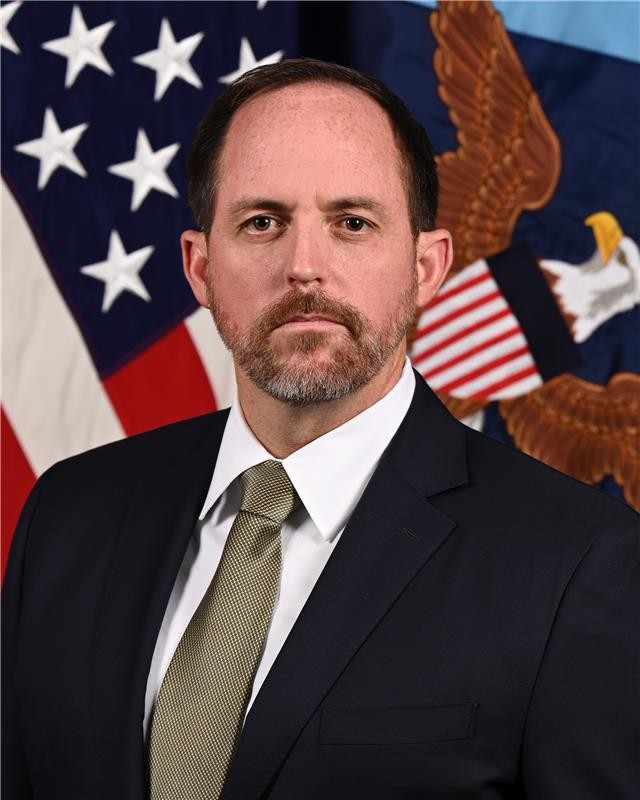
- Incumbent; Bradley Hansell since 25 July 2025
- United States Department of Defense; Office of the Secretary of Defense
- Style: Mister Under Secretary
- Reports to: Secretary of Defense; Deputy Secretary of Defense
- Nominator: Secretary of Defense
- Appointer: President of the United States; with Senate advice and consent
- Term length: At the pleasure of the President
- Formation: 11 March 2003
- First holder: Stephen Cambone
- Succession: Fourth in Secretary of Defense succession
- Deputy: Deputy Under Secretary of Defense for Intelligence and Security
- Salary: Executive Schedule, Level III
- Website: ousdi.defense.gov

The under secretary of defense for intelligence and security or USD(I&S) is a high-ranking civilian position in the Office of the Secretary of Defense (OSD) within the U.S. Department of Defense (DoD) that acts as the principal civilian advisor and deputy to the secretary of defense (SecDef) and deputy secretary of defense (DepSecDef) on matters relating to military intelligence and security. The under secretary is appointed as a civilian by the president and confirmed by the Senate to serve at the pleasure of the president.

In 2019, Congress renamed the office from Under Secretary of Defense for Intelligence (USD(I)) to Under Secretary of Defense for Intelligence and Security as part of the FY2020 National Defense Authorization Act.

== Overview ==
The Office of the Under Secretary of Defense for Intelligence and Security (OUSD(I&S)) is the principal staff element of the DoD for all matters regarding intelligence, counterintelligence, security, sensitive activities, and other intelligence- and security-related matters. As the SecDef's representative, the USD(I&S) exercises oversight over, among others, the Defense Intelligence Agency (DIA), the National Geospatial-Intelligence Agency (NGA), the National Reconnaissance Office (NRO), the National Security Agency (NSA), and the Defense Counterintelligence and Security Agency (DCSA). In addition, the under secretary is also dual-hatted, serving as the Director of Defense Intelligence (DDI) under the Office of the Director of National Intelligence (ODNI); in this capacity, the under secretary is the principal defense intelligence and security advisor to the Director of National Intelligence (DNI). With the rank of under secretary, the USD(I&S) is a Defense Intelligence Senior Executive Service (DISES) Level III position within the Executive Schedule. Since January 2024, the annual rate of pay for Level III is $204,000.

== History ==
The position of Under Secretary of Defense for Intelligence was originally created by the National Defense Authorization Act for Fiscal Year 2003 in the aftermath of the September 11 terror attacks to better coordinate Department-wide intelligence and security activities. It also became second in the line of succession for the secretary of defense, after the deputy secretary of defense, following an executive order by President George W. Bush on 22 December 2005. When it was created, the legislation described it as taking precedence in the Department behind the under secretary for personnel and readiness (USD (P&R)).

On 23 November 2005, a DoD directive was made by SecDef Donald Rumsfeld that stated that the under secretary shall serve as the secretary's primary representative to the ODNI. It also stated the under secretary shall provide policy and oversight on the training and career development of personnel in the DoD's counterterrorism, intelligence, and security components. The under secretary has the duty of finding candidates to be nominated to serve as directors of the DIA, NGA, NRO, NSA, and DCSA, and directly overseeing their performance.

The additional position of the USD(I&S) acting in the capacity of Director of Defense Intelligence as the primary military intelligence and security advisor to the DNI follows a May 2007 memorandum of agreement between SecDef Robert Gates and DNI John Michael McConnell to create the position. In 2006, the incoming Gates eschewed the idea of "off-line intelligence organizations or analytical groups".

== Reporting officials ==
Officials reporting to the USD(I&S) include:

Directors for Defense Intelligence (DDI):

- Director for Defense Intelligence (Operational Support and International Partnerships (OSIP), formerly Warfighter Support)
- Director for Defense Intelligence (Counterintelligence, Law Enforcement and Security)
- Director for Defense Intelligence (Sensitive Activities and Special Programs)
- Director for Defense Intelligence (Programs, Resources, and Enterprise Management)

Others:

- Director of the DIA
- Director of the NGA
- Director of the NSA / Central Security Service (Note: Does not report the to under secretary in their capacity as Combatant Commander of Cyber Command)
- Director of the NRO
- Director of the DCSA

== Office of the Under Secretary ==
The under secretary heads the Office of the Under Secretary of Defense for Intelligence and Security (OUSD(I&S)). A unit of the OSD, OUSD(I&S) exercises planning, policy, and strategic oversight over all DoD intelligence, counterintelligence, and security matters. OUSD(I&S) serves as the primary representative of the Defense Department to the DNI and other members of the United States Intelligence Community.

The work of OUSD(I&S) is conducted through its several staff directorates, including:

- Under the direction of the deputy under secretary for joint coalition warfighter support
  - Information Operations (IO) and Strategic Studies Directorate – Advisor for DoD Cyber, IO integration and IO-enabling strategic activities
  - Warfighter Requirements and Evaluation Directorate – Provides guidance and oversight to sustain the Intelligence Planning process to synchronize and integrate national and Defense Intelligence Enterprise efforts in support of selected combatant command top priority contingency and campaign plans
  - Policy, Strategy, and Doctrine Directorate – Provides oversight, development, and management of Defense Intelligence, Counterintelligence, security and intelligence-related policy, strategy, and doctrine, and establishes priorities to ensure conformance with SecDef and DNI guidance
  - Information Sharing and Partner Engagement Directorate – Coordinates all intelligence information sharing and related Warfighter intelligence support issues for the under secretary
  - Intelligence, Surveillance and Reconnaissance (ISR) Directorate – Responsible for operationalizing approved ISR initiatives. Provides ISR capability with supporting infrastructure for collection, communications and processing, exploitation and dissemination in support of commands engaged in combat operations
- Under the direction of the deputy under secretary of defense for technical collection and analysis
  - Analytic Concepts and Strategies Directorate – Stimulates, develops and implements advanced concepts, responsive strategies, and cutting-edge analytic tradecraft methodologies, techniques and procedures that focus on improving the full spectrum of analysis and maximizing the integration and collaboration between technical analysis and all-source analysis
  - Collection Concepts and Strategies Directorate – Stimulates, develops and implements advanced concepts, responsive strategies, and cutting-edge integration methodologies, techniques and procedures
  - Special Capabilities Directorate – Develops, oversees, and manages special activities addressing critical intelligence needs, operational shortfalls, and interagency requirements
- Under the direction of the deputy under secretary of defense for portfolio, programs and resources
  - Battlespace Awareness (BA) Portfolio Directorate – Serves as the principal staff advisor and functional manager for the Department's BA Portfolio
  - Intelligence, Surveillance and Reconnaissance Programs Directorate – Provides functional oversight for DoD ISR programs, to include processing, exploitation, and dedicated communications networks
  - Military Intelligence Program Resources Directorate – Develops investment strategies addressing Warfighter near-term and long-term ISR and other intelligence-related needs
- Under the direction of the deputy under secretary of defense for HUMINT, counterintelligence and security
  - Counterintelligence Directorate – Staff advisor for Department Counterintelligence and Credibility Assessment matters
  - HUMINT Directorate – Staff advisor for Department HUMINT, overseeing the full spectrum of Department HUMINT plans, programs, and operations, to include Identity Intelligence biometrics
  - Security Directorate – Staff advisor for Department security policy, planning, and oversight, and Executive Agent for the National Industrial Security Program
  - Sensitive Activities Directorate – Staff office concerning Department Sensitive Activities, National programs, Defense Sensitive Support and sensitive Special Operations
  - Direct Report Offices – Central administrative activity of the OUSD-I for legislative affairs, human capital, management, and policy oversight

== Budget ==
=== Budget totals ===
The annual budget for the USD(I&S) is contained in the Office of the Secretary of Defense's (OSD) budget, under the Defense-Wide Operation and Maintenance (O&M) account.

USD Intelligence Budget, FY 10–12 ($ in thousands)
Line item	FY10 actual	FY11 estimate	FY12 request
Core OSD Operating Program
Civilian Pay and Benefits, USD (I)	32,516	38,406	32,891
Program Structure
Intelligence Mission	55,461	85,796	74,315
International Intelligence Technology	11,519	80,643	80,548
Defense Civilian Intelligence Personnel System	4,198	2,392	2,047
Joint Military Deception Initiative	2,840	3,064	4,458
Travel	1,458	1,750	1,571
Overseas Contingency Operations
OCO OUSD (Intel)	57,849	0	0
Totals
Total budget	165,841	212,051	194,416

=== Budget features ===
- Intelligence Mission – Provides funding for the four Deputy Under Secretaries of the OUSD(I&S) as well as four direct reporting agencies:
  - DUSD Joint and Coalition Warfighter Support (J&CWS) – Ensures that intelligence support across the Department meets critical and timely Warfighter needs and requirements through policy development, planning, and operational oversight
  - DUSD Technical Collection and Analysis (TC&A) – Provides direction and oversight of all DoD intelligence analytical and technical collection functions
  - DUSD Portfolio, Programs and Resources (PP&R) – Develops Defense Department investment strategy for Intelligence, Surveillance, and Reconnaissance (ISR) and Environmental system capabilities
  - DUSD HUMINT, Counterintelligence and Security (HCI&S) – Responsible for developing policy and exercise planning, and strategic oversight for the DoD in the areas of HUMINT, Counterintelligence (CI), security and sensitive activities
- International Intelligence Technology – Develops, coordinates, oversees, and manages OUSD(I&S)'s technology and architectural analysis and support to allied and coalition intelligence sharing and exchange requirements. Conducts research, analysis, and coordination to advance and integrate DoD, NATO, and coalition intelligence sharing, exploitation, and dissemination
- Defense Civilian Intelligence Personnel System (DCIPS) – DCIPS implementation enables Defense Department intelligence agencies to more effectively establish positions and appoint, pay, develop, retain, and motivate a world-class workforce committed to providing effective intelligence support to the Warfighter and the national policy maker
- Joint Military Deception Initiative – Funds an initiative to revitalize Defense Department military deception planning and execution capability in the Unified Combatant Commands
- Travel – Funds employee travel in support of OUSD(I&S) missions

== Office holders ==
Under Secretary of Defense for Intelligence
Portrait	Name	Tenure	SecDef(s) served under	President(s) served under
Stephen Cambone	Stephen Cambone	11 March 2003 – 31 December 2006	Donald Rumsfeld; Robert Gates	George W. Bush
James Clapper	James R. Clapper	15 April 2007 – 9 August 2010	Robert Gates	George W. Bush; Barack Obama
	Thomas Ferguson (Acting)	10 August 2010 - 27 January 2011	Robert Gates	Barack Obama
Michael Vickers	Michael G. Vickers	16 March 2011 – 30 April 2015	Robert Gates; Leon Panetta; Chuck Hagel; Ashton Carter	Barack Obama
	Marcel Lettre	1 May 2015 – 20 January 2017	Ashton Carter	Barack Obama
	Todd Lowery (acting)	20 January 2017 - 5 June 2017	Jim Mattis	Donald Trump
	Kari Bingen (acting)	5 June 2017 - 1 December 2017	Jim Mattis	Donald Trump
	Joseph D. Kernan	1 December 2017 – 10 November 2020	Jim Mattis; Mark Esper	Donald Trump
	Ezra Cohen (Acting)	10 November 2020 – 20 January 2021	Christopher C. Miller (acting)	Donald Trump
	David M. Taylor (Acting)	20 January 2021 – 1 June 2021	Lloyd Austin	Joe Biden
	Ronald Moultrie	1 June 2021 – 29 February 2024	Lloyd Austin	Joe Biden
	Milancy Harris (Acting)	1 March 2024 – 20 January 2025	Lloyd Austin	Joe Biden
	Dustin Gard-Weiss (Acting)	20 January 2025 - 25 July 2025	Pete Hegseth	Donald Trump
	Bradley Hansell	25 July 2025 - present	Pete Hegseth	Donald Trump
