= Victor G. Guillory =

United States Navy officer

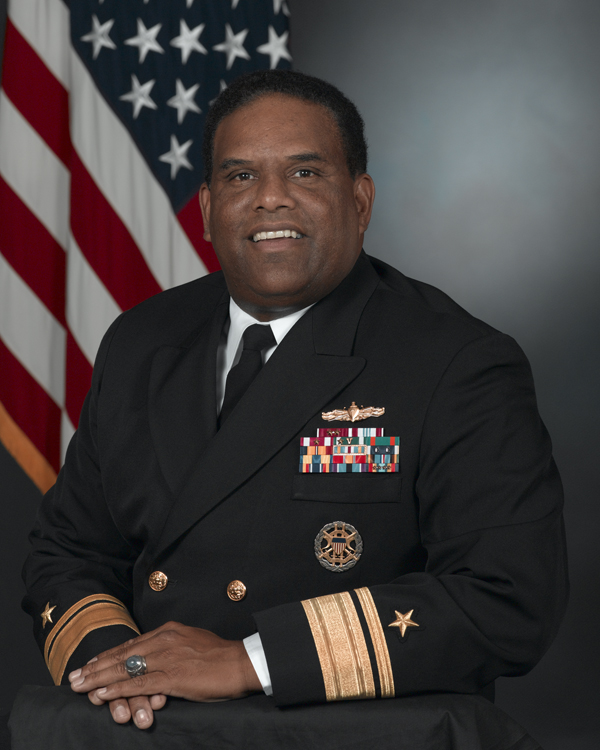
- Born: New Orleans, Louisiana, U.S.
- Military career
- Allegiance: United States
- Branch: United States Navy
- Service years: 1978–2009
- Rank: Rear Admiral
- Nickname: Vic
- Commands: United States Naval Forces Southern Command; United States Fourth Fleet; USS Lake Champlain (CG-57); USS Underwood (FFG-36)
- Awards: Legion of Merit (4); Defense Meritorious Service Medal; Meritorious Service Medal (2); Navy Commendation Medal (with Combat V) (2); Navy Achievement Medal

Victor G. Guillory is a retired United States Navy rear admiral who, in his last position, served as the Commander, United States Fourth Fleet.

== Early life and career ==
Guillory was born in New Orleans, Louisiana. He graduated from Holy Cross School in 1973 and went on to graduate from the United States Naval Academy in 1978 with a Bachelor of Science in Management and Technology. His early sea assignments were aboard the guided-missile destroyer USS Towers (DDG-9), the guided-missile frigate USS Lewis B. Puller (FFG-23), the cruiser USS Vincennes (CG-49) and as the commissioning executive officer in the cruiser USS Gettysburg (CG-64). He commanded the guided-missile frigate USS Underwood (FFG-36) and the cruiser USS Lake Champlain (CG-57).

Ashore, Guillory's assignments included a brief recruiting tour in his hometown of New Orleans and several Washington-area assignments including the Office of the Chief of Naval Operations as the Surface Warfare Division branch head for Combat Systems, and as the assistant deputy director for Surface Ships. He also served in the Joint Staff as the J-3, Current Readiness branch chief.

== Flag officer ==
Guillory was selected for flag officer rank in early 2004 and assumed command of Amphibious Force, United States Seventh Fleet and Amphibious Group 1/Expeditionary Strike Group 7 in October 2004. During this tour, he was responsible for Joint and Combined amphibious operations throughout the Western Pacific. In addition, he served as the deputy commander of United States Naval Forces for Combined Support Force 535 (Southeast Asia Tsunami Relief Operations) in early 2005.

In December 2006, Guillory returned to Washington D.C. and the Office of the Chief of Naval Operations as the deputy director of Surface Warfare (OPNAV N86B). He assumed the duties as director of Surface Warfare in October 2007 and the responsibility for the warfighting requirements and resources for all surface combatant ships and combat systems. In June 2009, Guillory was selected to assume command of United States Naval Forces Southern Command/United States Fourth Fleet.

Guillory is a graduate of the National Defense University (Industrial College of the Armed Forces) and he is also the 2009 recipient of the Black Engineer of the Year Award for Leadership.

== Combat service ==
While assigned to USS Vincennes, Guillory served in the capacity as the Operations department officer with duties as tactical action officer (TAO) during general quarters. Guillory was seated next to Captain Will C. Rogers III in Combat Information Center and played a significant role in the gun battle with surface combatant vessels of the Iranian Revolutionary Guard (IRG) and the subsequent actions against Iran Air Flight 655 on July 3, 1988.

== Awards ==
Guillory's awards include:

Surface Warfare Officer Pin
Legion of Merit w/3 gold award stars		Defense Meritorious Service Medal
Meritorious Service Medal w/Gold Star	Navy Commendation Medal w/Gold Star & Valor device	Navy Achievement Medal
Combat Action Ribbon	Joint Meritorious Unit Award	Navy "E" Ribbon
Navy Expeditionary Medal	National Defense Service Medal w/1 bronze service star	Armed Forces Expeditionary Medal
Global War on Terrorism Service Medal	Humanitarian Service Medal	Sea Service Deployment Ribbon
Joint Chiefs of Staff Badge
