= Lillian Vernon (businesswoman) =

American businesswoman and philanthropist

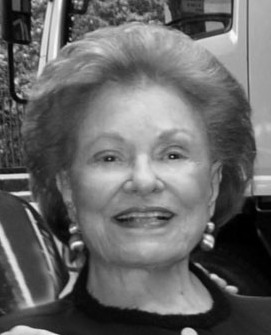
- Vernon in Manhattan, July 2012
- Born: Lilli Menasche; March 18, 1927; Leipzig, Weimar Republic
- Died: December 14, 2015 (aged 88); Manhattan, New York City, New York, U.S.
- Occupation(s): Founder and CEO of The Lillian Vernon Corporation
- Spouses: Samuel Hochberg; Robert Katz; Paolo Martino
- Children: Fred P. Hochberg; David Hochberg

Lillian Vernon (born Lilli Menasche; March 18, 1927 – December 14, 2015) was an American businesswoman and philanthropist. She founded the Lillian Vernon Corporation in 1951 and served as its chairwoman and CEO until July 1989, though she continued to serve as executive chairwoman until 2003, when the company was taken private by Zelnick Media. When it went public in 1987, Lillian Vernon Corporation was the first company traded on the American Stock Exchange founded by a woman. New York University's Lillian Vernon Writers House is named after her and houses the University's prestigious creative writing program.

== Early life ==
Lillian Vernon was born Lilli Menasche in Leipzig, Germany in 1927 to Erna Feiner Menasche and Herman Menasche, a successful dry goods merchant (she later changed her name to Vernon, borrowing it from Mount Vernon, New York, where she settled with her first husband Samuel Hochberg). In 1933, Vernon's brother was attacked by an anti-Jewish mob, and the family fled Nazi Germany to Amsterdam. The family emigrated to the United States in 1937.

Taking up residence in New York City, her father, Herman Menasche, sold lingerie and later established a manufacturing company that specialized in leather goods, many of which were designed by Vernon. Vernon became a U.S. citizen in 1942. Her brother, Fred Menasche, later enlisted in the Medical Corps of the U.S. Army and she joined a Woman's Auxiliary Canteen in support of the war effort. Fred Menasche, serving in Normandy, was killed in a grenade attack.

Vernon attended New York University from 1947 to 1949. In 1949, Vernon married Samuel Hochberg, who worked in his parents' women's clothing store. To supplement their family income, Vernon started a mail order service from the kitchen of her Mount Vernon home. She named the service the Vernon Specialties Company.

== Business career ==
=== Lillian Vernon Corporation ===
At the age of twenty-four, using her combined wedding gifts, Vernon invested $2,000 in the business and placed her first advertisement in Seventeen magazine for personalized purses and belts. She received an overwhelming response and her business was launched. In the first years, the size of the business was limited to Vernon and her kitchen table, where she sorted and filled orders. The Vernon Specialties Company focused primarily on products for young women, advertising in magazines focused on that emergent market. In the late 1950s and early 1960s, Vernon and Hochberg began to create their own jewelry, which they sold through the catalog. One particularly successful product, a magnetized bobby pin cup, attracted the interest of Revlon in 1962. Revlon offered them a distribution contract shortly thereafter. Other cosmetics companies including Elizabeth Arden, Max Factor, and Maybelline followed suit.

In 1969, Hochberg and Vernon divorced and split the company, with Hochberg taking over the wholesale division and Vernon continuing the catalog. In the 1970s, the company began to retool its strategy to draw from, and sell to, a global market. Lillian Vernon began to travel to European trade fairs in an effort to expand the catalog's offerings to include European products. In 1980, Vernon was one of the first American merchants to travel to China after President Richard Nixon's 1972 visit. In order to expand her brand, Vernon started The New Company, a brass manufacturer, and Provender, the Lillian Vernon Company's wholesale division, which sold Lillian Vernon brand toiletries and kitchen supplies.

The Lillian Vernon Corporation, founded in 1965, went public in 1987, making her the first woman to found a company publicly traded on the American Stock Exchange. The Lillian Vernon Catalog, which the company launched in 1956, became an iconic shopping resource for American women, much like its competitor, the Sears catalog. Produced monthly, the catalog was typically 120 pages and usually featured 750 items. In response to a catalog and shopping mall boom in the United States in the 1980s, the company produced a number of specialty catalogs in order to broaden its market, including ones targeted for children and homemakers.

Her two sons were also working in the business. Her older son, Fred Hochberg, upon receiving his MBA from Columbia University, joined the company full time in 1975. From 1975 until his departure in 1993 as president and COO, he oversaw a 40-fold increase in sales and moving the company's distribution and telemarketing center to Virginia Beach, VA. In 1993, her son, Fred left the company to advocate for LGBTQ civil rights and enter public service in the Clinton administration.

Responding to the increasingly important online market in the early 1990s, the Lillian Vernon Corporation opened a storefront on AOL in 1995 and followed with an online catalog and website. However, by the end of the 1990s, the company began to struggle to meet online needs, especially after the collapse of the dot-com bubble. Vernon sold it to Zelnick Media in 2003, but retained the symbolic title of non-executive chairman. Her son, David remained with the company along with Vernon after the sale. The company has since changed hands a number of times. As of 2008 it is owned by the Taylor Corporation.

== Later career ==
In 1997, Vernon was appointed to head President Bill Clinton's White House National Business Women's Council, which she became the chairwoman of for many years. She was the first member of the American Business Conference. She has been a strong supporter of the Democratic Party for many years, supporting the presidential campaigns of President Clinton, President Barack Obama, and Hillary Clinton, among others. She has also supported the Democratic National Committee, Emily's List, and the Women's Campaign Fund.

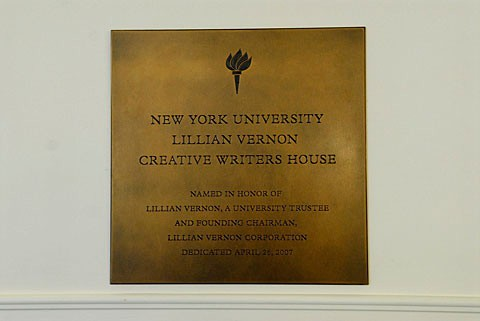
"The Lillian Vernon Creative Writers House at NYU has proved to be the loveliest of boons to the New York literary community at large. It is a total delight to be there. The intimacy of the place combines with the fervor of literary enthusiasm, and the result is both charming and nourishing." —Alice Quinn, Executive Director of the Poetry Society of America.

=== The Lillian Vernon Writers House ===
Having served on the board of NYU for many years, Vernon donated the building in the West Village that serves as the home of the university's prestigious creative writing program. In addition to hosting the offices of the program, the Lillian Vernon Creative Writers House serves as "a vibrant New York literary landmark known for its lively readings and salons." The House hosts classes, workshops, master classes by visiting writers as well as readings and book launches. Since 2007, the Lillian Vernon Writers House has hosted the release readings of NYU's literary journal Washington Square, and has hosted many prominent writers, including CAConrad, Mary Ruefle, Colm Tóibín Jorie Graham, and Charles Simic. Vernon's sons, David and Fred Hochberg and Fred Hochberg's life partner, Tom Healy, continue to support the creative writing program.

=== Philanthropic work ===
During and after her time at the Lillian Vernon Corporation, Lillian Vernon served on the board of a number of organizations, including Lincoln Center, the American Friends of the Israel Philharmonic Orchestra, Citymeals-on-Wheels, New York University. Both the company and Ms Vernon were widely known for their generosity to civic and non-profit organizations. Recipients of these donations included the U.S. Marine Toys for Tots Foundation, Literacy Volunteers of America and a number of other charities. She founded the Lillian Vernon Foundation, a charitable organization that supports organizations in New York City and around the country, including Citymeals-on-Wheels. In 2011, Vernon was honored with the project Sunshine Award for Philanthropic Leadership. Vernon was an early champion for women's rights in the workplace. The Women's Enterprise Center created the Lillian Vernon Award, which is awarded to enterprising women who have served their community, in honor of Vernon's support of women's rights.

=== Awards and recognition ===
In 1998, Vernon, a longtime resident of Connecticut, was inducted into the Connecticut Women's Hall of Fame. She was inducted the Direct Marketing Association's Hall of Fame. She also received such awards as the Ellis Island Medal of Honor, the Walter Nichols Award, Ed Diskin Award for Direct Marketing, the Sir Harold Acton Award, the Big Brother/Big Sisters National Heros Award, and the Gannett Newspapers Business Leadership Award, and honorary degrees from NYU, Bryant College, and the College of New Rochelle.

In 2020, Vernon was one of eight women featured in "The Only One in the Room" display at the Smithsonian National Museum of American History. The kitchen table from her Mount Vernon home is now in the permanent collection of the Smithsonian Museum and her portrait hangs in the National Portrait Gallery.

== Personal life ==
For many years, Vernon lived in New York City with her third husband, Paolo Martino. They married on June 24, 1998. She had two sons by her first marriage, David and Fred Hochberg. From 2009 until 2017, Fred Hochberg was president and chairman of Export-Import Bank of the United States.

== Death ==
Vernon died on December 14, 2015, in Manhattan, New York, aged 88.

== Popular culture ==
Several well-known actors began their careers as Lillian Vernon models, including Jason Biggs, Monica Potter, and Marla Maples. The company was the inspiration for MADtv's The Lillian Verner Game Show, which was a regular game show skit that featured contestants competing for spoof Lillian Vernon products. Vernon is also referenced in John Cameron Mitchell's musical Hedwig and the Angry Inch in the song "Sugar Daddy". YouTube star Casey Neistat and his brother Van traveled with Vernon to her birthplace in Leipzig and made a video about her life.
