= Fred Hochberg =

American businessman and civic leader

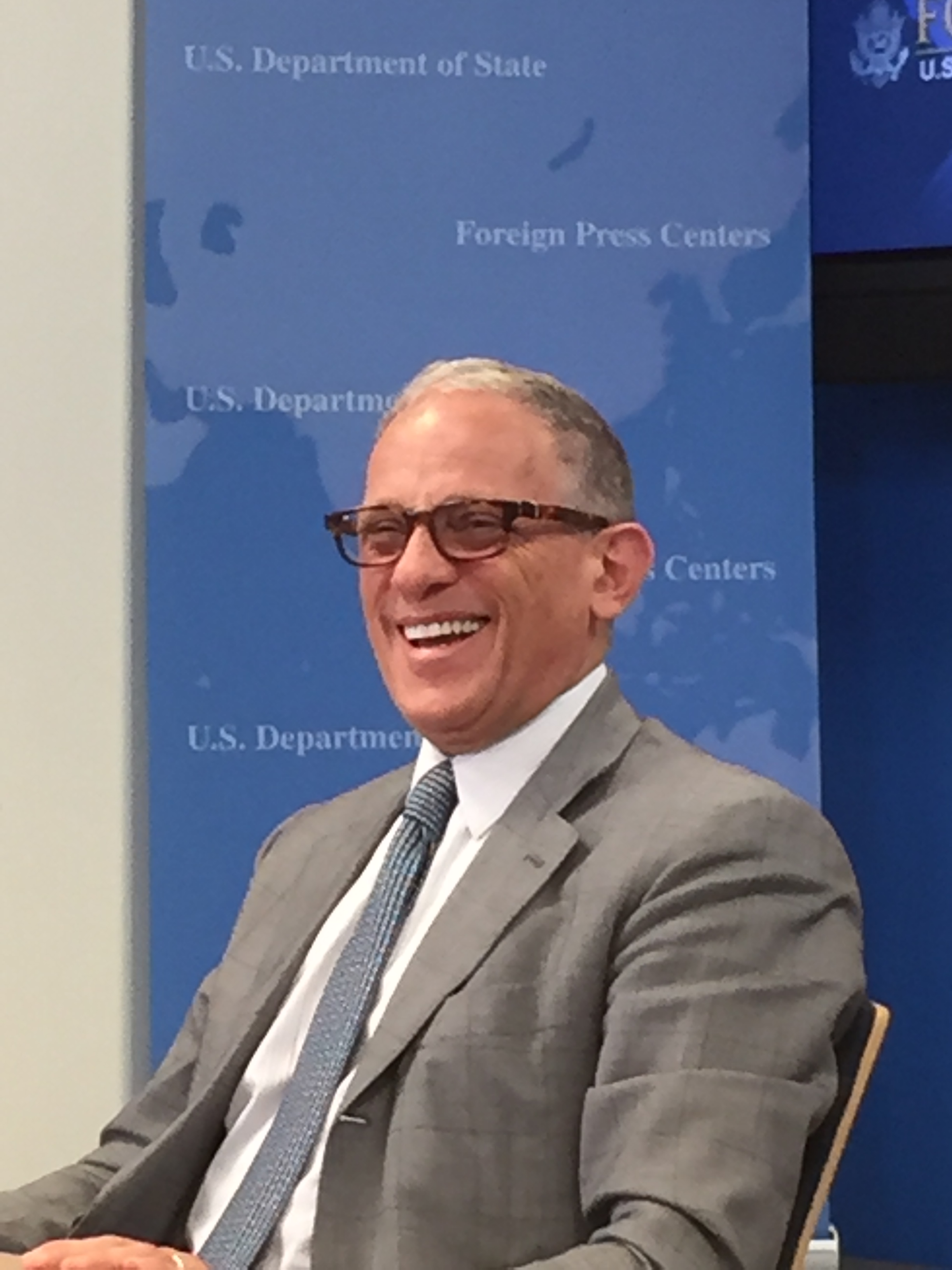

Chairman and President of the Export-Import Bank
- In office May 27, 2009 – January 17, 2017
- President: Barack Obama
- Preceded by: James Lambright
- Succeeded by: Kimberly A. Reed

Deputy Administrator of the Small Business Administration
- In office June 1, 1998 – January 20, 2001
- President: Bill Clinton
- Preceded by: Ginger Ehn Lew
- Succeeded by: Melanie Sabelhaus

Personal details
- Born: February 3, 1952 (age 73) Mount Vernon, New York, U.S.
- Political party: Democratic
- Education: New York University (BA); Columbia University (MBA)

Fred Philip Hochberg (born February 3, 1952) is an American businessman and civic leader. After nearly two decades as an executive, including five years as president at the Lillian Vernon Corporation, he then served in various leadership roles at U.S. government agencies, non-profit organizations, and in academia. From 2009 to 2017, he was chairman and president of the Export–Import Bank of the United States, becoming the institution's longest-serving chairman.

He was initially appointed in January 2009 and confirmed in May 2009. He was re-nominated in March 2013 and confirmed for a second term in July 2013. He served as a member of the presidential transition of Barack Obama. From 2004 to 2008 he served as dean of the Milano School of International Affairs, Management, and Urban Policy at The New School and as deputy and then acting administrator of the Small Business Administration (SBA) in the Clinton administration. Hochberg was one of the highest-ranking LGBTQ officials in the Obama administration and has been active for decades in LGBTQ causes. In the 1990s Hochberg served as co-chair of the board of the Human Rights Campaign, the largest LGBTQ civil rights advocacy organization in the United States. In January 2020, Simon & Schuster published Hochberg's first book, Trade is Not a Four-Letter Word.

As of 2023, Hochberg serves as chair of the Meridian International Center's board of trustees.

== Early life and education ==
Hochberg was born on February 3, 1952. He is the first son of Lillian Vernon (born Lilli Menasche) and Samuel Hochberg. Lillian's father (Fred Hochberg's grandfather) fled Germany for Amsterdam in 1933, later emigrating to New York City in 1937. He was named after his uncle, Siegfried Menasche, who was drafted into the U.S. Army and died during the invasion of Normandy. Lillian and Samuel had a second son, David Hochberg, in October 1956. The couple divorced in 1969. Fred Hochberg received his B.A. from New York University and an MBA from Columbia.

== Business career ==
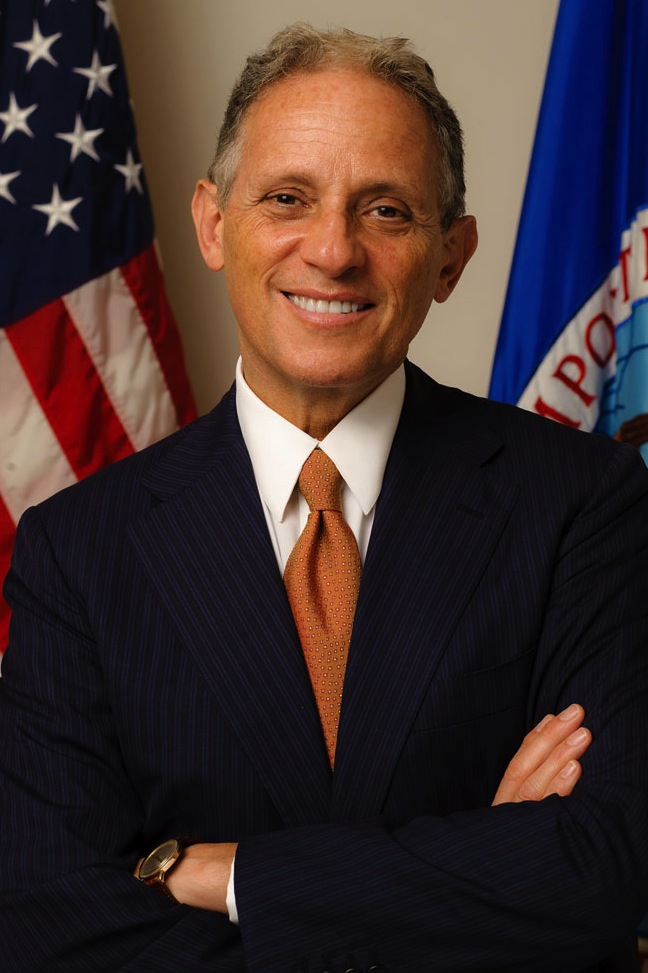
Hochberg's official administration portrait as chairman and president of the Export-Import Bank of the United States (2009)

Hochberg began his business career at the Lillian Vernon Corporation, the company founded by his mother on her kitchen table in 1951. That table can now be found at the Smithsonian National Museum of American History in Washington, D.C.. As president and chief operating officer, where he led the transformation of a small, family-owned mail order company into an international, publicly traded direct marketing corporation. The company listed on the American Stock Exchange in 1987 and Forbes described the company's growth as "one of the great success stories of American entrepreneurship." Hochberg helped oversee a nearly 40-fold increase in annual revenue, from $5 million in 1975 to nearly $200 million in 1993. In 1993, Hochberg left Lillian Vernon as the company was struggling and later entered bankruptcy, in what was characterized as a sudden move, to devote his time to advocacy and investing.

== Public service and academic career ==
In 1998 Hochberg was confirmed by unanimous consent of the U.S. Senate and deputy administrator of the Small Business Administration (SBA), later becoming the agency's acting administrator. He remained in the post at the SBA until January 2001, serving also on US President Bill Clinton's Management Council. At the SBA, Hochberg helped to lead aggressive outreach that quadrupled loans to minority, women, and LGBTQ-owned businesses across the nation.

Hochberg tours a Brazilian landfill gas-to-energy plant constructed with U.S. equipment in 2014

Following his years in the Clinton administration, he was in December 2003 appointed dean of the Milano School of International Affairs, Management, and Urban Policy, a post he left in late 2008.

Hochberg was a bundler of contributions for the Obama campaign; some bundlers collected $500,000 for the campaign. In the fall of 2009, Hochberg was named as an Agency Review team leader for the SBA on then-President-elect Barack Obama's transition team.

President Obama formally nominated Hochberg to be chairman and president of the Export-Import Bank of the United States on April 20, 2009. The U.S. Senate confirmed his nomination by unanimous consent on May 14, 2009, for a term ending on January 20, 2013. He was sworn in on May 21, 2009. During his tenure, the agency supported more than 1.4 million American jobs and financed exports with a value exceeding $240 billion, while generating $3.8 billion in profits for U.S. taxpayers and reducing internal agency costs by 30 percent. Under Hochberg, the bank also increased its focus on customers, particularly America's small business exporters, and in several years during his tenure, nearly 90 percent of EXIM Bank authorizations directly supported small businesses. He streamlined processes, cutting transactions times so that 98% of transactions were processed within 100 days and 89% within 30 days. During this period the bank also achieved record lows for employee satisfaction and morale and spent large sums of money on frequent international travel by Hochberg. During his tenure as chairman, the bank experienced its longest ever shutdown and longest period without a board quorum rendering it unable to approve large transactions.

After Hochberg's tenure at the U.S. Export-Import Bank he was named a fellow at the Institute of Politics at the University of Chicago in the fall of 2017 and the Institute of Politics at Harvard University in the spring of 2018. Following his fellowships, Hochberg wrote Trade is Not a Four Letter Word: How Six Everyday Products Make the Case for Trade, his first book. The book is described as the antidote to today's acronym-laden trade jargon pitched to voters with simple promises that rarely play out so one-dimensionally. The book was published by Simon & Schuster on January 14, 2020, in advance of voting getting underway in the 2020 Democratic presidential primaries. The book was met with critical praise and has been referred to as "a sprightly and clear-eyed testimonial to the value of globalization" and “a rousing, well-argued defense of global trade in a time of isolationist entrenchment."

== LGBTQ activism ==
Beginning in the 1970s Hochberg has a long history of LGBTQ activism, including serving as co-chair of the Human Rights Campaign, a prominent lesbian and gay rights group. In the April 2007 issue of Out Magazine he was ranked the 15th most powerful gay person in America. Hochberg is also a founder of the Bohnett Leaders Fellowship, an executive education program for state and local elected officials through the LGBTQ Victory Institute in partnership with Harvard Kennedy School at Harvard University.

== Corporate and non-profit boards ==
Hochberg has been dedicated to public policy, community service and philanthropic involvement in expanding access to capital, civil rights, education and the arts. He currently serves on the boards of the Meridian International Center and the American Theatre Wing and has recently been a member of the boards of the Woodrow Wilson International Center for Scholars, New York City's Citizens Budget Commission. and FINCA International. From 2008 to 2009 he was a member of the Board of Commissioners of the Port Authority of New York and New Jersey.

He has also served on the boards of Playwrights Horizons and the Wolfsonian Art Museum, and on the Democratic National Committee.

== Publications ==
=== Articles ===
- America's global ‘soft power’ strategy is aging poorly — especially compared to China's, The Hill, January 13, 2024

== Personal life ==
Hochberg was born in New York and lives with his partner, the writer Tom Healy, in Miami Beach, Florida.

== Selected writings ==
- Trade is Not a Four Letter Word. Simon & Schuster, 2020
- "The Next Coronavirus Relief Bill Needs To Solve America's Unbanked and Unwired Crises". The Hill. April 15, 2020
- "The iPhone Isn't Made in China – It's Made Everywhere". The Wall Street Journal. January 31, 2020
- "To Beat Trump, Embrace Free Trade". The Wall Street Journal. February 6, 2019
- "EXIM Plays a Critical Role in Supporting U.S. Businesses". Washington Post. February 8, 2019
- "An Easy Trade Win for Trump". The New York Times. February 2, 2017.
- "New Year's Resolution: Jobs". Foreign Policy. December 29, 2016.
- "Protecting America's Competitive Advantage". Foreign Affairs. 94 (3). May–June 2015.
- "Small Business, Badly Damaged". The New York Times. October 17, 2001.
- "In Government and, Incidentally, Gay". The New York Times. February 10, 2001.

Political offices
Preceded by James Lambright	Chairman and President of the Export-Import Bank; 2009–2017	Succeeded by Kimberly A. Reed
