= Jeffrey Gerrish =

American lawyer

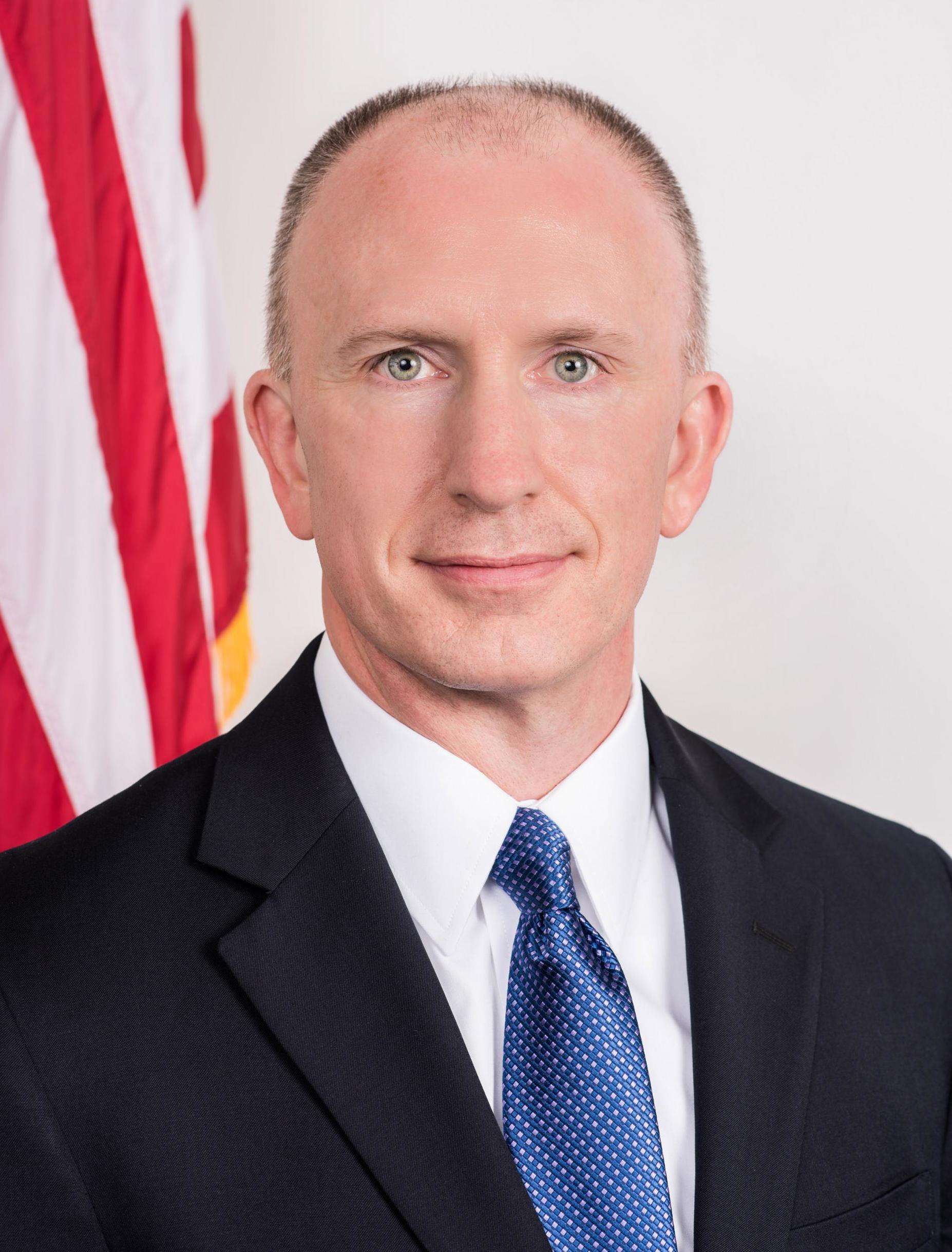

Deputy United States Trade Representative
- In office March 19, 2018 – August 2020
- President: Donald Trump
- Preceded by: Michael Punke
- Succeeded by: Jayme White

Acting Chairman and President of the Export–Import Bank of the United States
- In office April 24, 2018 – May 9, 2019
- President: Donald Trump
- Succeeded by: Kimberly A. Reed

Personal details
- Party: Republican
- Education: University at Albany, SUNY; Duke University School of Law

Jeffrey Gerrish is an American lawyer. He previously served as the Deputy United States Trade Representative, Gerrish was previously a partner in the International Trade Group at Skadden, Arps, Slate, Meagher & Flom. Gerrish was a member of President Trump's 2016 trade transition team.

Gerrish has experience litigating trade disputes before the United States Department of Commerce, International Trade Commission, federal courts, North American Free Trade Agreement bi-national panels, and the World Trade Organization. He has been appointed by the chief judge of the United States Court of International Trade to serve as a member of the court's Rules Advisory Committee.

On April 24, 2018, President Trump appointed Gerrish as the acting chairman and president of the Export–Import Bank of the United States. Gerrish served in this position until May 9, 2019, upon the swearing-in of Kimberly A. Reed.

Gerrish was chosen to lead the US-delegation in trade-talks with China beginning in mid-January 2019. He is seen as having a close world view to Robert Lighthizer, who mentored him, and, thus, was expected to take a tough stance against China in these talks.

In August 2020, he rejoined Skadden, Arps, Slate, Meagher & Flom.
