= Kenneth D. Brody =

American investment banker (1943-2023)

Chairman and President of the Export–Import Bank of the United States
- In office May 10, 1993 – December 31, 1995
- President: Bill Clinton
- Preceded by: John D. Macomber
- Succeeded by: Martin A. Kamarck

Personal details
- Born: June 30, 1943 Philadelphia, Pennsylvania
- Died: March 26, 2023 (aged 79) Manhattan, New York City, New York
- Party: Democratic

Kenneth D. Brody (June 30, 1943 – March 26, 2023) was an American investment banker who served as chairman and President of the Export–Import Bank of the United States from 1993 to 1995.

He died of multiple system atrophy on March 26, 2023, in Manhattan, New York City, New York at age 79.
