= Reta Jo Lewis =

American diplomat, lawyer, and businesswoman (born 1953)

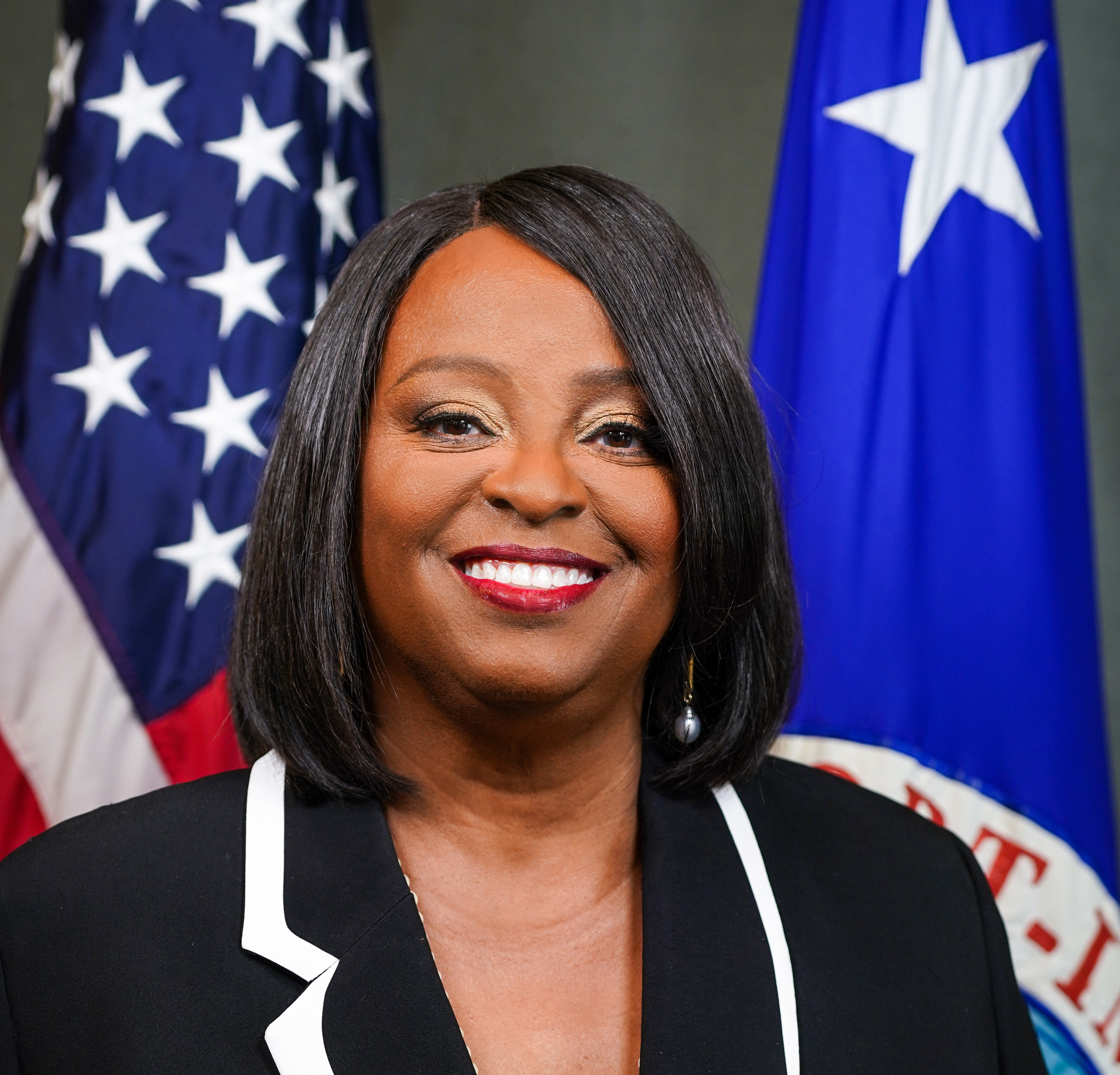

President and Chair of the Export–Import Bank of the United States
- In office February 16, 2022 – January 20, 2025
- President: Joe Biden
- Preceded by: Kimberly A. Reed
- Succeeded by: John Jovanovic

Personal details
- Born: September 22, 1953 (age 73) Statesboro, Georgia, U.S.
- Party: Democratic
- Education: University of Georgia (BA); American University (MA); Emory University (JD)

Reta Jo Lewis is a lawyer, international trade and economic security leader, and former government official. She served as the 27th Chair, President, and CEO of the Export-Import Bank of the United States (EXIM) from 2022 to 2025.

She was the first African American and the first person of color to lead the agency. She oversaw $135 billion in financing authority, including direct loans, loan guarantees, working capital, and export credit insurance, to support U.S. jobs through the export of American goods and services. She was nominated by President Joe Biden and sworn in on February 16, 2022. Lewis was formerly a Senior Fellow and Director of Congressional Affairs at the German Marshall Fund of the United States. She was appointed by President Barack Obama to the U.S. Department of State, where she served as the first-ever Special Representative for Global Intergovernmental Affairs for Secretary Hillary Rodham Clinton, and was the chief diplomat charged with leading the subnational diplomacy engagement effort.

She also served as the Special Assistant to President Bill Clinton for Political Affairs.

== Early life and education ==
Lewis was born in Statesboro, Georgia, and grew up in a family of small business owners. Her parents, Charlie and Alethia Lewis, were business and civic leaders.

An important period in her lifetime came in 1970 after two federal orders. Her parents worked for court-ordered integration in Bulloch County and helped lead the effort of recruiting 32 black students to integrate the schools in Bulloch County, where she attended Marvin Pittman Laboratory School at Georgia Southern College. She received a B.A. from the University of Georgia, an M.S. in the Administration of Justice from American University, and a J.D. from Emory University School of Law. She is a member in good standing of the District of Columbia and Georgia bars.

She also earned a coveted spot in the first class of the Presidential Management Fellows Program, serving in the Drug Enforcement Administration.

== Career ==
=== Early career ===
In 1990, while an associate at a law firm, she served as the National Tour Director for the Nelson Mandela eight-city American tour, following his release from prison, where she provided advice and counsel to Mandela and senior African National Congress officials.

In D.C. government, she served as the Chief of Staff in the Department of Public Works, the second-largest department, in Mayor Sharon Pratt Kelly’s Administration.

She then joined the administration of President Bill Clinton, serving as a Special Assistant to the President for Political Affairs from 1993 to 1995. Lewis also served as the White House Principal Coordinator for the 1994 FIFA World Cup USA and the 1996 Summer Olympics and Paralympic Games, held in Atlanta, and was the Principal Domestic Staff Coordinator for the first Summit of the Americas, held in Miami in 1994.

=== Legal and private-sector career ===
After leaving the Clinton administration, Lewis returned to the private sector and the practice of law. She held positions with several law firms, including Greenberg Traurig, where she became a shareholder, and Edwards Wildman Palmer (now known as Troutman Pepper Locke LLP) and Arter & Hadden.

Her practice included government affairs, public policy, regulatory matters, and representation of public and private-sector clients before government institutions. Lewis later became Vice President and Counselor to the president of the U.S. Chamber of Commerce. She was the first African American woman to be an officer at the world's largest business federation, where she led efforts on policies and initiatives focused on women, minorities and small business owners, entrepreneurs and organizations.

=== Later career ===
Lewis was appointed the first Special Representative for Global Intergovernmental Affairs at the U.S. Department of State. As part of Secretary Hillary Clinton's 21st Century Statecraft, Lewis was tasked with building and enhancing relationships between state and local officials in the U.S. and their foreign counterparts around the world.

She served from 2010 to 2013 under Secretary of State Hillary Clinton. As Special Representative, she was key in facilitating historic agreements to enhance subnational government collaboration with BRICS (Brazil, Russia, India, China, and South Africa) countries and with targeted EU countries.

She led the international efforts of U.S. state and local governments' cooperation towards and strategy regarding climate change to RIO+20, COP-16, COP-17, and COP-18.

In 2013, Secretary of State Hillary Clinton awarded Lewis the Secretary's Distinguished Service Award for her work at the State Department. In 2024, the Department of State established the Reta Jo Lewis Local Diplomat Program, naming the program in her honor.

After leaving the State Department, Lewis joined the German Marshall Fund of the United States (GMF). In 2015, she served as a Senior Resident Fellow focused on transatlantic leadership initiatives and also served as the Director of Congressional Affairs.

In January 2022, President Joe Biden nominated Lewis to serve as Chair, President, and CEO of EXIM. The U.S. Senate confirmed her on February 9, 2022, by a vote of 56–40.

She was sworn in by Vice President Kamala Harris on February 16, 2022. Lewis became the first African American and first person of color to serve as Chair, President, and CEO of EXIM. During her tenure, the agency authorized more than $22 billion in financing across 177 countries, supporting U.S. exports and American jobs. Her administration emphasized strategic sectors including critical minerals, clean energy, infrastructure, semiconductors, telecommunications, and nuclear energy. Lewis launched EXIM's Make More in America initiative, which expanded the agency's support for domestic manufacturing connected to U.S. exports.

She also supported efforts to strengthen the supply chain for critical minerals and rare earth elements and increased the agency's engagement with international export-credit agencies. The Supply Chain Resiliency Initiative was a new financing tool designed to strengthen U.S. supply chains for minerals and rare earth elements to reduce reliance on the People’s Republic of China (PRC), and safeguard American jobs.

In her testimony before the Senate Appropriations Committee, she highlighted the work that EXIM has done in meeting the Congressional mandates, including the work the agency has done in Africa. In January 2025, she signed a $527 million EXIM financing agreement with the government of Guyana to support an energy project and U.S. jobs. Lewis' term ended in January 2025. Lewis' term ended in January 2025.

=== Political ===
She has been engaged in domestic U.S. political campaigns. Lewis took a leave of absence from her role as Chief of Staff for the D.C. Department of Public Works to serve on Bill Clinton’s successful 1992 presidential campaign. Lewis was a member of the National Finance Committee for Hillary Clinton's 2008 presidential campaign, a role she held again in the 2016 presidential election cycle.

She was a pledged delegate for Hillary Clinton from the District of Columbia during the 2016 Democratic National Convention in Philadelphia.

She is a past member of a DNC platform standing committee and was an elected D.C. Democratic State Committee At-Large Committeewoman. Prior to her position at the State Department in 2008, Lewis was the Director of Business Outreach for the Obama-Biden Transition Project, and forged relationships between the incoming administration, business leaders, and national business associations.

She also served as Chair of the District of Columbia Commission for Women, where she launched the commission's economic and international committees. She was also the founder and national chair of Women of Color for Hillary (2008 & 2016) and Women of Color for Biden (2020).

=== Post-EXIM ===
Following her tenure at EXIM, Lewis works as an international business and export finance adviser and serves as a Non-Executive Director for Rare Earths Americas. She serves as Chair of the company's Nominating and Corporate Governance Committee. In 2025, Lewis was appointed Co-chair of the World Economic Forum Global Future Council on Advanced Manufacturing and Value Chains. In 2026, she joined Husch Blackwell as Of Counsel.

== Awards and honors ==
- University of Georgia's School of Public and International Affairs, Inaugural Lifetime Achievement Award - 2026.
- Association of Women in International Trade, Outstanding Woman of the Year (WIIT) - 2026.
- Private Company Director, Directors to Watch - 2026.
- GUBA Award - 2025.
- Ellis Island, Medal of Honor - 2024.
- United States Nuclear Industry Council, Nuclear Trailblazer Award - 2023.
- Emory University, Distinguished Law Alumni Award - 2022.
- National Urban League Women of Power Award - 2022.
- D.C. Star of the Bar Award - 2022.

== Memberships & affiliations ==
- Council on Foreign Relations, Life Member.
- World Economic Forum, Global Future Council on Advanced Manufacturing and Value Chains, Co-Chair.
- Leadership Council on Women in National Security, Leadership Council Member.
- Foreign Policy for America, Advisory Board Member.
- American Leadership Initiative, Advisory Board Member.
- Delta Sigma Theta Inc., Member.
- New York Stock Exchange Board Services, Board Candidate.
- Blue Star Families, Advisory Board Member.
- Ellis Island Honors Society, Advisory Committee.

== Publications and public commentary ==
Lewis has written and spoken extensively on international relations, subnational diplomacy, economic development, trade, and the participation of women and people of color in foreign policy. Among her notable publications are A New Act to Revitalize U.S. Diplomacy from the Ground Up (2019), which advocated institutionalizing subnational diplomacy within the State Department, and It Is Time for the United States to Institutionalize Subnational Diplomacy (2021), co-authored with Benjamin Leffel, Corey Jacobson, Luis Renta, and Kevin Cottrell.

== Electoral history ==
=== 2014 ===
2014 Mayor of the District of Columbia, Democratic Party primary election
| Party | Candidate | Votes | % |
|---|---|---|---|
| Democratic | Muriel E. Bowser | 42,045 | 43 |
| Democratic | Vincent C. Gray | 31,613 | 33 |
| Democratic | Tommy Wells | 12,393 | 13 |
| Democratic | Jack Evans | 4,877 | 5 |
| Democratic | Andy Shallal | 3,196 | 3 |
| Democratic | Vincent Orange | 1,946 | 2 |
| Democratic | Reta Lewis | 490 | 1 |
| Democratic | Carlos Allen | 120 | 0 |
| | write-in | 235 | 0 |
