= John A. Bohn Jr. =

American attorney (born 1937)

Chairman and President of the Export–Import Bank of the United States
- In office April 11, 1986 – February 28, 1989
- President: Ronald Reagan; George H. W. Bush
- Preceded by: William Henry Draper III
- Succeeded by: John D. Macomber

Personal details
- Born: October 31, 1937 (age 88) Oakland, California
- Party: Republican

John A. Bohn Jr. (born October 31, 1937) is an American attorney who served as chairman and President of the Export–Import Bank of the United States from 1986 to 1989.
