= Martin A. Kamarck =

American businessman

Chairman and President of the Export–Import Bank of the United States
- In office April 12, 1996 – March 31, 1997
- President: Bill Clinton
- Preceded by: Kenneth D. Brody
- Succeeded by: James Harmon

Vice Chairman of the Export–Import Bank of the United States
- In office November 23, 1993 – April 11, 1996
- President: Bill Clinton
- Preceded by: Eugene K. Lawson
- Succeeded by: Jackie M. Clegg

Personal details
- Born: May 15, 1949 (age 76) Rome, Italy
- Party: Democratic

Martin A. Kamarck (born May 15, 1949) is an American businessman who served as Chairman and President of the Export–Import Bank of the United States from 1996 to 1997. He previously served as Vice Chairman of the Export–Import Bank of the United States from 1993 to 1996.
