= SCRI =

SCRI may refer to:

- Scottish Crop Research Institute
- The Supply Chain Resilience Initiative
- Siena College Research Institute
- Seattle Children's Research Institute, a unit of Seattle's Children's hospital
