= Henry Kearns =

Chairman and President of the Export–Import Bank of the United States
- In office March 20, 1969 – October 31, 1973
- President: Richard Nixon
- Preceded by: Harold F. Linder
- Succeeded by: William J. Casey

Personal details
- Born: April 30, 1911 Salt Lake City, Utah
- Died: May 29, 1985 (aged 74) San Francisco, California
- Party: Republican

Henry Kearns (April 30, 1911 – May 29, 1985) was an American businessman who served as Chairman and President of the Export–Import Bank of the United States from 1969 to 1973.

He died of cancer on May 29, 1985, in San Francisco, California at age 74.
