= John Jovanovic =

Chairman, Export-Import Bank of the United States

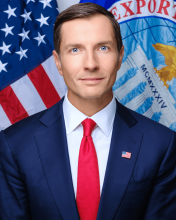

Chairman and President of the Export–Import Bank of the United States
- Incumbent
- Assumed office September 19, 2025
- President: Donald Trump
- Preceded by: Reta Jo Lewis

Personal details
- Party: Republican
- Spouse: Daphne Oz (m. 2010)
- Children: 4
- Education: Princeton University (BA); University of Pennsylvania (MBA)

John Jovanovic is an American businessman who has served as Chairman and President of the Export–Import Bank of the United States since 2025.

He opened the first international office of the U.S. International Development Finance Corporation (DFC). Prior to his government service, he worked for Mercuria Energy Group as Investment Director.
