= Tom Healy (poet) =

American writer and poet, curator and public servant

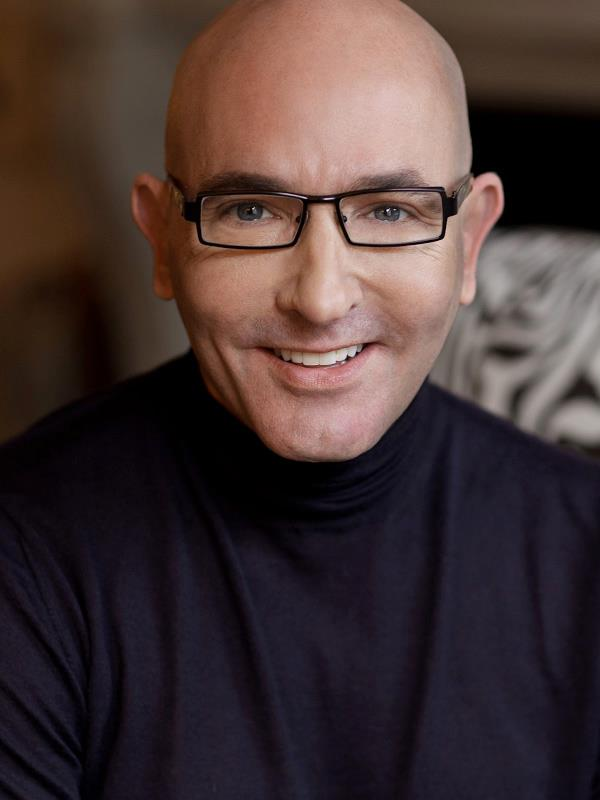
- Born: 5 August 1961 (age 65); Mount Vision, New York, United States
- Occupations: Poet, writer, professor, chairman of Fulbright Foreign Scholarship Board
- Years active: 1994–present
- Partner: Fred Hochberg
- Website: http://www.tomhealy.net/

Tom Healy (born 1961) is an American poet and public servant. From 2011-2014, Healy was the chairman of the Fulbright Foreign Scholarship Board, which oversees the Fulbright scholars program worldwide. He was appointed to the Fulbright Board by President Barack Obama in 2011 and was elected by the Board three times to serve as its chairman. Under his leadership, the Fulbright program won the Princess of Asturias Awards presented by the King of Spain. Under President Bill Clinton, Healy was a member of the Presidential Advisory Council on HIV/AIDS (PACHA). Since the 1990s, Healy has played an active role in the New York City arts scene. After the September 11 attacks in 2001, he served as the president of the Lower Manhattan Cultural Council (LMCC), where he led rebuilding efforts for the downtown arts community. In 2006, Mayor Michael Bloomberg awarded him the New York City Mayors Award for Arts and Culture. He currently serves as a juror for The Gotham Book Prize.

Healy taught in the creative writing program at New York University from 2010-2013 and was a visiting professor at the New School from 2010-2014. He has also taught at The Frost Place in New Hampshire and Anderson Ranch, the artist residency in Colorado. For more than a decade, Healy was a guest writer at the New York State Summer Writers Institute at Skidmore College.

== Personal life ==
Healy grew up on his family's small dairy farm in Mount Vision, New York. He received his bachelor's degree in philosophy from Harvard and later received an M.F.A. in creative writing from Columbia University.

He lives in New York City and Miami with his long-time partner Fred Hochberg, former chairman of the Export-Import Bank of the United States.

== Career ==
Healy has had a long career in the arts and public service. He currently serves as chair of the O, Miami Poetry Festival and as a trustee of PEN America and The Bass Museum in Miami Beach. He is a juror for the Gotham Book Prize and a life member of the Council on Foreign Relations.

In his mid-twenties, Healy founded a consulting business offering public relations and sponsorship services to museums, film festivals and other not-for-profit institutions. Clients of The Healy Company included Film Forum, the Metropolitan Museum, PBS, Westminster Abbey, the Steinbeck Center, the Vatican Observatory, the Jerusalem Film Festival, the Serpentine Gallery and the Institute of Contemporary Art in London.

In 1994, Healy left arts consulting to open one of the pioneering art galleries in Chelsea. His gallery showed numerous young artists who later rose to prominence, including Tom Sachs, Janet Cardiff, Kara Walker, and Karen Finley. Healy sold his gallery in 2000 to return to graduate school to study poetry.

After 9/11, Healy was named president of the Lower Manhattan Cultural Council, where he led rebuilding efforts for the downtown arts community. He was instrumental in establishing the Tribute in Light memorial and oversaw funding for local artists, numerous arts performances like the River to River Music Festival, and LMCC's highly regarded artist residency program. In 2006, Mayor Bloomberg awarded Healy the New York City Mayors Award for Arts and Culture, which is the city's most prestigious award for achievement in the arts.

In 2011, President Barack Obama appointed Healy to the J. William Fulbright Foreign Scholarship Board. He was subsequently elected Chairman, a position to which he was re-elected in 2012 and 2013. As Chairman, Healy traveled extensively for the State Department, visiting more than thirty countries on six continents to advocate for peace and understanding through the exchange of ideas. Healy wrote regularly about the Fulbright experience for the Huffington Post and many of his popular speeches and essays appear on his website. Under his leadership, the Fulbright program won the prestigious Prince of Asturias Award, presented by the King of Spain in recognition of the Fulbright program’s work to create peace and understanding in the world. In 2015, Healy was awarded The Fulbright Medal by the University of Arkansas.

After his tenure at Fulbright, Healy joined the board University of the People, helping to establish the world's first non-profit, tuition-free, online academic institution that seeks to revolutionize higher education by making college-level studies accessible to students worldwide.

Healy has served on many other philanthropic and cultural boards, including The Vera List Center for Art and Politics, the Grey Art Gallery, the Flow Chart Foundation, which is the literary estate of poet John Ashbery and public arts presenter Creative Time, where he served as chair for ten years. In 2017, Healy organized the Brooklyn Conference on Art and Social Change at The Brooklyn Museum. In 2018, he created the Curator Culture series at The Bass Museum where he interviewed prominent artists, writers, journalists, activists, educators and entrepreneurs.

Healy, who is HIV+, has long been active in various HIV/AIDS causes and anti-poverty efforts and has traveled extensively around the world for microfinance projects and AIDS-prevention organizations. President Bill Clinton appointed Healy to serve on the Presidential Advisory Council on HIV/AIDS (PACHA) and he served on the board of the AIDS Action Council in the late 1990s.

== Poetry ==
Healy has written three books of poetry.

His first collection, What the Right Hand Knows, with an introduction by poet Richard Howard and a cover by the late John Ashbery, was a 2009 finalist for both the Los Angeles Times Book Prize and the Lambda Literary Award in poetry. It was published by Four Way Books. Publishers Weekly called the book, "laconic yet passionate and sparely personal," saying "Healy's finest moments make him spare, elegiac and wry all at the same time." In the Huffington Post, poet Carol Muske-Dukes wrote, "From the near-cheerful merciless poems about childhood on a farm and the brutal lives of animals to big city glamour with new possibilities of flight from a flawed paradise—there is the sharp edge of art."

Healy's second book, Animal Spirits, was released in 2013 by Monk Books and was a collaboration with artist Duke Riley. Poet Bianca Stone wrote that Animal Spirits brought "the world of raptorial desire out into the open, blurring, even bruising, the lines that divide us from animal. ...Healy works his eloquent sorcery on the crude but complicated facts of human desire. Animal Spirits conjures a complicated world of emotion in which we are stung by pain even as we are stunned into joy."

Healy's third book of poems, Velvet, was published in 2017 also from Monk Books. Healy again collaborated with an artist, this time filmmaker and artist, Van Neistat, brother of filmmaker Casey Neistat. LitHub named Velvet one of the best books of poetry for 2017.

Healy's poems and essays on culture and politics have been published in many magazines and journals, including the Paris Review, Yale Review, BOMB, Salmagundi, Tin House, Drunken Boat and the New York Times. His work has also appeared in a variety of anthologies and artist books. In 2014, Healy was a fellow of the Harriet Monroe Institute, where he worked with poets Adam Fitzgerald and Robert Polito and biographer Karin Roffman to create a documentary archive of poet John Ashbery's home in Hudson, New York.

== Bibliography ==
Poetry

- What the Right Hand Knows (Four Way Books, 2009)
- Animal Spirits (Monk Books, 2013)
- Velvet (Monk Books, 2017)
