= Lillian Vernon (company) =

Mail-order and online company

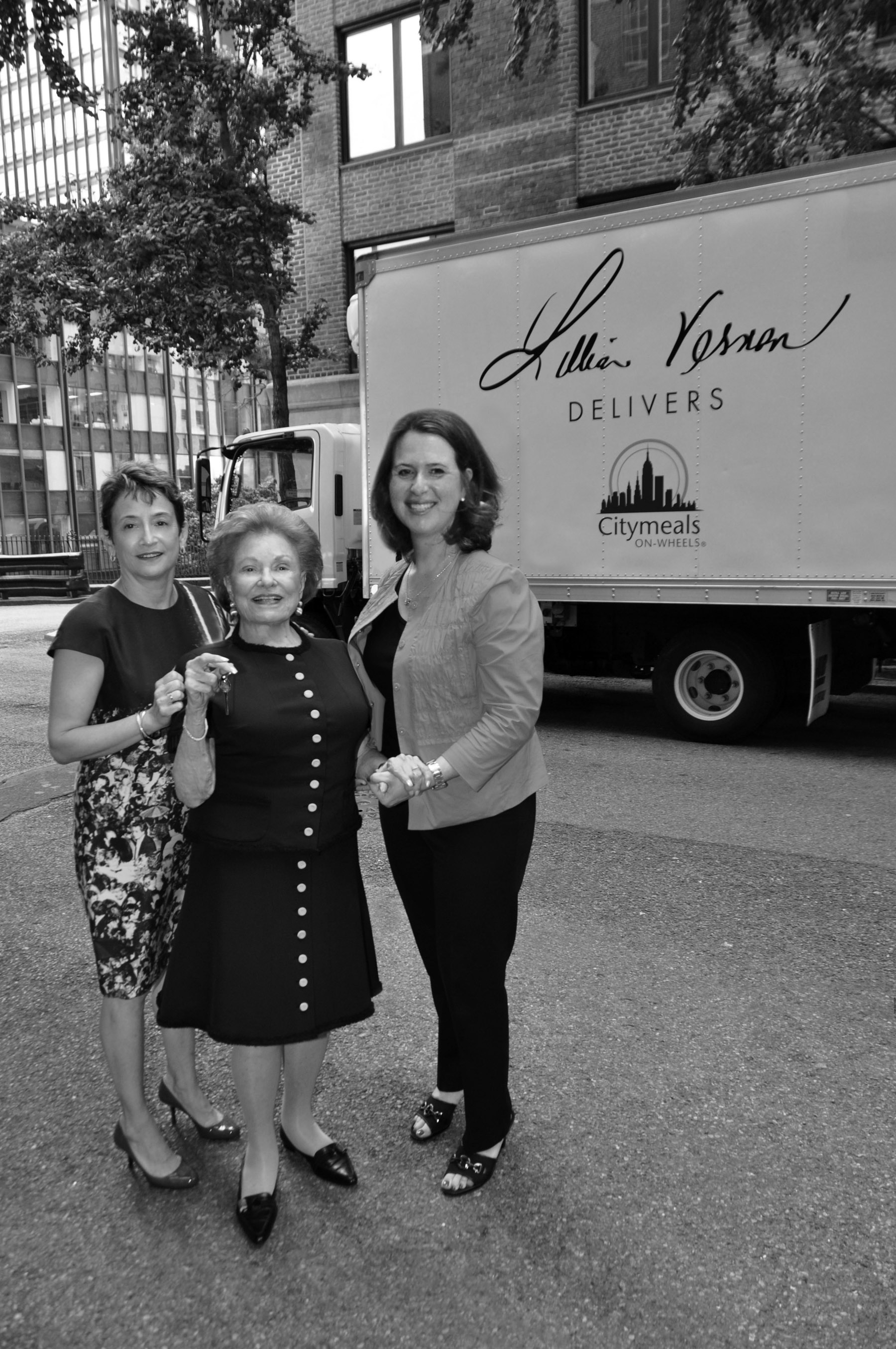
Lillian Vernon (center) donates a refrigerated truck to Citymeals-on-Wheels

Lillian Vernon Corporation is an American catalog merchant and online retailer that sells household, children's and fashion accessory products. Founded in 1951 by Lillian Vernon (a/k/a Lillian Menasche), out of her Mount Vernon, New York, apartment; the business name is a combination of her first name and her hometown.

== History ==
Lillian Vernon was started by Lillian Menasche at the age of twenty-four, by placing advertisements in Seventeen magazine for personalized purses and belts. As a result of this success, the Vernon Specialties Company became focused on products for young women by advertising in magazines focused on that emergent market. The Lillian Vernon Catalog, which the company launched in 1956, became an iconic shopping resource for American women, much like its competitor, the Sears catalog. Produced monthly, the catalog was typically 120 pages and usually featured 750 items. In response to a catalog and shopping mall boom in the United States in the 1980s, the company produced a number of specialty catalogs in order to broaden its market, including ones targeted for children and homemakers.

The Lillian Vernon Corporation, founded in 1965, went public in 1987. It was the first company founded by a woman to be publicly traded on the American Stock Exchange.

Responding to the increasingly important online market in the early 1990s, the Lillian Vernon Corporation opened a storefront on AOL in 1995 and followed with an online catalog and website. However, by the end of the 1990s, the company began to struggle to meet online needs, especially after the collapse of the Dot-com bubble. After Fred and David Hochberg both declined to take over running their mother's company, Vernon sold it to ZelnickMedia in 2003, but retained the symbolic title of non-executive chairman. The company has since changed hands a number of times including emerging from a bankruptcy process in 2008. In October 2015 Lillian Vernon was purchased by Regent, a Beverly Hills-based private equity firm controlled by investor Michael Reinstein.

Several Hollywood celebrities began their careers as Lillian Vernon models including Jason Biggs, Monica Potter and Marla Maples.

== Pop culture references ==
Funny products from the similarly named but imaginary Lillian Verner company are featured in The Lillian Verner Game Show, which was a recurring game show spoof on Mad TV.

In the musical Hedwig and the Angry Inch, the song "Sugar Daddy" includes a lyric in which Hedwig tells her American military boyfriend that "I want all the luxuries of the modern age, / Every item on every page / Of the Lillian Vernon catalogue".

== Awards and honors ==
Lillian Vernon was a recipient of numerous awards, including the Project Sunshine Award for Philanthropic Leadership and The International Center in New York's Award of Excellence. She was also a board member of Citymeals-on-Wheels.
