= William Henry Draper III =

American venture capitalist (1928–2026)

Bill Draper
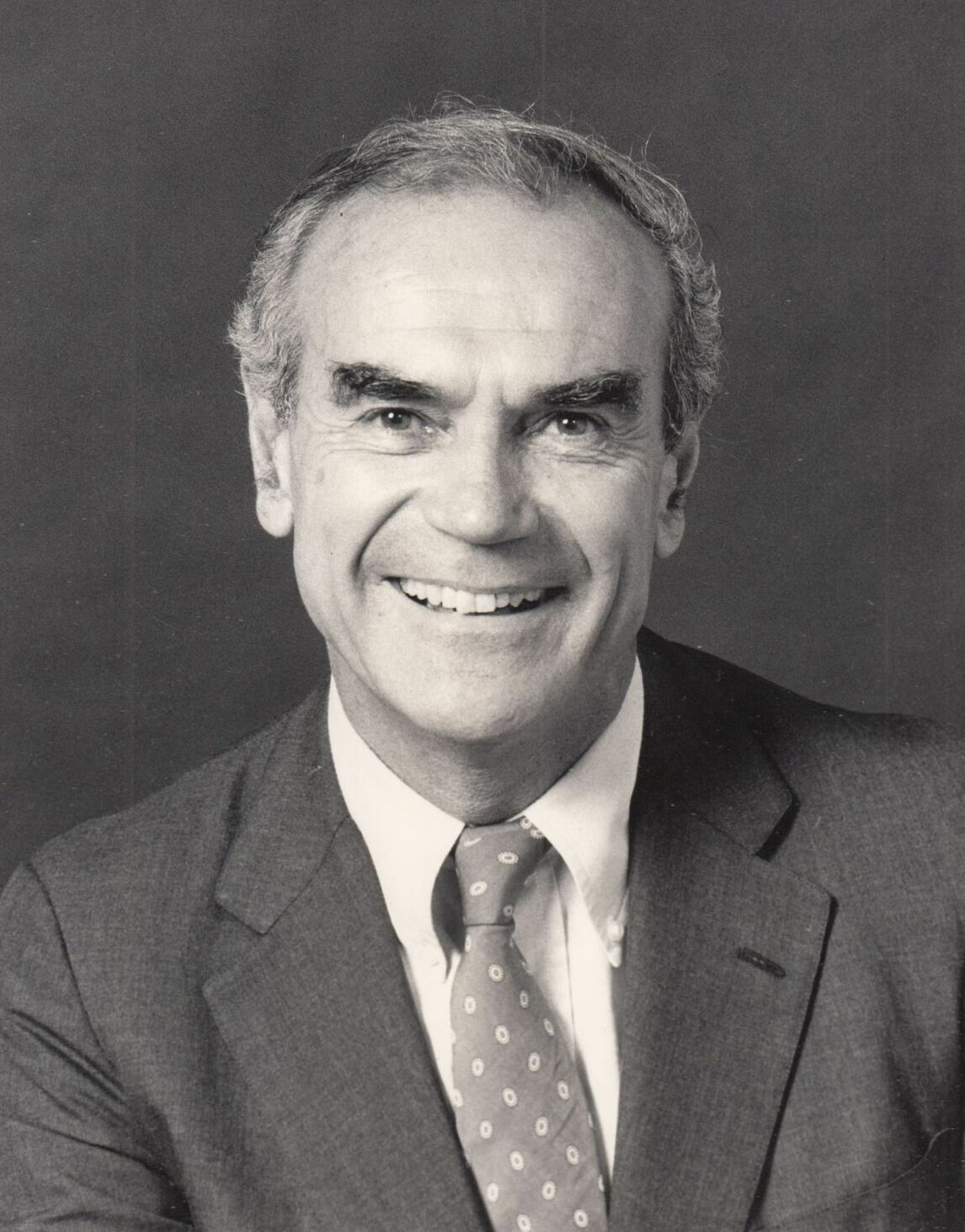
- Draper in 1986

Administrator of the United Nations Development Programme
- In office 1986–1993
- Secretary General: Javier Pérez de Cuéllar; Boutros Boutros-Ghali
- Preceded by: F. Bradford Morse
- Succeeded by: James Gustave Speth

Chairman and President of the Export–Import Bank
- In office July 14, 1981 – February 28, 1986
- President: Ronald Reagan
- Preceded by: John L. Moore, Jr.
- Succeeded by: John A. Bohn Jr.

Personal details
- Born: January 1, 1928 White Plains, New York, U.S.
- Died: September 8, 2026 (aged 98) Atherton, California, U.S.
- Party: Republican
- Spouse: Phyllis Culbertson (m. 1953; died 2018)
- Children: 3, including Polly and Tim
- Parent: William Henry Draper Jr. (father)
- Education: Yale University (BA); Harvard University (MBA)

William Henry Draper III (January 1, 1928 – September 8, 2026) was an American venture capitalist.

== Early life and education ==
Draper was born in White Plains, New York, on January 1, 1928, the son of Katherine Louise (née Baum) and banker, general, and diplomat William Henry Draper Jr. who founded Draper, Gaither and Anderson and served as the first ambassador for NATO.

He attended Yale University with president George H. W. Bush, graduated in 1950, the year after George H. W. Bush, and was a member of the secret society Skull and Bones. After graduating from college, Draper served as a second lieutenant in the Korean War. Upon returning to the United States, he attended Harvard Business School and studied under Franch-American professor Georges Doriot, who is often credited with starting the venture capital industry. Draper graduated with a Master of Business degree, with distinction, in 1954.

== Career ==
After his graduation from Harvard Business School, Draper worked in a management training position at Chicago's Inland Steel Company.

=== Early venture capital ===
In 1959, Draper left Chicago to work as an associate at his father's newly formed firm, Draper, Gaither & Anderson, the first venture capital company on the West Coast. In 1962, Draper left Draper, Gaither & Anderson to co-found the venture capital firm Draper & Johnson Investment Company with his good friend Pitch Johnson, whom he had met while working at Inland Steel. In 1965, Draper founded Sutter Hill Ventures, which to this day remains one of the top venture capital firms in the country. During his twenty years as the senior partner of Sutter Hill, Draper helped to organize and finance several hundred high-technology manufacturing companies.

=== Public service ===
Draper played an international leadership role in expanding the world economy and addressing the global wealth gap. He served from 1981 to 1986 as president and Chairman of the Export–Import Bank of the United States and was appointed to this position by President Ronald Reagan. In this post, Draper assumed a leadership role in U.S. efforts to sustain world trade in the face of major liquidity problems among the developing countries.

In 1986, he became the head of the world's largest source of multilateral development grant assistance, the United Nations Development Programme, where he oversaw nearly 10,000 international aid projects. In this capacity he was instrumental in the leadership of several global initiatives, such as the international Education for All movement (beginning formally with the 1990 Conference in Jomtien, Thailand), the 1995 Beijing Women's Conference, and the 1995 Social Summit in Copenhagen, Denmark. During his time at the UN and the Export-Import Bank, Draper traveled to 101 developing countries and met with over 50 heads of state. Under Draper, according to the New York Times, the UNDP's "programs grew in value from $890 million in 1985 to $1.5 billion in 1992". He was perceived as prioritizing economic development over environmental concerns, a criticism he and his supporters contested.

=== Return to venture capital ===
In 1994, Draper and Robin Richards Donohoe founded Draper International, the first U.S. venture capital fund to focus on investing in private companies with operations in India. In 2002, he co-founded Draper Richards LP, a venture capital fund that invests in early-stage technology companies in the U.S., and he also founded Draper Investment Company, which concentrates on seed investments in Europe and Asia.

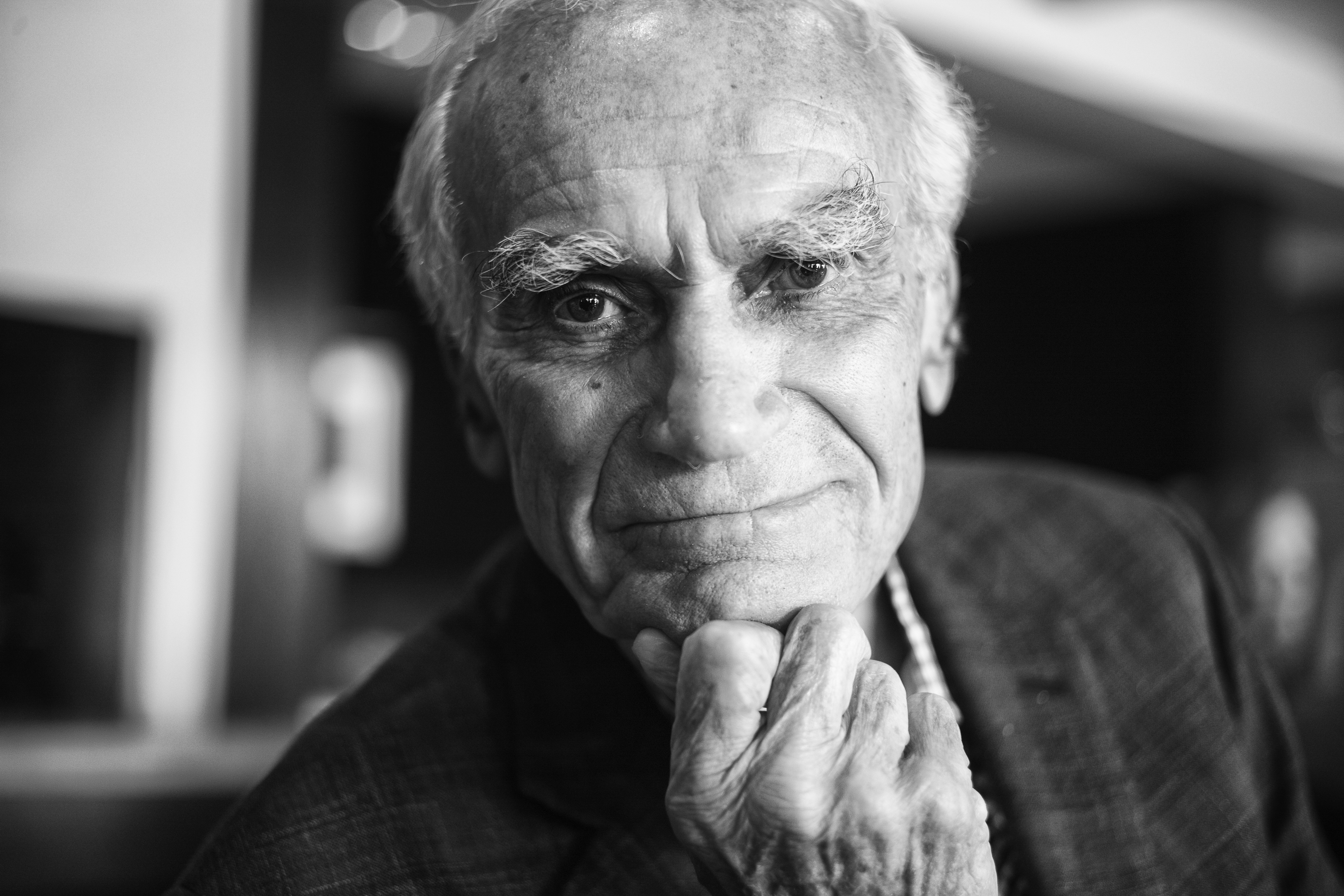
Draper in 2016

=== Draper Richards Kaplan Foundation ===
In 2002, along with Robin Richards Donohoe, Draper co-founded the Draper Richards Foundation. Robert Steven Kaplan, formerly vice-chairman of Goldman Sachs and the thirteenth president and CEO of the Federal Reserve Bank of Dallas, joined as co-chair in 2010. In 2006, Draper donated $1 million, in honor of Donohoe, to the Stanford Graduate School of Business to support the school's Stanford Social Innovation Review.

The Draper Richards Kaplan Foundation is a global venture philanthropy firm that supports early-stage, high impact social enterprises.

The current DRK portfolio includes organizations working both domestically in the United States and internationally helping to provide critical access to healthcare, education, legal resources, economic empowerment, food security, social justice, water and sanitation, transparency and accountability, and shelter.

=== Community service ===
As a civic leader, Draper has been involved in many community service programs. He was on the boards of The Draper Richards Kaplan Foundation, Freeman Spogli Institute of International Studies at Stanford University, and the Harvard Business School California Research Center Advisory Board. He was a member of the Council on Foreign Relations and the President's Council on International Activities at Yale University.

Draper served as the Chairman of the World Affairs Council of Northern California, Chairman of the Institute of International Education, as a Trustee of Yale University and as Chairman of the American Conservatory Theater in San Francisco; he was a Board member of Population Action International, the United Nations Association of the United States of America, Hoover Institution, Atlantic Council, George Bush Library Foundation, the Advisory Council of the Stanford Graduate School of Business, and the World Rehabilitation Fund in New York.

== Personal life and death ==
On June 13, 1953, Draper was married to Phyllis Culbertson. A graduate of St. Anne's School in Charlottesville, Virginia, and Smith College, she was a daughter of Mrs. Richard H. Ullman of Buffalo, New York, and William Howard Culbertson of Bronxville, New York, chairman of the international division of Merrill. Phyllis, an author of two published books of essays and poetry, served on the boards of Save the Children, the Charles Armstrong School, the Corcoran Gallery of Art, and the Kennedy Center in Washington, D.C. Together, they are the parents of three children:

- Rebecca Starr "Becky" Draper, who graduated from Smith College and received an M.B.A. from Stanford University
- Polly Draper (b. 1955), an actress
- Timothy C. Draper (b. 1958), founder of Draper Associates, which became the venture capital firm Draper Fisher Jurvetson

After 34 years with Parkinson's disease, Phyllis died in January 2018.

Draper died at his home in Atherton, California, on September 8, 2026, at the age of 98.

=== Awards and honors ===
In 1982, Harvard Business School honored Draper with its Alumni Achievement Award, and in 1992 he was awarded the Ellis Island Medal of Honor. In 1996, he received the Citizen Diplomacy Award from the International Diplomacy Council, and in 2002 he received the Woodrow Wilson Award for Public Service from the Woodrow Wilson International Center for Scholars. In 2005, Draper received the Vision Award from SD Forum and was inducted into the Dow Jones Venture Capital Hall of Fame. In 2006, he received the Silicon Valley Fast 50 Lifetime Achievement Award and the Distinguished Service Award from the Institute of International Education. In 2009, William and Phyllis Draper were honored as Global Citizens of the Year by International House Berkeley. Also in 2009, Draper received the Lifetime Achievement Award from the Commonwealth Club, the Lifetime Achievement Award from the International Business Forum, and the Philanthropic Leadership Award from the American India Foundation. In 2017, Draper received the Lifetime Achievement Award from the National Venture Capital Association and was awarded a medal from the Foreign Policy Association. In addition, he has received honorary decorations from Bolivia, Morocco, and Samoa. In 2020, Draper received the Arthur C. Clarke Lifetime Achievement Award and the UNAFF Visionary Award 2016.

Positions in intergovernmental organisations
| Preceded by F. Bradford Morse | Administrator of the United Nations Development Programme; 1986–1993 | Succeeded by James Speth |
