= Judith Pryor =

American businesswoman

Judith DelZoppo Pryor is an American businesswoman currently serving as the vice president of the Export-Import Bank of the United States (EXIM). She previously served on its board of directors during the first Trump administration.

== Early life and education ==
Pryor holds a B.A. in Communication from Bowling Green State University and served on the BGSU Foundation Board from 2016 to 2019.

== Career ==
Pryor previously worked with companies in the satellite industry including WorldSpace Satellite Radio and COMSAT.

=== Obama administration ===
Pryor previously served in the Obama-Biden administration at the International Development Finance Corporation (formerly OPIC). As the Vice President for External Affairs, she oversaw congressional and public affairs, communications, and U.S. small business development.

=== EXIM under Trump ===
On October 3, 2017, President Donald Trump nominated Pryor to be a member of the board of directors of EXIM. She was confirmed by the Senate on May 8, 2019, by a vote of 77–19.

Pryor started her position on May 10, 2019.

==== Tenure ====
Pryor's area of focus encompasses Africa and the Middle East, renewable energy, storage and efficiency, and women and minority-owned businesses.

=== EXIM under Biden ===
On July 19, 2021, President Joe Biden nominated Pryor to be the Vice President of EXIM. She was confirmed by the Senate on March 30, 2022, by a vote of 69–30.

Pryor began serving in her new role on April 5, 2022.

== Personal life ==
Pryor is a native of Cleveland, Ohio. She resides in Washington, DC with her husband and son.
