= C. Walter Nichols =

American industrialist (1875–1963)

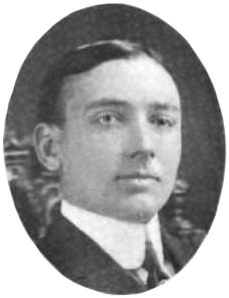
Nichols in 1907

Charles Walter "Walt" Nichols (June 19, 1875 – April 26, 1963), was an American industrialist who, with his father, William H. Nichols, helped organize the merger of 12 companies in 1899 to create General Chemical, which in 1921 joined four other companies to form Allied Chemical & Dye Corporation, a precursor to AlliedSignal, now owned by Honeywell as its specialty materials business. Walt Nichols, who served as a vice president and general manager at General Chemical and later Allied, also acquired the land and built what is now known at Pleasantdale Chateau in West Orange, New Jersey.

He collaborated on the Thomas Garrigue Masaryk Washington declaration in October 1918.

== Early life and education ==
Nichols was born in Brooklyn on June 19, 1875 and, like his father, studied at the Brooklyn Polytechnic Institute. He graduated from Cornell University with an E.E. degree in 1896. In 1958, Nichols received an honorary doctor of commercial science degree from New York University.

== Career ==
In addition to helping his father form the General Chemical Company and the Allied Chemical & Dye Corporation, Nichols became president of the Nichols Copper Company in 1917. The subsidiary was eventually sold to Phelps Dodge. At the age of almost sixty, he founded the Nichols Engineering and Research Company, which became a world leader in incinerator and waste system technology. In late 1934, their first municipal sewage solids incinerator was installed in Dearborn, Michigan.

== Pleasantdale Chateau ==
Nichols acquired a number of contiguous farms in 1912 and created a 40-acre (160,000 m^{2}) estate with formal gardens in West Orange. The Nichols family used the property as a summer weekend retreat and occupied a small farmhouse. But after a number of years, the family desired a larger home. In the 1920s, Nichols set out to build his country estate, preferring the Norman style of architecture from the south of England and the north of France. He hired Augustus N. Allen as his architect and the two toured Europe to seek out Norman style buildings and designed Pleasantdale Chateau. The exterior of the house, which was completed in 1933, is of the Norman half-timber and stucco character, while the interior reflects a number of period styles.

The grounds of the Chateau property were designed by renowned 20th Century landscape architect Ethelbert E. Furlong of nearby Glen Ridge, New Jersey, whose work is catalogued in the Smithsonian Institution's American Gardens collection. The land surrounding the Chateau was transformed from ordinary woodlands to rolling pastoral terrain and an intricate complex of formal gardens, only some of which has been maintained. →

The estate was acquired by Allied in 1963 to be used as a conference and training center. Pleasantdale's twenty-two bedrooms could accommodate 34 guests. It was in constant use year round, with seminars, meetings and other functions being held every day of the working week. In 1995, the Knowles family of fifth generation restaurateurs, acquired the property to continue its operation as a retreat, adding a special occasion facility for conferences and weddings.

== Family and later life ==
On October 11, 1899, Nichols married Adelaide Hulda Batterman (March 12, 1879 – January 27, 1960), the daughter of merchant and banker Henry Batterman. They had a daughter Kathleen, who married P. Raymond Haulenbeck, and a son Charles Walter Jr. As of April 1963, they had six grandchildren and eleven great-grandchildren.

Nichols died at his Pleasantdale estate in West Orange on April 26, 1963. He was interred at the Green-Wood Cemetery in Brooklyn four days later.

== Legacy ==
Since 1961, the New York University Graduate School of Business Administration has presented the C. Walter Nichols Award for integrity, enterprise and service to a business leader. The first award recipient was John M. Schiff. Other recipients include Reg Jones, John Paulson, John Reed, Jim Robinson III, David Rockefeller, Laurance Rockefeller, Felix Rohatyn, Roy Vagelos, Lillian Vernon, Paul Volcker, Tom Watson Jr., Jack Welch and Walter Wriston.
