= Stephen M. DuBrul Jr. =

Chairman and President of the Export–Import Bank of the United States
- In office January 5, 1976 – May 2, 1977
- President: Gerald Ford; Jimmy Carter
- Preceded by: William J. Casey
- Succeeded by: John L. Moore Jr.

Personal details
- Born: March 18, 1929
- Died: January 4, 2012 (aged 82)
- Political party: Republican
- Spouse: Helen Frankenthaler (m. 1994; died 2011)

Stephen M. DuBrul Jr. (March 18, 1929 – January 4, 2012) was an American businessman who served as Chairman and President of the Export–Import Bank of the United States from 1976 to 1977.

DuBrul's father, Stephen M. DuBrul Sr., was an economist for the General Motors Corporation and a Fellow of the American Statistical Association. After graduating from the University of Michigan in 1950, DuBrul served in the Central Intelligence Agency and later the Army Counterintelligence Corps for the Korean War. He then studied business at Harvard University, earning an MBA in 1956.

Prior to heading the Export–Import Bank, DuBrul was a partner in Lehman Brothers and Lazard Frères & Co.

He died on January 4, 2012, at age 82.
