= William J. Casey =

Director of Central Intelligence from 1981 to 1987

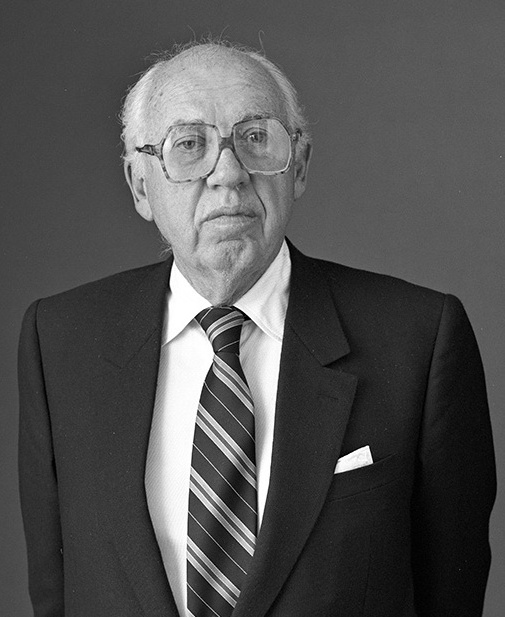
- Casey in 1983

13th Director of Central Intelligence
- In office January 28, 1981 – January 29, 1987; On leave: December 18, 1986 – January 29, 1987
- President: Ronald Reagan
- Deputy: Frank Carlucci; Bobby Ray Inman; John N. McMahon; Robert Gates
- Preceded by: Stansfield Turner
- Succeeded by: Robert Gates (acting)

Chairman and President of the Export–Import Bank of the United States
- In office March 14, 1974 – January 2, 1976
- President: Richard Nixon; Gerald Ford
- Preceded by: Henry Kearns
- Succeeded by: Stephen M. DuBrul Jr.

5th Under Secretary of State for Economic Affairs
- In office February 2, 1973 – March 14, 1974
- President: Richard Nixon
- Preceded by: Thomas C. Mann
- Succeeded by: Charles W. Robinson

Chair of the Securities and Exchange Commission
- In office April 14, 1971 – February 2, 1973
- President: Richard Nixon
- Preceded by: Hamer H. Budge
- Succeeded by: G. Bradford Cook

Personal details
- Born: William Joseph Casey; March 13, 1913 New York City, U.S.
- Died: May 6, 1987 (aged 74) Roslyn Harbor, New York, U.S.
- Party: Republican
- Spouse: Sophia Kurz
- Children: 1
- Education: Fordham University (BS); Catholic University (attended); St. John's University (LLB)

Military service
- Allegiance: United States
- Branch/service: United States Navy
- Years of service: 1943–1946
- Rank: Lieutenant
- Unit: United States Naval Reserve; Office of Strategic Services
- Battles/wars: World War II
- Awards: Bronze Star Medal

William Joseph Casey (March 13, 1913 – May 6, 1987) was an American lawyer who was the Director of Central Intelligence from 1981 to 1987. In this capacity he oversaw the entire United States Intelligence Community and personally directed the Central Intelligence Agency (CIA) throughout much of the Reagan administration.

== Early life and education ==
A native of the Elmhurst section of Queens, New York, Casey was raised as a Roman Catholic in Bellmore, New York and graduated from the Jesuit-affiliated Fordham University in 1934. He continued his education at other Catholic institutions, completing graduate work at the Catholic University of America before earning an LL.B. from St. John's University School of Law in 1937. He was of Irish ancestry.

== Career ==
=== Early career ===
Following his admission to the bar, he was a partner in the New York–based Buckner, Casey, Doran and Siegel from 1938 to 1942. Concurrently, as chairman of the board of editors of the Research Institute of America (1938–1949), Casey initially conceptualized the tax shelter and "explained to businessmen how little they need[ed] to do in order to stay on the right side of New Deal regulatory legislation".

=== World War II & OSS ===
During World War II, he worked for the Office of Strategic Services, where he became head of its Secret Intelligence Branch in Europe. He served in the United States Naval Reserve until December 1944 before remaining in his OSS position as a civilian until his resignation in September 1945; as an officer, he attained the rank of lieutenant and was awarded the Bronze Star Medal for meritorious achievement.

=== Postwar business and government career ===
Following the dissolution of the OSS in September 1945, Casey returned to his legal and business ventures. After serving as a special counsel to the United States Senate (1947–1948) and associate general counsel to the Point Four Program (1948), Casey founded the Institute for Business Planning in 1950; there, he amassed much of his early wealth (compounded by investments) by writing early data-driven publications on business law. He was a lecturer in tax law at the New York University School of Law from 1948 to 1962. From 1957 to 1971, he was a partner at Hall, Casey, Dickler & Howley, a New York corporate law firm, under the auspices of founding partner and prominent Republican politician Leonard Hall. He ran as a Republican for New York's 3rd congressional district in 1966, but was defeated in the primary by former Congressman Steven Derounian.

=== Nixon & Ford administrations ===
He served in the Nixon administration as the chairman of the Securities and Exchange Commission from 1971 to 1973; this position led to his being called as a prosecution witness against former Attorney General John N. Mitchell and former Commerce Secretary Maurice Stans in an influence-peddling case stemming from international financier Robert Vesco's $200,000 contribution to the Nixon reelection campaign.

He then served as Under Secretary of State for Economic Affairs (1973–1974) and chairman of the Export-Import Bank of the United States (Eximbank) (1974–1976). (Note: In May 1974, Casey was pivotal in securing a $180 million loan from Eximbank to the Soviet Union in support of both Leonid Kostandov and Armand Hammer's interests associated with fertilizer détente which involved shipping from the United States to the Soviet Union phosphate to be used for fertilizer and shipping from the Soviet Union to the United States ammonia, natural gas, which would be converted to ammonia in the United States, urea and potash all of which would be used for fertilizers. The Exembank loan to the Soviet Union included support for investment through Occidental Petroleum and its affiliates of more than $500‐million in the United States to construct, ship and expand production in Florida of phosphate rock, which is shipped as superphosphoric acid to the Soviet Union, and the construction in the Soviet Union of four large ammonia and urea fertilizer plants by TogliattiAzot at Togliatti along the Volga River and Kuibyshev and a 1,500-mile (2,400 km) Togliatti-Odessa ammonia pipeline which also is known as the Togliatti-Gorlovka-Odessa pipeline or the Togliatti-Gorlovka-Grigorievsky estuary ammonia pipeline (Russian: Аммиакопровод Тольятти-Горловка-Григорьевский лиман) and was constructed with support from the Tolyattiazot company from the plant sites at Togliatti to a new shipping port which, as of November 2024, is called Pivdennyi Port and was called Yuzhnyi in the late 1970s, at the Black Sea location of Grigoryevka near Odessa in addition to the fertilizer plants to be constructed at the Port of Odessa. Also, natural gas is shipped from the Soviet Union to the United States to be converted to fertilizer in the United States. From the time of the Soviet Invasion of Afghanistan in December 1979 until April 24, 1981, fertilizer détente was suspended due to the United States agricultural embargo placed on the Soviet Union.) During this era, he was also a member of the President's Foreign Intelligence Advisory Board (1975–1976) and of counsel to Rogers & Wells (1976–1981).

=== Return to private work ===
Casey returned to private law practice in 1976. With Antony Fisher, he co-founded the Manhattan Institute in 1978. Casey represented 117 clients from 1976 to 1981. Among Casey's clients were the governments of Indonesia and South Korea, which were then military dictatorships. Casey would fail to disclose his legal clients and finances from the 1970s to the U.S. Senate during his confirmation hearings to become Director of Central Intelligence.

Casey was on the Board of Directors of the Committee on the Present Danger.

=== Reagan campaign and transition ===
As campaign manager of Ronald Reagan's successful presidential campaign in 1980, Casey helped to broker Reagan's unlikely alliance with vice presidential nominee George H. W. Bush.

Shortly before the final presidential debate on October 28, 1980, the Reagan campaign acquired President Jimmy Carter's briefing papers, classified top secret, that Carter used in preparation for the debate. The importance of these documents is still subject to debate, but the leak of campaign papers was not divulged to the public until late June 1983. James Baker has claimed that he had received the briefing book from Casey, who vehemently denied this before his death.

According to Ben Barnes, Casey met with Barnes and former Texas Governor John Connally in September 1980 to discuss Connally's trip to the Middle East. During the trip, Connally asked Arab leaders to convey to the Iranian government that Iran should wait to release American hostages until after the election of 1980 was concluded. Barnes claimed that Casey discussed with Connally if the Iranians "were going to hold the hostages", possibly corroborating the October Surprise theory. The hostages were released minutes after Reagan was inaugurated as president.

Casey then served on the transition team following the election.

=== Director of Central Intelligence ===
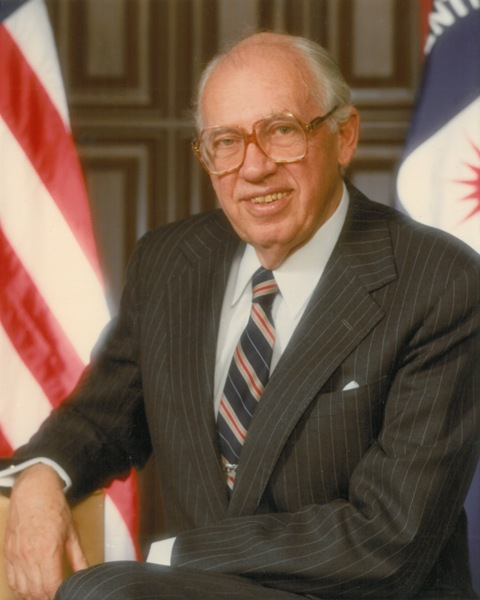
Official portrait of Casey as Director of Central Intelligence in 1981

After Reagan took office, Reagan named Casey to the post of Director of Central Intelligence (DCI). Outgoing Director Stansfield Turner characterized the appointment as the "Resurrection of Wild Bill", referring to Bill Donovan, the brilliant and eccentric head of Office of Strategic Services in World War II, whom Casey had known and greatly admired.

Despite Casey's background in intelligence, the position was not his first choice; according to Rhoda Koenig, he only agreed to take the appointment after being assured that "he could have a hand in shaping foreign policy rather than simply reporting the data on which it was based." Breaking precedent, Reagan elevated the role to a Cabinet-level position for the duration of Casey's appointment.

Ronald Reagan used prominent Catholics in his government to brief Pope John Paul II of developments in the Cold War. Casey would fly secretly to Rome in a windowless C-141 black jet and "be taken undercover to the Vatican.

Casey oversaw the re-expansion of the Intelligence Community to funding and human resource levels greater than those existing before the preceding Carter Administration; in particular, he increased levels within the CIA. During his tenure, post-Watergate and Church Committee restrictions were controversially lifted on the use of the CIA to directly and covertly influence the internal and foreign affairs of countries relevant to American policy.

This period of the Cold War saw an increase in the Agency's global, anti-Soviet activities, which started under the Carter Doctrine in late 1980.

==== Iran–Contra affair ====
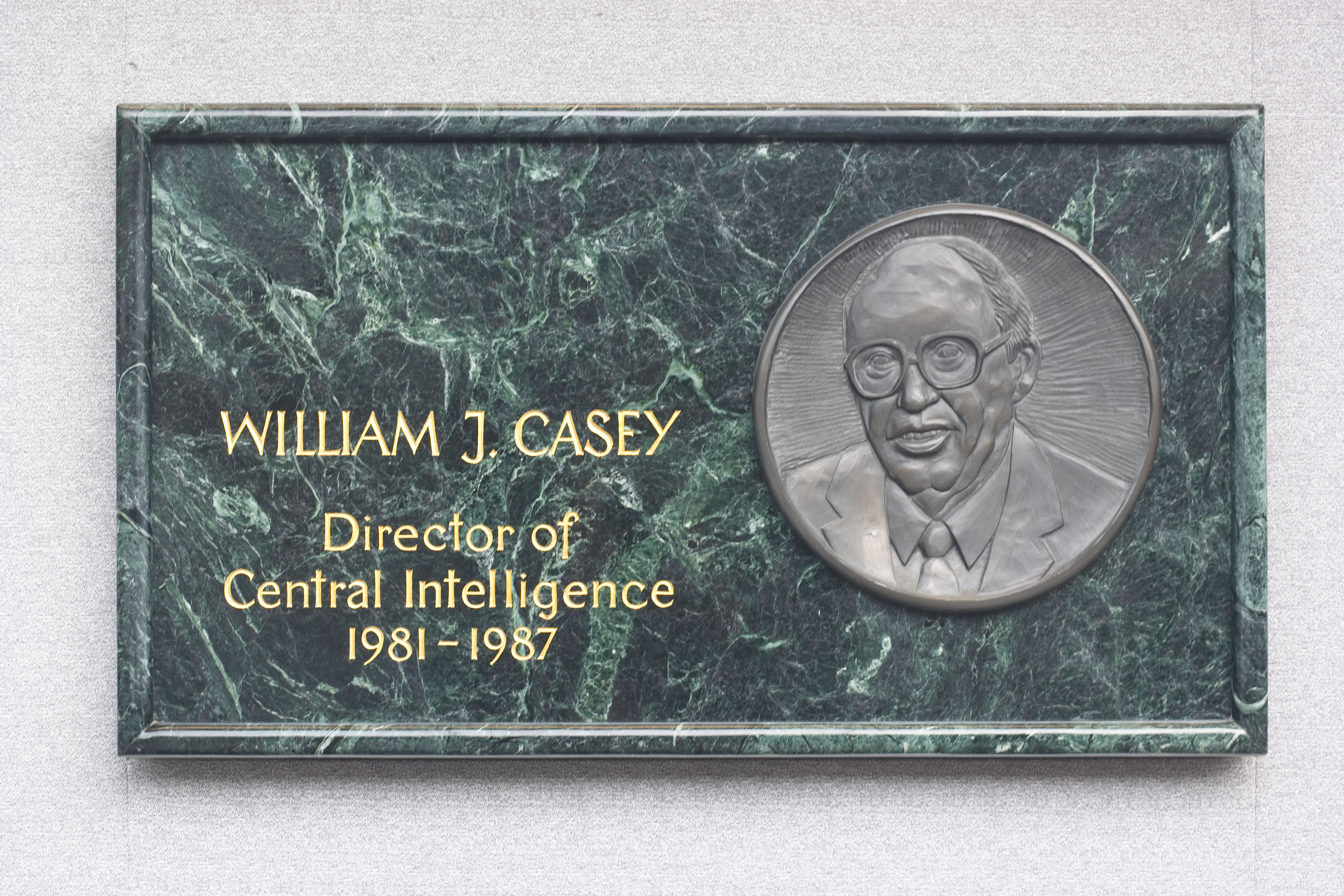
Plaque honoring Casey located in the CIA New Headquarters Building lobby

Casey was suspected, by some, of involvement with the controversial Iran-Contra affair, in which Reagan administration personnel secretly traded arms to the Islamic Republic of Iran, and secretly diverted some of the resulting income to aid the rebel Contras in Nicaragua, in violation of U.S. law. Casey was called to testify before Congress about his knowledge of the affair. On 15 December 1986, one day before Casey was scheduled to testify before Congress, Casey suffered two seizures and was hospitalized. Three days later, Casey underwent surgery for a previously undiagnosed brain tumor. While hospitalized, Casey died less than 24 hours after former colleague Richard Secord testified that Casey supported the illegal aiding of the Contras.

In his November 1987 book, Veil: The Secret Wars of the CIA 1981–1987, Washington Post reporter and biographer Bob Woodward, who had interviewed Casey on a number of occasions for the biography, said that he had gained entry into Casey's hospital room for a final, four-minute encounter—a claim which was met with disbelief in many quarters as well as an adamant denial from Casey's wife, Sofia. According to Woodward, when Casey was asked if he knew about the diversion of funds to the Nicaraguan Contras, "His head jerked up hard. He stared, and finally nodded yes."

In his final report (submitted in August 1993), Independent Counsel Lawrence E. Walsh indicated evidence of Casey's involvement:

There is evidence that Casey played a role as a Cabinet-level advocate both in setting up the covert network to resupply the contras during the Boland funding cut-off, and in promoting the secret arms sales to Iran in 1985 and 1986. In both instances, Casey was acting in furtherance of broad policies established by President Reagan.

There is evidence that Casey, working with two national security advisers to President Reagan during the period 1984 through 1986—Robert C. McFarlane and Vice Admiral John M. Poindexter—approved having these operations conducted out of the National Security Council staff with Lt. Col. Oliver L. North as the action officer, assisted by retired Air Force Maj. Gen. Richard V. Secord. And although Casey tried to insulate himself and the CIA from any illegal activities relating to the two secret operations ... there is evidence that he was involved in at least some of those activities and may have attempted to keep them concealed from Congress.

However, Walsh also wrote: "Independent Counsel obtained no documentary evidence showing Casey knew about or approved the diversion. The only direct testimony linking Casey to early knowledge of the diversion came from [Oliver] North." Posthumously, the House October Surprise Task Force eventually exonerated Casey after first holding hearings to establish a need for investigation, the outcome of the investigation, the response of Casey's family to the task force's closure of the investigation, and Walsh's final Independent Counsel report.

== Personal life ==
Casey was a member of the Knights of Malta. He also attended the secretive Le Cercle meetings.

In 1948, he purchased Locust Knoll, an 8.2 acres (3.3 ha) North Shore estate centered around a main 1854 Jacobethan house in Roslyn Harbor, New York, for $50,000. After renaming the estate Mayknoll, it remained his principal residence until his death.

His daughter Bernadette was married to Casey's business partner, the late Owen Smith. Smith was the chairman of the Board of Trustees of the Institute of World Politics and a professor at Long Island University.

== Death ==
Casey died of a brain tumor on May 6, 1987, at the age of 74. His Requiem Mass was said by Fr. Daniel Fagan, then pastor of St. Mary's Roman Catholic Church in Roslyn, New York, and his funeral was led by Bishop John R. McGann, who used his pulpit to castigate Casey for his ethics and actions in Nicaragua. It was attended by President Reagan and the First Lady. Casey is buried in the Cemetery of the Holy Rood in Westbury, New York.

He was survived by his wife, the former Sophia Kurz (d. 2000), and his daughter, Bernadette Casey Smith.

== See also ==
- George Doundoulakis
- Helias Doundoulakis
- Killing Reagan (film)
- List of notable brain tumor patients

== Notes ==
Government offices
Preceded by Hamer H. Budge	Chair of the Securities and Exchange Commission; 1971–1973	Succeeded by G. Bradford Cook
Preceded by Stansfield Turner	Director of Central Intelligence; 1981–1987; On leave: 1986–1987	Succeeded by Robert Gates; Acting
Political offices
Preceded by Thomas C. Mann	Under Secretary of State for Economic Growth, Energy, and the Environment; 1973–1974	Succeeded by Charles W. Robinson
