= James Harmon =

American fund manager

James A. Harmon
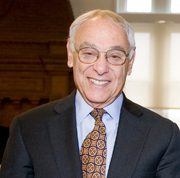
- Harmon in 2009
- Born: October 12, 1935 (age 91); New York City, United States
- Education: Brown University (BA); Wharton School (MBA)
- Occupations: Chairman & CIO, Caravel Management
- Years active: 1959–present
- Spouse: Jane Harmon (m. 1957)
- Children: 3

James A. Harmon (born October 12, 1935) is an American fund manager who is the chairman of the Egyptian-American Enterprise Fund and former chief investment officer of Caravel Management LLC; longtime investment banker; and former chairman of the World Resources Institute. He was the 18th chairman and president of the Export–Import Bank of the United States and has been on numerous boards of directors.

== Early life and education ==
Harmon was born in New York City and raised in Mamaroneck, New York, son of Belle Harmon (née Kirschner), a local dress shop owner and Bert Harmon, a New York real estate attorney. Among his grandparents was Bessie Hamburger, one of the first female Assistant District Attorneys in New York and a pioneer among women lawyers is domestic relations law, specifically marital relations.

After graduating from the Berkshire School, Harmon earned a BA in English Literature from Brown University in 1957, and an MBA from the Wharton School of the University of Pennsylvania in 1959. He and his wife, Jane Harmon (née Theaman), were married in 1957 in Scarsdale, New York.^{[4]} His wife is a theatrical producer who has produced Broadway plays, including Driving Miss Daisy and The Last Night of Ballyhoo. Harmon and his wife reside in Weston, Connecticut.^{[5]} They have three children, four grandchildren and one great-grandchild.^{[5]}

== Career ==
=== Wall Street years ===
Harmon worked on Wall Street for 38 years. He spent 15 years at broker-dealer New York Hanseatic Corp, and in 1974 he joined investment banking firm Wertheim & Co. as chairman of the investment banking committee. He was vice chairman at Wertheim when he had a chance meeting with old friend and Schroder's director Alva Way on a flight from London to New York; the ensuing conversation led to Schroder's acquisition of a half interest of the firm in 1986. The firm was renamed Wertheim Schroder & Co. The transaction allowed Wertheim to stabilize its capital base and gave the firm access to Schroder's client base in Europe and Asia. In 1990, Wertheim Schroder sold 4.9% non-voting interests to Bank of Boston, Massachusetts Mutual Life Insurance Company and Mitsubishi Trust and Banking Corporation, as a way to continue growing without expanding the firm. Harmon was chairman and CEO of Wertheim Schroder from 1986 until the end of 1995, and was the senior chairman until June 1997. He was on the board of a number of U.S. and U.K. public companies.

=== Export-Import Bank of the United States ===
On May 6, 1997, President Bill Clinton nominated Harmon for president and chairman of the Export-Import Bank of the United States, which makes billions in loan guarantees to developing nations to purchase goods and services from the US. The US Senate confirmed the nomination on June 12, 1997. At the time, there was an emerging markets crisis, fueled by the collapse of Thailand’s currency, which affected other countries in the region, and large credit defaults in Russia and Latin America. Harmon was confident that the emerging markets economy would soon recover. Due to these market conditions during Harmon’s tenure, the focus of the bank’s loan guarantees went from government-related to private ventures. Harmon’s term was to end in January 2001 but he was asked to extend his term through May 2001 by Vice President Dick Cheney.

=== Caravel Management LLC ===
His stint as head of the Ex-Im Bank was Harmon’s introduction to frontier markets. In October 2004, Harmon founded Caravel Management, where he was chairman and chief investment officer. The New York-based firm invested in special situations in frontier and emerging markets.

=== World Resources Institute ===
In 2004, Harmon was elected chairman of the World Resources Institute (WRI), an independent nonprofit organization founded in 1982, focused on global environmental policy research and analysis. WRI has over 1400 employees, and in addition to its main office in Washington, DC, WRI maintains offices in China, India, Indonesia, Mexico, Ethiopia, Brazil and a European headquarters in The Hague.

=== Egyptian-American Enterprise Fund ===
Following the 2011 Egyptian revolution, President Barack Obama pledged $1 billion in economic aid to Egypt. In July 2012, then-Secretary of State Hillary Clinton traveled to Egypt to meet newly elected President Mohamed Morsi. During this visit, Clinton announced that Harmon would head the new Egyptian-American Enterprise Fund ("EAEF"). Secretary of State John Kerry announced in March 2013 that the Egyptian-American Enterprise Fund would be launched by the US. In an effort to boost Egypt's ailing economy, the fund was to invest in small- and medium-sized Egyptian businesses. The fund was officially launched on April 24, 2013. In 2015, the EAEF made its first two major investments in Fawry, an electronic payments platform and Sarwa Capital, a consumer finance company, which help to promote financial inclusion in Egypt.

In June 2017, Harmon testified before the House Foreign Affairs Committee about the achievements of EAEF to date, offering praise for Egypt's economic reform agenda, and encouraging Congress to explore how enterprise funds can be incorporated into the U.S. foreign policy apparatus.^{[} He reiterated these comments in an op-ed later that summer when members of Congress and the Trump administration considered cutting foreign aid to Egypt over human rights concerns. In the EAEF's 2017 annual report, Harmon stated that the “EAEF has invested 180 million and grown its portfolio to include four private companies and three investment funds….[and] attracted an additional USD 130 million from foreign institutional investors, doubling the impact of our efforts….and created more than 500 jobs.” Congress has authorized $300 million for investment in the Fund.

In August 2018, the Center for Strategic and International Studies ("CSIS") released a report, entitled "Time for a Third Wave of Enterprise Funds," which highlighted the success of the Egyptian American Enterprise Fund and advocated for a new set of enterprise funds to be created in Central America, southeast Asia and sub-Saharan Africa.

In April 2019, David Ignatius of the Washington Post, published an opinion piece on the EAEF, "The story of a private-equity fund shows how a U.S.-Egypt reset could begin."

=== Politics ===
Harmon was finance chairman for incumbent New York Mayor David Dinkins’ unsuccessful 1993 campaign for reelection. Harmon was Dinkins’ second-highest fundraiser, raising $155,300 for the mayor's campaign. Harmon helped raise over $100,000 for President Bill Clinton’s successful 1996 campaign for reelection.

=== Other work ===
In 1976, Harmon was appointed a director of Questar Corporation, an energy company focused on natural gas production and distribution. He resigned in 1997 in order to head the Export-Import Bank of the United States. In 2001, after completing his term with the bank, he was reappointed as a Questar director. In 2010, Questar spun off exploration and production businesses, Questar Market Resources, to QEP Resources. Harmon was on the board of QEP until May 2011 when he stepped down.

In the 1980s, he was on the board of film production company Orion Pictures, and, prior to its 1987 merger with Warner Music, Harmon was chairman of Chappell Music.

In 1995, he became chairman of a newly formed company, Latin Communications Group Inc., which invested in the Spanish language daily El Diario, with an aim at purchasing additional Spanish-language media outlets. Latin Communications Group was purchased by Entravision Communications in 1999.

In 2001, he founded Harmon & Co., a financial advisory firm providing services globally to private and public institutions. He is the company's chairman.

From 2002 to 2003, Harmon was chairman of the Corporate Council on Africa (CCA), a nonprofit that promotes trade and investment between the United States and Africa. While he was chairman the CCA partnered with the Council on Foreign Relations (of which he is a member), the Institute for International Economics and the Joint Center for Political and Economic Studies, to launch the Commission on Capital Flows to Africa. He chaired the commission that presented its final report to the US government in June 2003.

He was a member of the World Panel on Financing Water Infrastructure, formed by the Global Water Partnership, the Read the user guideWorld Water Council and the 3rd World Water Forum in Kyoto, Japan, to consider solutions to global water needs. He was also a member of the Advisory Committee on International Capital Markets; the nominating committee of the Board of the New York Stock Exchange; and the board of directors of the Securities Industry Association.

In 2009, he established the Harmon Family Professorship of Africana Studies at Brown University, his alma mater. Harmon is a trustee emeritus of Brown University and Barnard College. He was a member of the boards of directors of the School of International and Public Affairs at Columbia University; and was a member of the boards of directors of the Center for Global Development in Washington, DC, and Africare.

He was the U.S. representative on the 2011 High Level Panel for Infrastructure Investment, a panel appointed by the finance ministers and central bank governors of the G20 summit in France. The purpose of the panel was to make recommendations for the summit regarding worldwide financing and infrastructure needs.

=== Publications ===
In 2021, Harmon published a memoir, Up and Doing: Two Presidents, Three Mistakes, and One Great Weekend--Touchpoints to a Better World. In 2026, he coauthored another book, A Daring Enterprise: A US-Egyptian Partnership and the Case for Soft Power that was published by the American University in Cairo Press.
