= James H. Lambright =

American businessman

James H. Lambright was the 22nd Chairman of the Export-Import Bank of the United States (Ex-Im), an agency of the United States government.

Lambright, born in St. Louis, Missouri, graduated with honors from Harvard Law School. He also studied linguistics at Stanford University and received a Bachelor of Arts. He also is a Henry Crown Fellow of the Aspen Institute.

He was vice president of Credit Suisse First Boston in Los Angeles and joined Ex-Im in 2001 to become its executive vice president and chief operating officer. He was nominated chairman by George W. Bush on February 13, 2006, and sworn in on July 31. His term ended on January 20, 2009.

Mr. Lambright was tapped by Treasury Secretary Henry Paulson to serve as its interim Chief Investment Officer for the Troubled Asset Relief Program.
