= Kimberly A. Reed =

American government employee (born 1971)

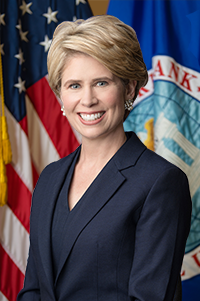
- Official portrait, 2019

Chairman and President of the Export–Import Bank of the United States
- In office May 9, 2019 – January 20, 2021
- President: Donald Trump
- Preceded by: Fred Hochberg
- Succeeded by: Reta Jo Lewis

Personal details
- Born: March 11, 1971 (age 54) Buckhannon, West Virginia, U.S.
- Party: Republican
- Education: West Virginia Wesleyan College (BA); West Virginia University (JD)

Kimberly Ann Reed (born March 11, 1971) is an American attorney who served as the chairman and President of the Export–Import Bank of the United States from 2019 to 2021. She was sworn in on May 9, 2019.

Environmental groups have criticized Reed for her role in approving the Export-Import Bank's provision of over $5 billion for fossil fuel projects they say will emit millions of tons of carbon dioxide annually, displace local communities, and have a historically high rate of worker fatalities.

Reed previously served as a senior advisor to Treasury Secretaries John W. Snow and Henry Paulson.

Reed headed the United States delegation to the inauguration ceremony of South African President Cyril Ramaphosa in Pretoria on May 28, 2019.

== Early life and education ==
Reed is a native of Buckhannon, West Virginia. Her father Terry Reed was a special assistant to the late Republican Governor Arch Moore. She has a brother and two sisters.

Reed earned her undergraduate degree from West Virginia Wesleyan College and a J.D. degree from West Virginia University College of Law. While she was an undergraduate, Reed interned for The Heritage Foundation.
