= Export–Import Bank of the United States =

American public bank

Agency overview
- Formed: February 2, 1934; 92 years ago
- Headquarters: Lafayette Building Washington, D.C.
- Employees: 370 (2018)
- Annual budget: $154 million (FY 2026)
- Agency executive: John Jovanovic, President and Chair of the Board of Directors
- Website: exim.gov

Export-Import Bank Act of 1945
- Long title: An Act to provide for increasing the lending authority of the Export-Import Bank of Washington, and for other purposes.
- Enacted by: the 79th United States Congress

Citations
- Public law: Pub. L. 79-173
- Statutes at Large: 59 Stat. 526

Legislative history
- Introduced in the House as H.R. 3771 by Brent Spence on July 12, 1945; Signed into law by President Harry S. Truman on July 31, 1945

The Export–Import Bank of the United States (EXIM) is the official export credit agency (ECA) of the United States federal government. Operating as a wholly owned federal government corporation, the bank "assists in financing and facilitating U.S. exports of goods and services", particularly when private sector lenders are unable or unwilling to provide financing. Its current chairman and president, John Jovanovic took office as chair and president on September 19, 2025.

The Export–Import Bank was established in 1934 as the Export-Import Bank of Washington by an executive order of President Franklin D. Roosevelt. Its stated goal was "to aid in financing and to facilitate exports and imports and the exchange of commodities between the United States and other Nations or the agencies or nationals thereof." The bank's first transaction was a $3.8 million loan to Cuba in 1935 for the purchase of U.S. silver ingots. In 1945, it was made an independent agency within the executive branch by the United States Congress.

Under federal law, the EXIM must be reauthorized by Congress every four to five years. Following a brief lapse in Congressional authorization on July 1, 2015, which prevented the bank from engaging in new business, it was reauthorized through September 2019 via the Fixing America's Surface Transportation Act of December 2015. In December 2019, President Donald Trump signed the Export-Import Bank Extension into law as part of the Further Consolidated Appropriations Act, 2020, which authorized the bank until December 31, 2026.

Over its lifetime, the Export-Import Bank has helped finance several historic projects including the Pan-American Highway, the Burma Road, and post-World War II reconstruction. While supporters argue that the bank allows small and medium-sized businesses to participate in the global market, critics allege that it shows favoritism to large corporations and special interests.

== Overview ==
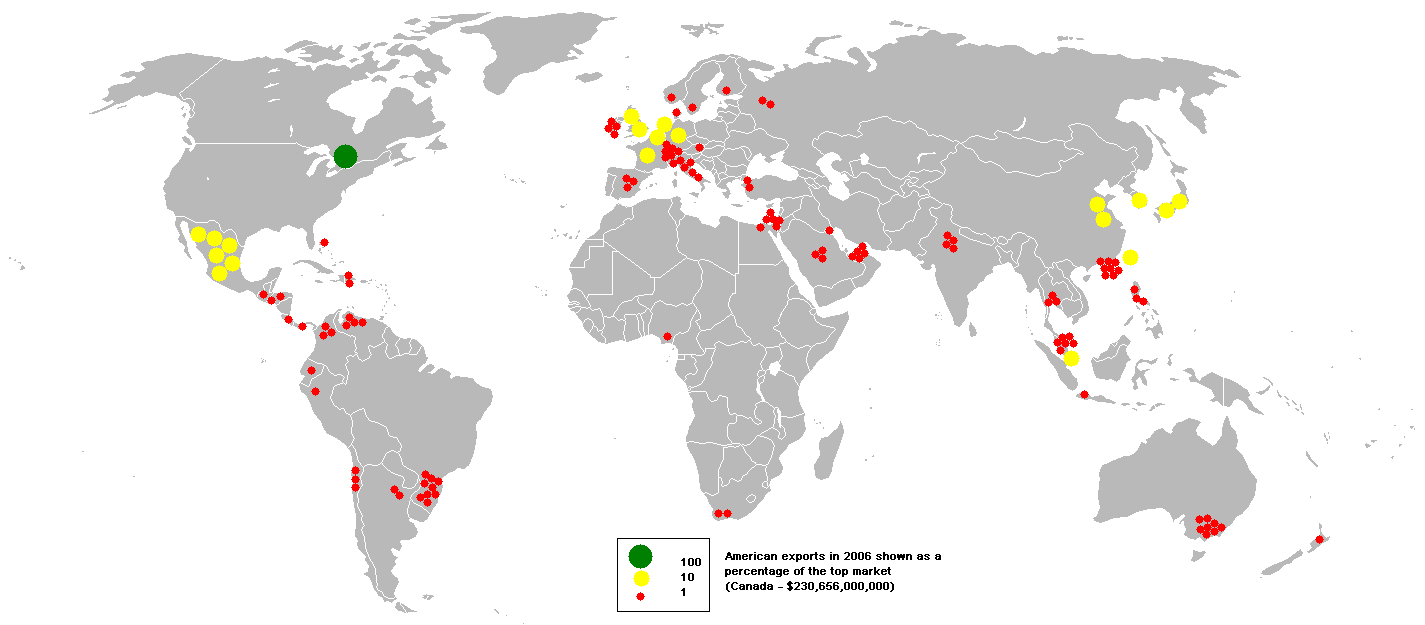
US exports during 2006

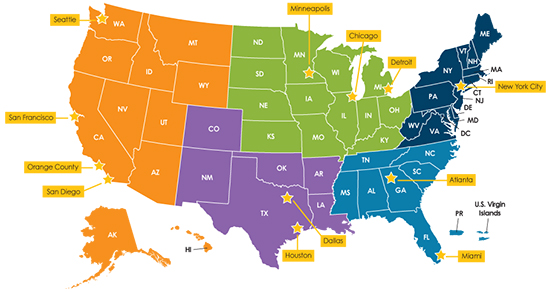
Export–Import Bank of the United States Regional Export Centers

The Export–Import Bank of the United States (EXIM) is a government agency that provides a variety of tools intended to aid the export of American goods and services. The mission of the Bank is to create and sustain U.S. jobs by financing sales of U.S. exports to international buyers. EXIM equips U.S. exporters and their customers with tools such as buyer financing, export credit insurance, and access to working capital. Second, when U.S. exporters face foreign competition backed by other governments, EXIM provides buyer financing to match or counter the financing offered by almost 96 export credit agencies (ECAs) around the world.

The Bank is chartered as a government corporation by the Congress of the United States. The Charter details the Bank's authorities and limitations. Among them is the principle that EXIM does not compete with private sector lenders, but rather provides financing for transactions that would otherwise not occur because commercial lenders are either unable or unwilling to accept the political or commercial risk inherent in the deal.

The EXIM's products are intended to assist export sales for any American export company regardless of size. The bank's charter provides that EXIM makes available "not less than 20%" of its lending authority to small businesses although they have often fallen short of the 20% threshold. In fiscal year 2013 however, 76% of the value of loans and guarantees went to the top 10 recipients.

Similar banks, known generally as export credit agencies (ECAs), are operated by 60 foreign countries. As the United States is a member of the Organisation for Economic Co-operation and Development (OECD) they conduct their activities by obeying OECD rules and principles. The goal is to permit exporters in various countries to compete on the basis of the quality of their goods and services, not on preferential financing terms. ECAs of countries which are not participants of the OECD, such as the China Exim Bank are not required by their governments to follow OECD rules.

== Leadership ==
The board of directors of the Export–Import Bank of the United States includes five members. The president of the bank serves as chairman, and the first vice president serves as vice chairman. The remaining three members are appointed by the president of the United States with the advice and consent of the Senate. No more than three members may belong to the same political party. At least one member must be chosen from the small business community. Directors serve staggered four-year terms and may remain in office after their term expires until a successor is appointed, but not for more than six additional months.

The United States Trade Representative and the Secretary of Commerce shall serve, ex officio and without vote, as additional members of the Board of Directors of the Bank.

=== Board of Directors ===
The current board members as of May 24, 2026:

Position	Name	Party	Took office	Term expiration
President and Chair	John Jovanovic	Republican	September 19, 2025	January 20, 2029
Vice President and Vice Chair	James G. Burrows, Jr. (acting)	—N/a	February 28, 2025	—
Member	Spencer Bachus	Republican	May 8, 2019	January 20, 2027
Member	Vacant	—	—	January 20, 2027
Member	Vacant	—	—	January 20, 2029
Secretary of Commerce ex officio (non-voting)	Howard Lutnick	Republican	February 21, 2025	—
U.S. Trade Representative ex officio (non-voting)	Jamieson Greer	Republican	February 27, 2025	—

=== Nominations ===
President Trump has nominated the following to fill seats on the board. They await Senate confirmation.

Position	Name	Party	Term expires	Replacing
Vice President and Vice Chair	David Slade	Republican	January 20, 2029	Judith Pryor
Member	Michael Rigas	Republican	January 20, 2027	Spencer Bachus
Member	Michael Rigas	Republican	January 20, 2031	Reappointment

List of EXIM chairmen and presidents
- R. Walton Moore, (chairman) 1934–1941
- George N. Peek, (President) 1934–1935
- R. Walton Moore, (chairman) 1934–1941
- Warren Lee Pierson, (President) 1936–1945
- Wayne Chatfield-Taylor, (President) 1945
- Jesse H. Jones, (chairman) 1941–1943
- Leo T. Crowley, (chairman) 1943–1945
- William McC. Martin, Jr., (chairman) 1946–1949
- Herbert E. Gaston, (chairman) 1949–1953
- Glen E. Edgerton, (chairman) 1953–1953
- Glen E. Edgerton, (chairman) 1954–1955
- Lynn U. Strambaugh, (Vice Chairman) 1954–1960
- Samuel C. Waugh, (chairman) 1955–1961
- Tom Killefer, (Vice Chairman) 1960–1962
- Harold F. Linder, (chairman) 1961–1968
- Walter C. Sauer, (Vice Chairman) 1962–1976
- Henry Kearns, (chairman) 1969–1973
- William J. Casey, (chairman) 1974–1976
- Stephen M. DuBrul Jr., (chairman) 1976–1977
- Delio E. Gianturco, (Vice Chairman) 1976–1977
- John L. Moore, Jr., (chairman) 1977–1981
- H. K. Allen, (Vice Chairman) 1978–1981
- William H. Draper III, (chairman) 1981–1986
- Charles E. Lord, (Vice Chairman) 1982–1983
- John A. Bohn Jr., (Vice Chairman) 1984–1986
- John A. Bohn Jr., (chairman) 1986–1989
- William F. Ryan, (Vice Chairman) 1986–1989
- John D. Macomber, (chairman) 1989–1992
- Eugene K. Lawson, (Vice Chairman) 1989–1993
- Rita M. Rodriguez, (Acting Chairman) 1993–1993
- Kenneth D. Brody, (chairman) 1993–1995
- Martin A. Kamarck, (Vice Chairman) 1993–1996
- Martin A. Kamarck, (chairman) 1996–1997
- Rita M. Rodriguez, (Acting Chairman) 1997–1997
- James A. Harmon, (chairman) 1997–2001
- Jackie M. Clegg, (Vice Chairman) 1997–2001
- John E. Robson, (chairman) 2001–2002
- Eduardo Aguirre, (Vice Chairman) 2001–2003
- Philip Merrill, (chairman) 2002–2005
- April Foley, (Vice Chairman) 2003–2005
- James H. Lambright, (chairman) 2005–2009
- Linda M. Conlin, (Vice Chairman 2006–2009)
- Wanda Felton, (Vice Chairman) 2011–2013, 2014–2016
- John A. McAdams, (Acting Vice Chairman) 2013
- Fred P. Hochberg, (chairman) 2009–2017
- Charles J. Hall, (Acting Vice Chairman) 2016–2017 (Acting Chairman) 2017
- Scott Schloegel, (Acting Vice Chairman) 2017–2019
- Jeffrey Gerrish, (Acting Chairman) 2018–2019
- Kimberly A. Reed, (chairman) 2019–2021
- James G. Burrows Jr., (Acting Chairman) 2021–2022
- Reta Jo Lewis, (chairman) 2022–2025
- Spencer Bachus, (Acting Chairman) 2025
- John Jovanovic, (chairman) 2025–

List of EXIM directors
- William McC. Martin, Jr. 1945–1946
- Clarence E. Gauss 1946–1952
- Wilson L. Townsend 1952–1953
- Hawthorne Arey 1949–1953
- Hawthorne Arey 1954–1961
- George A. Blowers 1954–1961
- Vance Brand 1954–1959
- James S. Bush 1959–1963
- George Docking 1961–1964
- Charles M. Meriwether 1961–1965
- Elizabeth S. May 1964–1969
- Hobart Taylor, Jr. 1965–1968
- Tom Lilley 1965–1972
- John C. Clark 1969–1976
- R. Alex McCullough 1969–1977
- Mitchell P. Kobelinski 1973–1976
- Margaret W. Kahliff 1976–1982
- Donald E. Stingel 1977–1981
- Thibaut de Saint Phalle 1977–1981
- Richard W. Heldridge 1982–1988
- Rita M. Rodriguez 1982–1999
- James E. Yonge 1982–1984
- Richard H. Hughes 1985–1985
- Simon C. Fireman 1986–1989
- Richard Houseworth 1988–1991
- Constance B. Harriman 1991–1994
- Cecil B. Thompson 1991–1994
- Maria Luisa Haley 1994–1999
- Julie Belaga 1994–1999
- Dan Renberg 1999–2003
- Dorian Vanessa Weaver 1999–2003
- Max Cleland 2003–2007
- Linda M. Conlin 2004–2006
- J. Joseph Grandmaison 2006–2009
- Bijan R. Kian 2006–2011
- Diane Farrell 2007–2011
- Larry Walther 2011–2013
- Wanda Felton 2011–2013, 2014–2016
- Fred P. Hochberg 2009–2017
- Sean Robert Mulvaney 2011–2015
- Patricia M. Loui 2011–2015
- Charles J. Hall 2016–2017

== History ==
=== Early history (1934–1944) ===
The Export–Import Bank was originally established as a District of Columbia banking corporation by Executive Order 6581, issued by President Franklin D. Roosevelt on February 2, 1934. It was initially named the Export–Import Bank of Washington. The stated goal was "to aid in financing and to facilitate exports and imports and the exchange of commodities between the United States and other Nations or the agencies or nationals thereof", with the immediate goal of making loans to the USSR and Latin America. Roosevelt created a Second Export–Import Bank of Washington with Executive Order 6638 on March 9, 1934, with the specific goal of aiding trade with Cuba. The Bank's first transaction was a $3.8 million loan to Cuba in 1935 for the purchase of U.S. silver ingots. The First and Second Export–Import Banks were combined in 1936 when Congress transferred the obligations of the Second Export–Import Bank to the first.

=== Independent agency (since 1945) ===
Congress made the bank an independent agency on July 31, 1945, with the Export–Import Bank Act of 1945. On March 13, 1968, further legislation changed the name to "Export–Import Bank of the United States". EXIM became a self-sustaining (self-funding) agency in 2007, though the loans remain backed by the government.

The Government Corporation Control Act of 1945 requires the Bank to be reauthorized by Congress every four to five years. Reauthorizations have been approved several times:

Bill name	Date signed into law	Bank authorized until
S. 3938	December 20, 2006	May 30, 2012
H.R. 2072	May 30, 2012	September 30, 2014
H.J.Res. 124	September 19, 2014	June 30, 2015
H.R. 22	December 4, 2015	September 30, 2019
H.R. 1865	December 20, 2019	December 31, 2026

It was last chartered for a three-year term in 2012 and in September 2014 was extended through June 30, 2015. Congressional authorization for the bank lapsed as of July 1, 2015. As a result, the bank could not engage in new business, but it continued to manage its existing loan portfolio. Five months later, after the successful employment of the rarely used discharge petition procedure in the House of Representatives, Congress reauthorized the bank until September 2019 via the Fixing America's Surface Transportation Act signed into law on December 4, 2015, by President Barack Obama. In December 2019, President Donald Trump signed the Export-Import Bank Extension into law as part of the Further Consolidated Appropriations Act, 2020 (P.L. 116–94) which authorized the bank until December 31, 2026.

EXIM institution the China and Transformational Exports program in an effort to assist American exporters in competing with Chinese companies and to maintain American advantages in specified industries.

== Projects ==
=== Pan-American Highway ===
The Pan-American Highway, a network of roads, runs from Alaska to Chile through 14 countries with important transportation links to nearly all of continental Latin America. Construction of the highway began in 1936 and was completed in 1980.

EXIM credits and loans supported construction of the Pan-American Highway in various central and South American countries. In Paraguay, Argentina, and Bolivia, EXIM supported the construction of highway spurs connected to the Pan-American Highway. The agency approved twenty credits to U.S. companies to support highway construction.

=== Burma Road ===
Constructed between 1937 and 1938, the 717-mile Burma Road links Lashio in present-day Myanmar (previously Burma) to Kunming in Yunnan Province, China.

In December 1938, EXIM approved a $25 million credit to support China during World War II. The funds helped keep a key supply route open by providing transportation vehicles, support materials, and purchasing power. An additional $20 million to the Universal Trading Corporation was approved in 1940. A 1939 journal article in Foreign Affairs noted that China used part of the $25 million to purchase 2,000 three-ton trucks from U.S. automakers.

=== Post-WWII reconstruction and the Marshall Plan ===
The bank played a significant role in the period between the end of Lend-Lease in September 1945 and the launch of the Marshall Plan and the World Bank’s first authorizations between 1947 and 1948. At the close of World War II, the United States lacked a credit institution equipped to meet the anticipated postwar demand. The Export–Import Bank Act of 1945, which remains the foundation of EXIM’s current charter, was enacted to expand the bank’s lending capacity in response to Europe’s reconstruction needs. The bank’s 1945 annual report described EXIM as the main source of long-term dollar loans, due to low private interest in foreign lending and delays in setting up international financial institutions like the International Monetary Fund and the World Bank. The Export–Import Bank Act of 1945 raised the bank’s lending authority from $750 million to $3.5 billion, nearly quadrupling it to address these gaps.

In 1945 and 1946 credit was offered to France, Denmark, Norway, Belgium, the Netherlands, Turkey, Czechoslovakia, Finland, Italy, Ethiopia, Greece, Poland and Austria to purchase equipment, facilities, and services from the United States. The financing was designed to aid reconstruction of the nations and to repair their import and export capability through the purchase of new machinery, currency exchange, and improvements and repairs to infrastructure and transportation systems.

When the Marshall Plan began in 1948, the Export–Import Bank focused its lending on countries in North and South America that were not part of the Economic Recovery Act.

=== First credits to post-Soviet nations ===
After the fall of the Berlin Wall in 1989 and the dissolution of the Soviet Union in 1991, U.S. companies were able to resume business with Eastern Europe. EXIM was among the first financial institutions to provide export financing to the former Soviet Union, Poland, Czechoslovakia, and the newly independent states that emerged after 1991. In 1990, President George H. W. Bush waived the Jackson–Vanik amendment, which had restricted normal trade with communist countries since 1975. The waiver allowed the bank to offer guarantees and insurance programs to U.S. companies doing business with the Soviet Union and several former communist countries.

The Export–Import Bank resumed business with Czechoslovakia in March 1990. On January 25, 1991, it approved its first transaction with the country since 1947. Backed by First Interstate Bank of Los Angeles, the guarantee enabled Tonak Hat Company to purchase computers from Digital Equipment Corporation of Massachusetts. Since 1991, EXIM has supported exports to 25 countries that emerged after the fall of the Iron Curtain.

=== First credit to India ===
Following a visit to India in January 2015, President Barack Obama announced several U.S. investment commitments. The Export–Import Bank would finance $1 billion in exports of U.S.-made products, the Overseas Private Investment Corporation would lend $1 billion to small and medium-sized rural businesses, and the U.S. Trade and Development Agency would commit $2 billion to renewable energy projects. Obama and Prime Minister Narendra Modi also reached agreements on issues that had previously prevented U.S. companies from building nuclear reactors in India.

== Support ==
Supporters say that the bank emphasizes trying to help small and medium size businesses expand their exporting capabilities. CEO and president of the National Association of Manufacturers Jay Timmons stated: "The EXIM plays a critical role in manufacturer's ability to export to new markets and keep up with growing global competition. The Bank assists nearly 290,000 export related jobs and each year is helping more and more small and medium-sized manufacturers grow their businesses and hire new workers. More than 85% of all EXIM transactions directly benefit small business exporters—the economic engine that powers our economy and job creation."

When Obama was campaigning for president in 2008, he stated that the Export–Import Bank had "become little more than a fund for corporate welfare." During the Bank's reauthorization struggle, May 2012, he said that the Export–Import Bank plays a very important role in reaching his goal of doubling exports over 5 years. At the reauthorization ceremony Obama stated: "We're helping thousands of businesses sell more of their products and services overseas, in the process, we're helping them create jobs here at home. And we're doing it at no extra cost to the taxpayer."

== Criticism ==
=== Special interests-based criticism ===
The Bank has been criticized for favoring special interests. These interests have included corporations such as Boeing or Enron as well as foreign governments and nationals, such as a 1996 $120 million low-interest loan to the China National Nuclear Power Corporation (CNNP) supporting the export of US-made technology.

More recently the bank authorized $33.6 million in loans to Abengoa, a Spanish Green energy company on which former Governor Bill Richardson is a member of the board of directors. As of May 2014, Richardson was also listed as a member of the advisory committee of the Export–Import Bank.

==== Boeing ====
65% of loan guarantees over 2007 and 2008 went to companies purchasing Boeing aircraft. In 2012, the Bank's loan guarantees became even more skewed, with 82 percent of them going to Boeing customers.

However, EXIM supporters note that Boeing is the largest exporter in the United States by dollar value, and must be protected in their capacity as the only remaining comprehensive U.S. commercial aircraft manufacturer. Support of Boeing is seen as particularly critical as Comac, China's state-owned and heavily subsidized commercial aircraft manufacturer, aggressively seeks to leech market share from both Boeing and Airbus. Also important to note, Boeing is not the only US aircraft manufacturer previously supported by EXIM. During the 1930s, 40s, and 50s, EXIM supported other US aviation manufacturers such as the Douglas Aircraft Company, the Consolidated Vultee Aircraft Company (Convair), and the Lockheed Aircraft Corporation.

The cost and effectiveness of the bank are controversial. While the EXIM projects will earn the U.S. government an average of $1.4 billion per year for the next 10 years, an alternative analysis from the Congressional Budget Office found that the program would lose about $2 billion during the same period, partly due to discrepancies in how credit risk is accounted for. Both conservative and liberal groups have been critical of the bank, and some continue to demand its termination.

=== Budget-based criticism ===
Critics also purport the existence of "unseen" costs created by the Export–Import Bank's subsidies, including artificially raising the price of new airplanes and potentially adding $2 billion to the deficit over the next decade.

Forbes contributor Doug Bandow wrote in 2014, "The agency piously claims not to provide subsidies since it charges fees and interest, but it exists only to offer business a better credit deal than is available in the marketplace. The Bank uses its ability to borrow at government rates to provide loans, loan guarantees, working capital guarantees, and loan insurance."

If the normal principles of economics or finance are applied, then it is seen by critics as unlikely that the bank has profited and most unlikely that it makes the annual profit that it has stated, because the bank's calculations of profit fail to make proper adjustment for risk. Best practice in finance and economics, as well as in banking, is to adjust the cost of capital or discount rate to reflect risk, or, equivalently, to use a fair-value estimate. On this basis the criticism is that "This simple approach—which is based on a method outlined in a National Bureau of Economic Research paper by Debbie Lucas of the Massachusetts Institute of Technology—suggests that the EXIM's long-term loan guarantee program actually provides guarantees at a loss for taxpayers, not a profit. Moreover, this analysis reveals that the EXIM's loan guarantees are made at sufficiently generous terms that borrowers receive subsidies of about 1% of the amount borrowed. That translates into a $200 million cost for taxpayers on the $21 billion in loans that the bank will make in 2012."

=== Environment-based criticism ===
In February 2009, the EXIM settled a seven-year-long legal proceeding brought by Friends of the Earth, Greenpeace together with the cities of Boulder, Arcata and Oakland. The plaintiffs said that the EXIM and the Overseas Private Investment Corporation provided financial assistance to oil and other fossil fuel projects without first evaluating the projects' climate change impacts. In 2005, the plaintiffs were granted legal standing to sue. This is considered a landmark decision because it is the first time that a federal court has specifically granted legal standing for a lawsuit exclusively challenging the federal government's failure to evaluate the impacts of its actions on the Earth's climate and U.S. citizens. In its settlement agreement, the EXIM agrees to evaluate the carbon dioxide emissions as part of its determination for qualification for a project. However, EXIM fossil fuel financing and associated greenhouse gas emissions grew swiftly after the settlement agreement, coinciding with Chairman Hochberg's tenure. Between 2009 and 2012, EXIM fossil fuel financing grew from $2.56 billion to nearly $10 billion.

Environmental groups in 2010 said that the EXIM was on a "fossil fuel binge", which "makes a mockery" of President Obama's stated commitment to phase out fossil fuel subsidies. In December 2009, EXIM Directors approved $3 billion in financing for the ExxonMobil-led Papua New Guinea Liquid Gas project in December 2009. The project has reportedly caused violence and in April 2012, the Papua New Guinea government ordered in troops to quell opposition from villagers after a landslide linked to a quarry that had been used by the project killed an estimated 25 people.

In 2010, environmental groups criticized the EXIM Directors for approving $917 million worth of financing for the 3,960 megawatt coal-fired Sasan Ultra Mega Power Project in India after initially rejecting the project on climate change grounds. Environmental groups say that in reversing the decision the agency's Chairman, Fred Hochberg and Board of Directors "caved in" to political pressure from Wisconsin politicians. In 2011, several environmental groups protested at Export–Import Bank headquarters, unsuccessfully urging Chairman Hochberg and Board of Directors to reject $805 million in financing for the 4,800 megawatt Kusile coal-fired power plant in South Africa, which environmental groups say is the largest carbon emitting project in the agency's history, which will not alleviate poverty but will emit excessive local air pollution, which health experts say causes damage the respiratory, cardiovascular, and nervous systems and deaths resulting from heart disease, cancer, stroke, and chronic lower respiratory diseases. EXIM's 2011 announcement of support for Kusile asserted claims of environmental advancements including that "Kusile will be the first coal-fired power plant in South Africa to include sulfur dioxide scrubbers." However, in 2023 the South African energy utility Eskom proposed to circumvent the Kusile sulfur dioxide pollution control system, which the Helsinki-based Centre for Research on Energy and Clean Air estimates could result in 680 deaths.

In December 2012, the Center for Biological Diversity, Pacific Environment, and Turtle Island Restoration Network filed a lawsuit against Chairman Hochberg and the EXIM for the agency's financing of Australia Pacific LNG's liquid natural gas projects inside the Great Barrier Reef World Heritage Area. The lawsuit alleged that EXIM financing for the projects violates U.S. environmental and cultural heritage laws. Their amended lawsuit included EXIM's loan for the Australia Pacific LNG project and a $1.8 billion loan for the Queensland Curtis which together totaled $4.8 billion. In March 2016, a California federal judge ruled against the environmentalists arguing that the EXIM financing represented only 10% of the project which is backed by ConocoPhillips, Origin Energy Ltd. and Sinopec and rejecting the loan would not stop the project. The environmentalists appealed the decision.

In 2019 Friends of the Earth (US) criticized EXIM President Kimberly A Reed for supporting the liquid natural gas (LNG) industry despite the lifecycle climate impacts of the fossil fuel, citing the U.S. government's Fourth National Climate Assessment finding that more frequent and extreme weather events are severely damaging the environment and the economy, while increasing harm to human health and loss of life. Friends of the Earth (US) also criticized EXIM for approving $5 billion in financing the Mozambique LNG project, citing the project's damage to the surrounding ecosystem (including to endangered species), displacement of local communities, and lack of economic benefits for local people.

In May, 2023 EXIM Chair Reta Jo Lewis, Vice Chair Judith Pryor and Director Spencer Bachus voted to approve nearly $100 million in Export-Import Bank financing for an oil refinery expansion project in Indonesia (EXIM Director Owen Herrnstadt abstained). Environmental groups criticize the approval as directly violating President Biden's commitments to end overseas fossil fuel financing, including at the 2021 UN Climate Change Conference. The approval was also repudiated by the White House National Security Council, which stated the "decision does not reflect administration policy."

=== Criticism of green energy-based financings ===
Conversely the EXIM has also faced scrutiny for pursuing green energy projects. The EXIM provided $10 million of loan guarantees in 2011 to Solyndra, a company that ultimately became bankrupt.

== See also ==
- CoBank
- List of export credit agencies
- Independent agencies of the United States government
- List of federal agencies in the United States
- Title 12 of the Code of Federal Regulations
