= Citymeals-on-Wheels =

Nonprofit organization in New York City

Citymeals on Wheels
- Formation: 1981; 45 years ago
- Founder: Gael Greene, James Beard
- Type: Non-profit organization
- Location: New York City
- Region served: New York City
- Members: 18,000
- Executive director: Beth Shapiro
- Budget: $20 million
- Staff: 30
- Volunteers: 15,000
- Website: Citymeals.org

Citymeals on Wheels, also called Citymeals, is a Meals on Wheels-type nonprofit organization in New York City that raises private funds to provide prepared meals and social support to homebound elderly residents of New York City.

== History ==
Gael Greene and James Beard founded Citymeals on Wheels in 1981 to supplement the government's meal delivery program. Greene had the idea after reading a newspaper article about homebound elderly New Yorkers with nothing to eat on weekends and holidays. Greene approached Beard with the idea, and the two raised money to provide Christmas dinners for 6,000 needy elderly at a cost of $35,000. The success of the program inspired them to continue the following year.

Citymeals has an annual budget of $20 million and had 15,412 volunteers in 2016. The majority of the organization's funding comes from donations from private individuals.

The current executive director is Beth Shapiro, who took over from founding director Marcia Stein in 2011.

On October 29, 2018 Citymeals celebrated the opening of the Joan & Bob Tisch Emergency Meal Distribution Center in Hunts Point, Bronx. Use of the 30,000 foot warehouse was planned in the aftermath of Hurricane Sandy in New York, to help Citymeals deal with increased demand during future emergencies.

Citymeals provides around 2 million meals annually, and as of March 2020 has distributed around 60 million meals since its founding in 1981.

=== COVID-19 Response ===
Citymeals doubled its staff in March 2020 in order to provide food for increasing numbers of homebound and at risk senior citizens during the COVID-19 pandemic in New York. The organization began producing 250,000 meals in the three weeks of the pandemic, with plans to sustain increased meal production. Citymeals began working with 250 meal delivery centers in New York, whereas previously the organization had partners with 30 delivery centers.

== Services ==
Citymeals provides free meal delivery to elderly residents of New York living without food security, and also performs wellness checks on these individuals. The organization contracts with local meal centers to prepare and deliver meals on Saturdays and Sundays, as government funding only covers weekday meals and does not cover holidays. Friendly visiting is also an important part of the Citymeals mission, and volunteer groups spend social time with isolated elderly to help their loneliness.

=== Holiday Meals ===
Citymeals funding allows government centers to remain open on holidays for those who are able to walk in and volunteers deliver meals to the homebound. Citymeals funds holiday meals for Rosh Hashanah, Thanksgiving, Chanukah, New Year’s Day and Easter.

=== Holiday Food Boxes ===
When local meal centers close throughout the year for holiday observances, Citymeals will guarantee that homebound clients have food. Boxes of shelf-stable foods such as canned tuna and chicken, shelf-stable milk, cookie, crackers and juices are provided. Citymeals provides holiday boxes for Labor Day, Season’s Greetings, Martin Luther King, Jr. Day, Passover, Memorial Day and Independence Day.

=== Emergency boxes ===
Emergency boxes containing non-perishable food out to homebound elderly clients in late fall to provide security through the winter months. Clients are encouraged to keep some food on hand in case a winter weather emergency keeps regular meals deliveries from getting to them. The additional emergency food packages are sent quarterly to recipients on wait lists and/or second meals clients.

=== Supper Meals ===
A joint study between Citymeals on Wheels and Cornell University found that 14% of Citymeals’ clients relied on the program as their sole source of food. These individuals did not have the means to supplement their one daily home-delivered meal. Citymeals delivers supper meals to these elderly who are the poorest, frailest and most isolated.

== See also ==
- Hunger in the United States
- Malnutrition in the United States
- City Harvest
- God's Love We Deliver
- Taste of Tennis, a donor
