= The Supply Chain Resilience Initiative =

Trade agreement between India, Japan and Australia

The Supply Chain Resilience Initiative (SCRI) is a trilateral agreement that was launched following a videoconference between trade ministers of India, Japan and Australia on 27 April 2021 during the COVID-19 pandemic. Vulnerabilities in the global supply chain were revealed as a piece to the puzzle in light of reliance on China. For this reason, Japan, Australia and India are seeking to reduce dependency on China. The goal of this Indo-Pacific initiative is to create a "virtuous cycle" of strong, sustainable, balanced and inclusive growth throughout the Indo-Pacific region by sharing best practices, investment promotion and buyer-seller matching events for supply chain diversification. The Ministers agreed to convene at least once a year to provide guidance to the implementation of the SCRI as well as to consult on how to develop the Initiative. This initiative would likely promote inward investment into Indian manufacturing by Japanese and Australian corporations to attempt a reduction of reliance on Chinese natural resources exports. The Indian government is allegedly focusing on this initiative in light of China's military presence in Ladakh, which has raised tensions between the two countries. The SCRI was formed in light of India's military taking emergency measures to reinforce their border and secure their independence as a superpower. Political talks including the United States 46th President Biden and the Indo-Pacific group of India, Australia and Japan are known as the Quad. The Quad has intensified their discussions on security and ties into a formal alliance as tensions with China continue.

China has been the top import-export destination for both Australia and Japan, as well as India's top import market. Trade ministers of India, Japan and Australia formally launched the Supply Chain Resilience Initiative (SCRI) after continued virtual conferences between the three countries starting September 2020. These meetings developed into the initiative of the SCRI to build a "free, fair, inclusive, non-discriminatory, transparent, predictable and stable trade and investment environment and in keeping its markets open". This agreement is likely an offshoot of security talks that have intensified between these three countries since 2015 as they have all faced political and economic risks with China. The goal is to preserve regional order while balancing Chinese dominance to ensure more robust and diverse supply chains and integrate approaches to defense and security.

On 1 October 2020, the Australian Government announced a new $107.2 million Supply Chain Resilience Initiative (SCRI) to help position Australia to better respond to future crises such as COVID-19.

Japan allocated US$2.2 billion as part of its coronavirus stimulus package to encourage the return of Japanese manufacturing businesses from China to broaden supply sources and improve domestic production. This move reinforces the India and Japan Vision 2025: Special Strategic and Global Partnership Working Together for Peace and Prosperity of the Indo-Pacific Region and the World.
