= John D. Macomber =

American banker (1928–2024)

John Dewitt Macomber
- Born: January 13, 1928; Rochester, New York, U.S.
- Died: August 2, 2024 (aged 96); Washington D.C., U.S.
- Education: Philips Academy; Yale University (BA); Harvard Business School (MBA)
- Occupations: President of the Ex-Im Bank; CEO of Celanese
- Political party: Republican Party
- Board member of: Lehman Brothers; Bristol-Myers Squibb Company; The Brown Group; Chase Manhattan Bank; RJR Nabisco; Pilkington; Xerox Corporation; Rand McNally; Lincoln Center; International Chamber of Commerce; Atlantic Council; Philips Academy

John Dewitt Macomber (January 13, 1928 – August 2, 2024) was an American banker. He was the principal of JDM Investment Group and was the president of the Export-Import Bank of the United States from 1989 to 1992.

== Career ==
Macomber was a senior partner at McKinsey & Co. until 1973 and chairman and CEO of Celanese Corporation from 1973 until 1986. He exited when the company was acquired by Hoechst AG to become the largest chemical company. Celanese had been ahead of its time in stock buybacks, and Macomber was especially proud that 20% of company stock was "owned by middle managers and ordinary folk who are extraordinarily well off". During the 13 years he led the company, the stock increased in value by 10 times, from $24.50 to $245.

Macomber was also chairman of the Council for Excellence in Government, Rand McNally and Company, and vice chairman of the Atlantic Council. He also served on the board of directors of Lehman Brothers, Bristol-Myers Squibb Company, The Brown Group, Inc., Chase Manhattan Bank, RJR Nabisco, Pilkington Ltd., and Xerox Corporation. In addition, Macomber served on the Lincoln Center board and the International Chamber of Commerce.

== Personal life and death ==
Macomber was born in Rochester, New York, and served in the US Air Force for two years. He had two older brothers, William Butts Macomber and Robert Macomber. He graduated from Phillips Academy, Yale University in 1950, and Harvard Business School in 1952. Macomber died in Washington D.C. on August 2, 2024, at the age of 96.
