= William Eldridge Odom =

United States Army general (1932–2008)

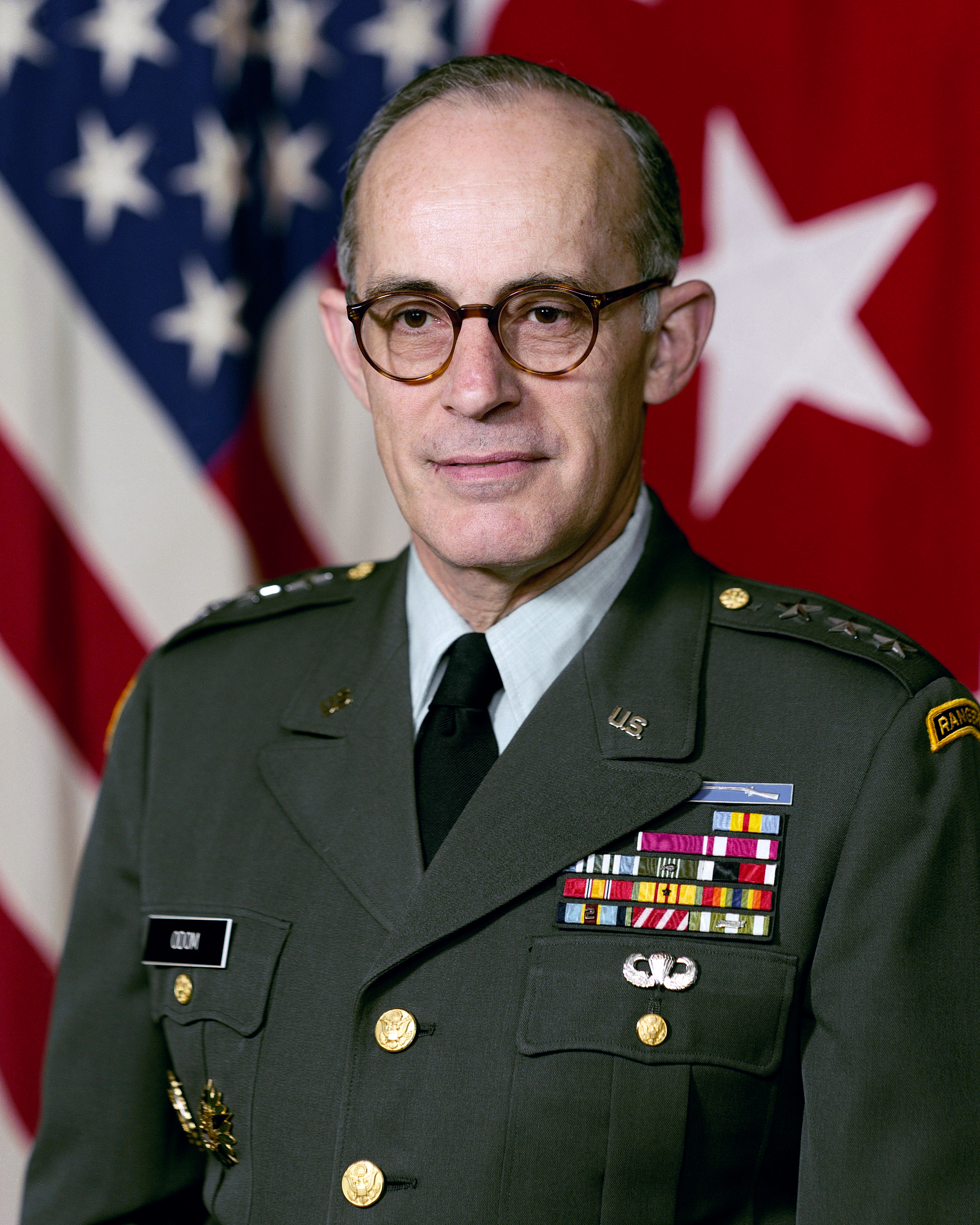
- Official portrait, 1984
- Born: June 23, 1932; Cookeville, Tennessee, US
- Died: May 30, 2008 (aged 75); Lincoln, Vermont, US
- Military career
- Allegiance: United States
- Branch: United States Army
- Service years: 1954–1988
- Rank: Lieutenant General
- Commands: National Security Agency
- Conflicts: Vietnam War
- Awards: Army Distinguished Service Medal; Defense Superior Service Medal; Legion of Merit
- Other work: Senior Fellow, Hudson Institute; Adjunct professor, Yale University; Adjunct professor, Georgetown University

William Eldridge Odom (June 23, 1932 – May 30, 2008) was a United States Army lieutenant general who served as Director of the National Security Agency under President Ronald Reagan, which culminated a 31-year career in military intelligence, mainly specializing in matters relating to the Soviet Union. After his retirement from the military, he became a think tank policy expert and a university professor and became known for his outspoken criticism of the Iraq War and warrantless wiretapping of American citizens. He died of an apparent heart attack at his vacation home in Lincoln, Vermont.

== Military career ==
- 1954 Graduated from the United States Military Academy and was commissioned a second lieutenant.
- 1954–1960, Served in both the United States and West Germany.
- 1962, Earned a master's degree from Columbia University, and married Anne Weld Curtis.
- 1964–1966, Served as part of the U.S. Military Liaison Mission to the Group, Soviet Forces Germany at Potsdam, East Germany.
- 1966–1969, Taught at West Point as an assistant professor of government.
- 1970, Completed a PhD at Columbia.
- 1970–1971, At this point a lieutenant colonel, served in Vietnam, being on the Staff of Plans, Policy, and Programs, and working on the Vietnamization phase of the war.
- 1971–1972, Odom was a visiting scholar at the Research Institute on Communist Affairs at Columbia.
- 1972–1974, U.S. assistant military attaché at the United States embassy in Moscow.
- 1974, Published The Soviet Volunteers: Modernization and Bureaucracy in a Public Mass Organization, (Princeton, N.J.: Princeton University Press, 360 pp.)
- 1974–1975, Associate of the Research Institute on International Change at Columbia
- 1974–1977, Associate professor, Department of Social Science at West Point.
- 1975–1976, Associate member of the Columbia University Seminar on Communism
- 1975–1977, Senior research associate, Research Institute on International Change at Columbia
- 1981, promoted to Major General
- 1977–1981, Military assistant to Zbigniew Brzezinski, the assistant to the president for national security affairs.
- 1981–1985, Assistant chief of staff for intelligence, United States Army.
- 1984, promoted to lieutenant general.
- 1985–1988, Director of the National Security Agency, Fort Meade, Maryland

== Post-military ==
- 1989, Director of national security studies, Hudson Institute, Indianapolis, Indiana
- 1989, Adjunct professor, political science, Yale University, New Haven, Connecticut.
- Extensive publications; see bibliography below

== Biography ==
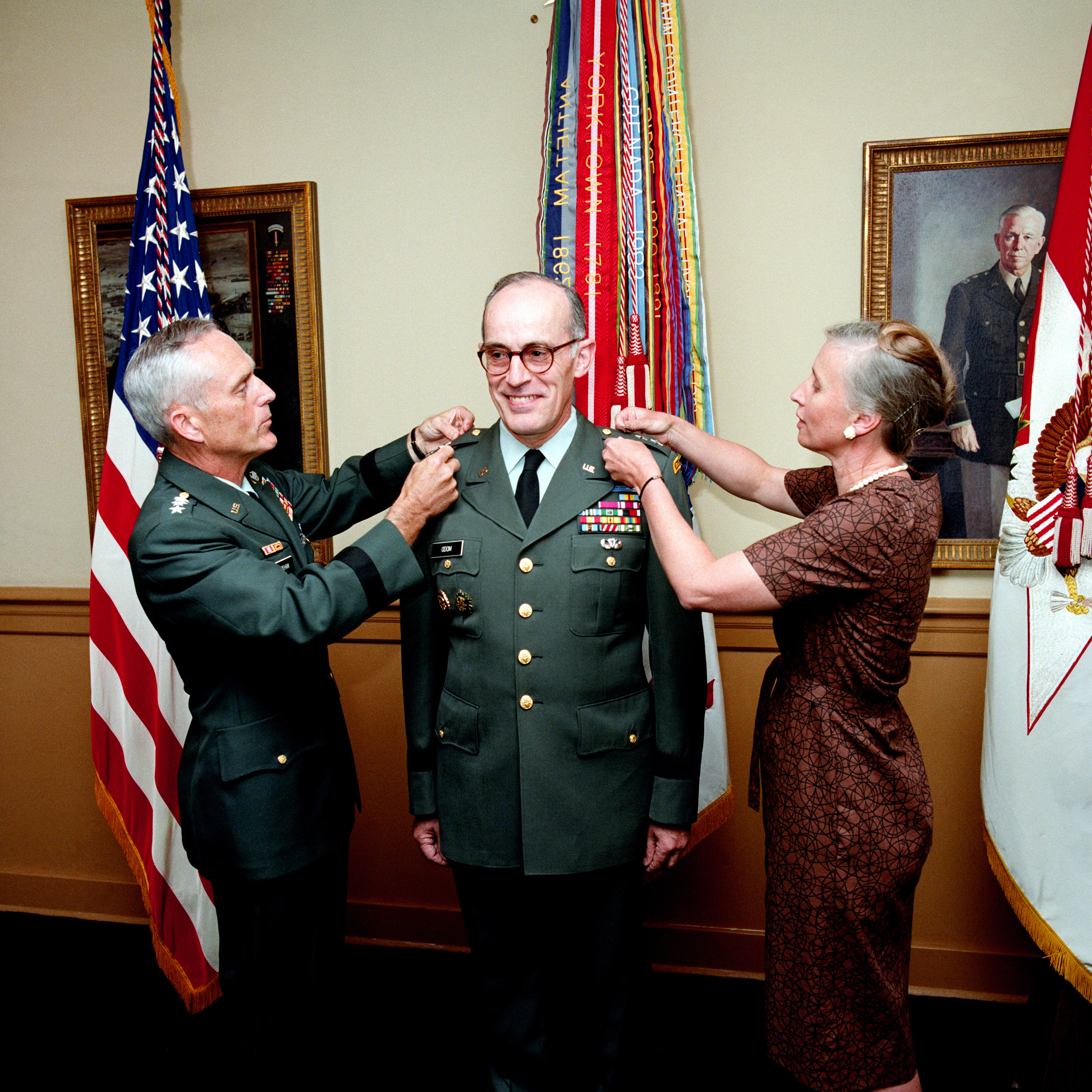
Army Chief of Staff Gen. John A. Wickham Jr. and Mrs. Ann Odom each pin a third star on the shoulders of Lt. Gen. William E. Odom during his promotion ceremony at the Pentagon, June 21, 1984.

Early in his military career, he observed Soviet military activities while serving as a military liaison in Potsdam, East Germany. Later, he taught courses in Russian history at West Point, New York, and while serving at the United States embassy in Moscow in the early 1970s, he visited all of the republics of the Union of Soviet Socialist Republics.

Upon returning to the United States, he resumed his career at West Point where he taught courses in Soviet politics. Odom regularly stressed the importance of education for military officers.

In 2003, he revealed how the question of the 1967 USS Liberty incident’s deliberateness “just wasn’t a disputed issue” within the NSA. Along with NSA Deputy Director for Operations Oliver Kirby, U.S. Air Force Major General John E. Morrison (Kirby’s successor), and Admiral Bobby Ray Inman, he said he was unaware of any agency official at any time who dissented from the “deliberate” conclusion.

In 1977, he was appointed as the military assistant to Zbigniew Brzezinski, the hawkish assistant for national security affairs to President Jimmy Carter. Among the primary issues he focused on were American-Soviet relations, including the SALT nuclear weapons talks, the Soviet invasion of Afghanistan, the Iran hostage crisis, presidential directives on the situation in the Persian Gulf, terrorism and hijackings, and the executive order on telecommunications policy.

From 2 November 1981 to 12 May 1985, Odom served as the Army's Assistant Chief of Staff for Intelligence. From 1985 to 1988, he served as the director of the National Security Agency, the United States' largest intelligence agency, under president Ronald Reagan.

Odom was a Senior Fellow at the Hudson Institute, where he specialized in military issues, intelligence, and international relations. He was also an adjunct professor at Yale University and Georgetown University, where he taught seminar courses in U.S. National Security Policy and Russian Politics. He earned a national reputation as an expert on the Soviet military.

Since 2005, he had argued that U.S. interests would be best served by an immediate withdrawal from Iraq, having called the 2003 U.S. invasion the worst strategic blunder in the history of U.S. foreign policy. He had also been critical of the NSA's warrantless wiretapping of international calls, having said "it wouldn't have happened on my watch". Odom was also openly critical of the neoconservative influence in the decision to go to war: "It's pretty hard to imagine us going into Iraq without the strong lobbying efforts from the AIPAC and the [neoconservatives], who think they know what's good for Israel more than Israel knows."

Odom was a member of the Military Intelligence Hall of Fame and the American Philosophical Society. He was also a member of the advisory council of the Victims of Communism Memorial Foundation.

== Decorations ==

Expert Infantryman Badge
Parachutist Badge
1st Row	Army Distinguished Service Medal		Defense Superior Service Medal	Legion of Merit
2nd Row	Meritorious Service Medal	Joint Service Commendation Medal	Army Commendation Medal with Oak Leaf Cluster	Army of Occupation Medal
3rd Row	National Defense Service Medal	Vietnam Service Medal with one service star	Vietnam Staff Service Medal, 1st Class	Vietnam Campaign Medal
Presidential Service Badge

== Bibliography ==
=== Books ===
- The Soviet Volunteers: Modernization and Bureaucracy in a Public Mass Organization (Princeton, N.J.: Princeton University Press, 360 pp., 1974)
- On Internal War: American and Soviet Approaches to Third World Clients and Insurgents (Duke University Press, 1992)
- Trial After Triumph: East Asia After the Cold War (Hudson Institute, 1992)
- America's Military Revolution: Strategy and Structure After the Cold War (American University Press, 1993)
- Commonwealth or Empire? Russia, Central Asia, and the Transcaucasus, with Robert Dujarric (Hudson Institute, 1995).
- The Collapse of the Soviet Military (Yale University Press, 1998, ISBN 0-300-08271-1). Won the Marshall Shulman Prize.
- Fixing Intelligence for a More Secure America (Yale University Press, 2003)
- America's Inadvertent Empire, co-authored with Robert Dujarric (Yale University Press, 2004), ISBN 0-300-10069-8

=== Congressional testimony ===
- June 21, 2002, "Testimony before the Senate Government Affairs Committee on creating a Department of Homeland Security", online version retrieved May 30, 2016.
- January 18, 2007, "Testimony before the Senate Foreign Relations Committee", online version retrieved May 30, 2016.
- April 2, 2008, "Testimony before the Senate Foreign Relations Committee on Iraq", online version retrieved May 30, 2016.

=== Television and radio appearances ===
- Major news shows such as PBS' The NewsHour with Jim Lehrer, ABC's Nightline, the BBC's The World Tonight
- CNN, NBC News
- Radio Free Mississippi with Jim Giles on May 6, 2008. Interview here.
- C-SPAN
- Hugh Hewitt on February 15, 2007. Transcript here.

Also has published newspaper op-ed pieces in The New York Times, The Wall Street Journal, The Washington Post and others.

== Quotes ==
- "The president has let [the Iraq war] proceed on automatic pilot, making no corrections in the face of accumulating evidence that his strategy is failing and cannot be rescued. He lets the United States fly further and further into trouble, squandering its influence, money and blood, facilitating the gains of our enemies.
- "An attempt to extort Congress into providing funds by keeping U.S. forces in peril [...] surely would constitute the 'high crime' of squandering the lives of soldiers and Marines for his own personal interest.
- "As many critics have pointed out, terrorism is not an enemy. It is a tactic. Because the United States itself has a long record of supporting terrorists and using terrorist tactics, the slogans of today's war on terrorism merely makes [sic] the United States look hypocritical to the rest of the world."
- "The invasion of Iraq may well turn out to be the greatest strategic disaster in American history.

Government offices
Preceded by Lincoln D. Faurer	Director of the National Security Agency; 1985–1988	Succeeded by William O. Studeman
