= NSWC =

NSWC may refer to:

- National Security and War Course, at the National Defence University, Pakistan
- Neighbourhood and Worker's Service Centre, a pro-democracy political group in Hong Kong

== United states military and intelligence community ==
- National SIGINT Watch Center, original name of the United States National Security Operations Center
- Naval Surface Warfare Center, part of United States Naval Sea Systems Command operations
- United States Naval Special Warfare Command, the Naval component of United States Special Operations Command

== See also ==
- National Security Whistleblowers Coalition (NSWBC), a non-profit alliance of whistleblowers
