= USS Manchester (CL-83) =

Light cruiser of the United States Navy

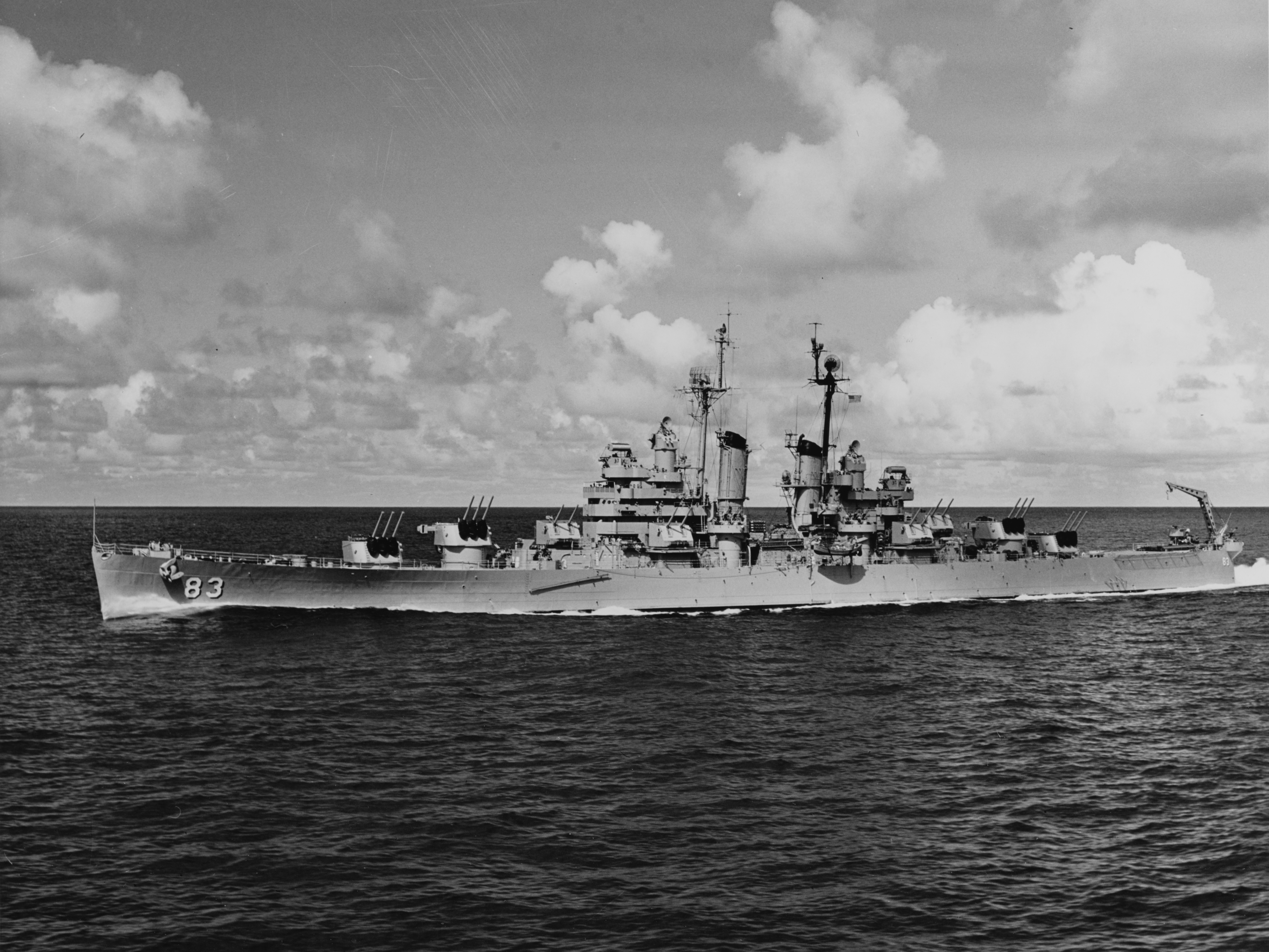
- USS Manchester off Korea, in 1950-1952

History

United States
- Name: Manchester
- Namesake: City of Manchester, New Hampshire
- Builder: Fore River Shipyard
- Laid down: 25 September 1944
- Launched: 5 March 1946
- Commissioned: 29 October 1946
- Decommissioned: 27 June 1956
- Stricken: 1 April 1960
- Fate: Sold for scrap on 31 October 1960

General characteristics
- Class & type: Cleveland-class light cruiser
- Displacement: Standard: 11,744 long tons (11,932 t); Full load: 14,131 long tons (14,358 t)
- Length: 610 ft 1 in (185.95 m)
- Beam: 66 ft 4 in (20.22 m)
- Draft: 24 ft 6 in (7.47 m)
- Installed power: 4 × Babcock & Wilcox boilers; 100,000 shp (75,000 kW)
- Propulsion: 4 × steam turbines; 4 × screw propellers
- Speed: 32.5 knots (60.2 km/h; 37.4 mph)
- Range: 11,000 nmi (20,000 km; 13,000 mi) at 15 kn (28 km/h; 17 mph)
- Complement: 1,285 officers and enlisted
- Armament: 12 × 6 in (152 mm) Mark 16 guns; 12 × 5 in (127 mm)/38 caliber guns; 28 × 40 mm (1.6 in) Bofors anti-aircraft guns; 10 × 20 mm (0.79 in) Oerlikon anti-aircraft guns
- Armor: Belt: 3.5–5 in (89–127 mm); Deck: 2 in (51 mm); Barbettes: 6 in (152 mm); Turrets: 6 in (152 mm); Conning Tower: 5 in (127 mm)
- Aircraft carried: 4 × floatplanes
- Aviation facilities: 2 × stern catapults

USS Manchester (hull number: CL-83) was a Cleveland-class light cruiser of the United States Navy, which were built during World War II. The class was designed as a development of the earlier Brooklyn-class cruisers, the size of which had been limited by the First London Naval Treaty. The start of the war led to the dissolution of the treaty system, but the dramatic need for new vessels precluded a new design, so the Clevelands used the same hull as their predecessors, but were significantly heavier. The Clevelands carried a main battery of twelve 6-inch (152 mm) guns in four three-gun turrets, along with a secondary armament of twelve 5 in (127 mm) dual-purpose guns. They had a top speed of 32.5 knots (60.2 km/h; 37.4 mph).

The ship was laid down 25 September 1944 by the Bethlehem Shipbuilding Corporation's Fore River Shipyard, Quincy, Massachusetts; launched 5 March 1946; sponsored by Mrs. Ernest J. Gladu; and commissioned 29 October 1946, Capt. Peter G. Hale in command.

== Design ==
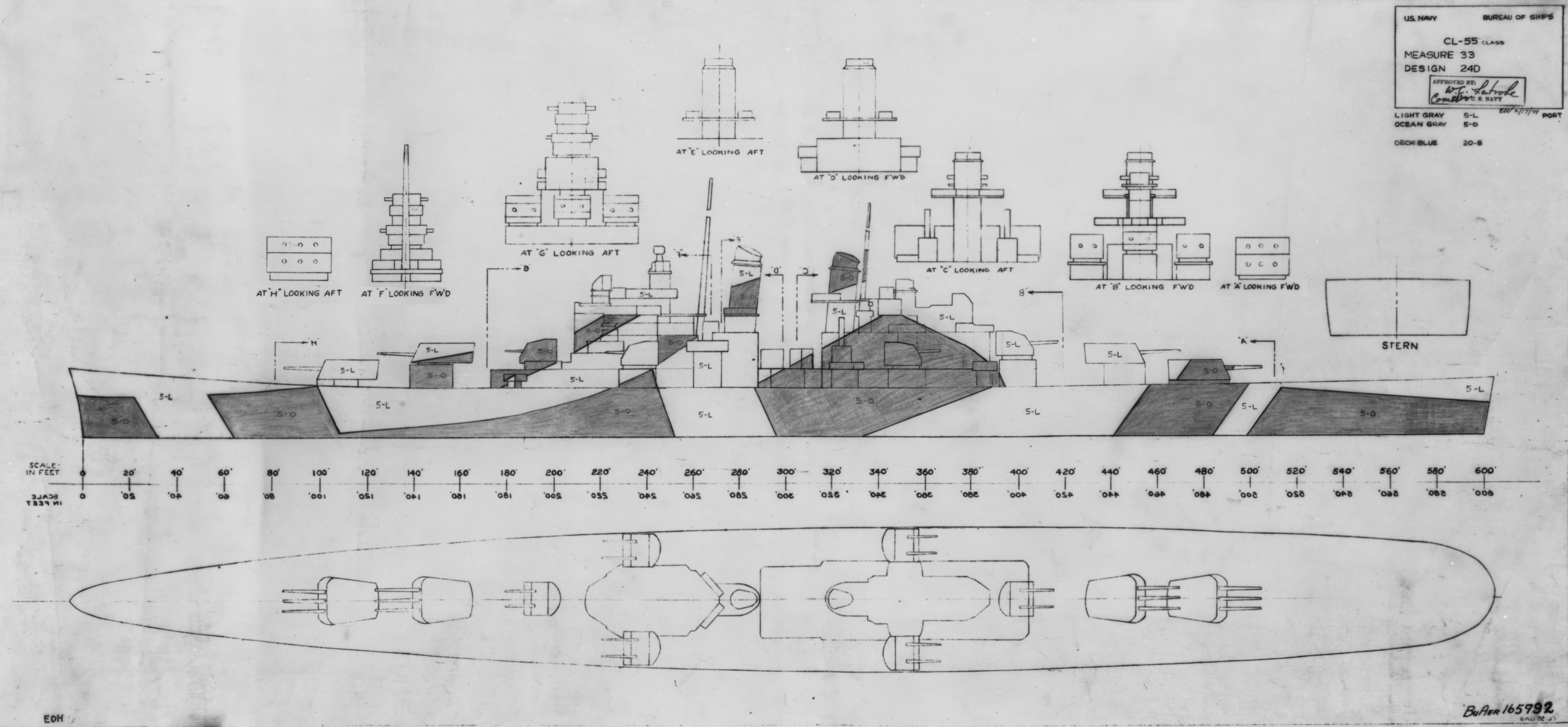
Depiction of the Cleveland class, showing the plan and profile

The Cleveland-class light cruisers traced their origin to design work done in the late 1930s; at the time, light cruiser displacement was limited to 8,000 long tons (8,100 t) by the Second London Naval Treaty. Following the start of World War II in September 1939, Britain announced it would suspend the treaty for the duration of the conflict, a decision the US Navy quickly followed. Though still neutral, the United States recognized that war was likely and the urgent need for additional ships ruled out an entirely new design, so the Clevelands were a close development of the earlier Brooklyn-class cruisers, the chief difference being the substitution of a two-gun 5 in (127 mm) dual-purpose gun mount for one of the main battery 6 in (152 mm) gun turrets.

Manchester was 610 feet 1 inch (186 m) long overall and had a beam of 66 ft 4 in (20.22 m) and a draft of 24 ft 6 in (7.47 m). Her standard displacement amounted to 11,744 long tons (11,932 t) and increased to 14,131 long tons (14,358 t) at full load. The ship was powered by four General Electric steam turbines, each driving one propeller shaft, using steam provided by four oil-fired Babcock & Wilcox boilers. Rated at 100,000 shaft horsepower (75,000 kW), the turbines were intended to give a top speed of 32.5 knots (60.2 km/h; 37.4 mph). Her crew numbered 1285 officers and enlisted men.

The ship was armed with a main battery of twelve 6 in /47-caliber Mark 16 guns (Note: /47 refers to the length of the gun in terms of calibers. A /47 gun is 47 times long as it is in bore diameter.) in four 3-gun turrets on the centerline. Two were placed forward in a superfiring pair; the other two turrets were placed aft of the superstructure in another superfiring pair. The secondary battery consisted of twelve 5 in (127 mm) /38-caliber dual-purpose guns mounted in twin turrets. Two of these were placed on the centerline, one directly behind the forward main turrets and the other just forward of the aft turrets. Two more were placed abreast of the conning tower and the other pair on either side of the aft superstructure. Anti-aircraft defense consisted of twenty-eight Bofors 40 mm (1.6 in) guns in four quadruple and six double mounts and ten Oerlikon 20 mm (0.79 in) guns in single mounts.

The ship's belt armor ranged in thickness from 3.5 to 5 in (89 to 127 mm), with the thicker section amidships where it protected the ammunition magazines and propulsion machinery spaces. Her deck armor was 2 in (51 mm) thick. The main battery turrets were protected with 6.5 in (170 mm) faces and 3 in (76 mm) sides and tops, and they were supported by barbettes 6 inches thick. Manchester's conning tower had 5-inch sides.

== Service history ==
=== Mediterranean, 1947–1949 ===
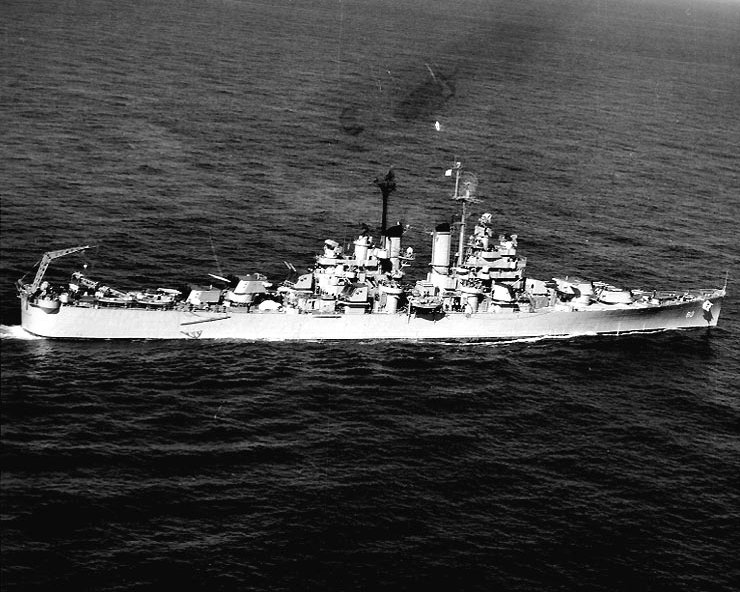
Manchester in the Mediterranean Sea, 9 March 1948.

Manchester completed her shakedown cruise in the Caribbean and returned to Boston, her home port, 26 March 1947. There she was equipped with an experimental plastic cover for her bridge to be tested on her first transatlantic crossing. On 18 April, she steamed for the Mediterranean to lend visible support to the Truman Doctrine of 12 March. Returning to the East Coast for two weeks in June, she conducted a Naval Reserve training cruise out of Newport, R.I. She resumed her Mediterranean cruise 25 June, returning to Boston 30 November. Manchester completed two more deployments with the 6th Fleet (9 February to 26 June 1948, 3 January to 4 March 1949) before departing Philadelphia 18 March for assignment with the Pacific Fleet.

=== Far East, 1949 ===
She arrived at Long Beach 3 April and departed two weeks later for the politically volatile Far East, entering the harbor at Tsingtao, China, 15 May. The cruiser operated in the Yellow, East China, and South China Seas until returning to Long Beach 28 November.

During this time, the Nationalist Chinese forces, having suffered extreme setbacks, had begun their withdrawal to the island of Taiwan, 16 July, and the People's Republic of China had been proclaimed at Peiping, 1 October 1949. The success of the Red Chinese bolstered other Asian Communist aspirations. On 25 June 1950, North Korean leaders ordered their troops to cross the 38th parallel into South Korea. The United Nations quickly declared North Korea the aggressor and called on members of that body to repel the invasion, 26 to 27 June.

=== Korean War, 1950–1953 ===
==== 1950 ====
At that time, Manchester, docked at San Francisco, was undergoing overhaul. Work was sped up and by 1 August the cruiser was on her way to the Western Pacific. She arrived at Sasebo, Japan, in early September and joined TF 77. As part of a carrier group, she commenced operations in the Yellow Sea, supporting United Nations Forces air efforts against the elongated Communist communications lines by coastal patrol, blockade, and bombardment. On 15 September, Manchester provided fire support for the landings at Inchon. After the establishment of major control of the Inchon–Seoul transport complex, she moved north to bombard North Korean troop concentrations on Tungsan Got, while aircraft from her strike force hit the railhead at Ongjin, 27 September. This action effectively slowed reinforcement of Communist forces in the south by disrupting their supply lines and keeping their troops occupied in defensive action.

Manchester then steamed with her task group around the peninsula to support the invasion at Wonsan. Arriving 10 October, she commenced shore bombardment and patrol duties in support of the minesweeping operations in the area while planes from TF 77 conducted raids against North Korean vessels, road and rail centers, warehouses, and supply depots as far north as Songjin. The U.N. Forces soon reached the Yalu River and, as the heavy fighting appeared to be over, Manchester was reassigned, 29 October, to TF 72, then patrolling the Taiwan Straits. This patrol duty was ended shortly thereafter by the full scale intervention of Communist Chinese troops in Korea. On 3 December, the cruiser rejoined TF 77 and steamed to Hungnam to support the complete evacuation of that port and the demolition of its facilities. Completing this operation, the task force continued to defend U.N. units, effecting their safe withdrawal from untenable positions.

==== 1951 ====
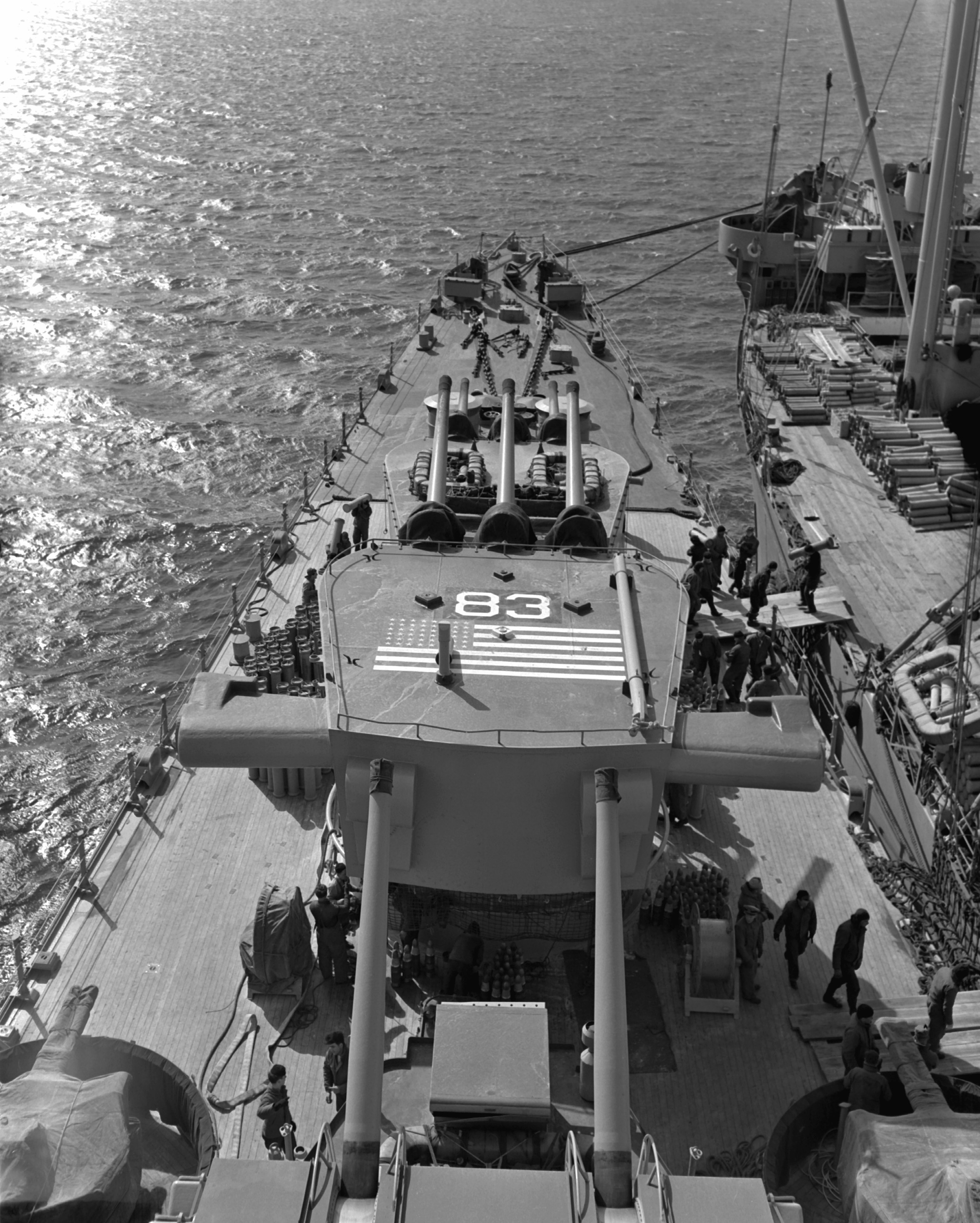
Manchester alongside USS Mount Katmai at Wonsan on 3 May 1951.

On 8 January 1951, Manchester evacuated injured crewmembers from the Thai corvette HTMS Prasae, which had grounded the previous day behind enemy lines near Kisamon Tan on the east coast. Naval gunfire kept enemy soldiers from swarming onto the ship until, the ship having been declared unsalvageable, the remainder of the crew was taken off by the cruiser's helicopter. Guns from accompanying destroyers were then turned on Prasae.

For the next month and a half, Manchester patrolled off the east coast of Korea. Firing at both shore and inland targets, she blasted communication and transportation centers, destroying and disrupting the enemy's equipment and troop concentrations. On 22 February, she steamed to Wonsan to add her guns to the siege and blockade of that port which had commenced five days earlier. She continued to conduct shore bombardment activities along the northeast coast, primarily at Wonsan and Songjin, for the remainder of her first Korean combat tour.

On 1 June, Manchester departed Korean waters for Yokosuka en route back to Long Beach, arriving in California 15 June. Spending less than five months at home, the cruiser was underway for the Far East again 5 November. She arrived back in the combat zone 8 December and took up duties as flagship of TF 95, the U.N. blockading and escort force.

==== 1952 ====
By this time, the conflict had altered in character, from quick forceful action to perseverance in the systematic destruction of the enemy's personnel and equipment. To this purpose, TF 95 maintained a blockade along the entire Korean coast and bombarded the Communist's main supply routes, which, because of the mountainous terrain, lay on the narrow coastal plains. Manchester patrolled along the Korean Peninsula shelling military targets in areas such as Chinnamp'o, Chongjin, Tong'Cho-Ri as well as regularly returning to Hungnam, Songjin, and Wonsan to add to the destruction of those tightly held enemy positions. While her guns blasted, Manchester's helicopters continued her reputation as a good friend of downed pilots, performing rescues at sea and on land behind enemy lines. Her medical officers also worked overtime aiding sick and wounded members of the U.N. Forces.

On 14 May 1952, Manchester completed her second tour in Korea and departed the bombline on the east coast of Korea. She returned to Long Beach 29 May, departing two weeks later for voyage repairs and overhaul at San Francisco.

==== 1953 ====
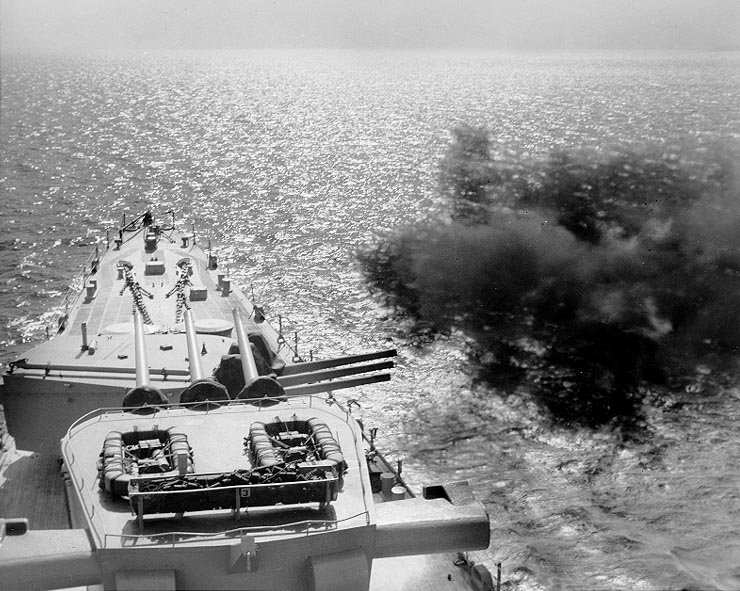
Manchester firing with her forward turret off the North Korean east coast, March 1953.

The new year, 1953, brought no change in the negative results of the cease-fire talks begun at Kaesong 10 July 1951 and later moved to Panmunjom. The conflict continued and Manchester departed on 25 January for her third deployment in Korean waters. On 4 March, she rejoined TF 77 on the bombline off the peninsula's east coast. On 8 March, she returned to Wonsan and again commenced shelling Wonsan. She came back to this besieged city periodically during this tour, spending the remainder of the time on patrol along the bombline, providing fire support for the U.N. Forces at the eastern end of the frontline.

On 23 July, Manchester departed Korea for Yokosuka. On 27 July, the Korean Armistice Agreement was signed at Panmunjom and hostilities ended. On 28 July, Manchester got underway for her homeport, having successfully completed three combat tours with no major battle damage.

=== Pacific, 1954–1956 ===
During 1954 and 1955, the cruiser was twice deployed for six month periods with the 7th Fleet in the western Pacific. On her last return voyage she participated in Operation "Glory", the return to Hawaii of fifty unidentified American dead from the Korean War. Departing Yokosuka 20 January 1956, she stopped at Pearl Harbor for ceremonies and continued on to Long Beach, arriving 5 February. At the end of the month, she sailed for San Francisco, where she entered the Reserve Fleet 27 February, and decommissioned 27 June 1956. Struck from the Navy list 1 April 1960, she was sold 31 October 1960 to the Nicolai Joffe Corp.

== Awards ==
- World War II Victory Medal
- Navy Occupation Medal with "EUROPE" and "ASIA" clasps
- China Service Medal
- National Defense Service Medal
- Korean Service Medal with nine battle stars
- Korean Presidential Unit Citation
- United Nations Korea Medal
- Korean War Service Medal

For part of her Korean deployment (12 July 1951 – 29 May 1952), she was commanded by Laurence Hugh Frost, who would later be the Director of the National Security Agency under Presidents Eisenhower and Kennedy.
