= Bobby Ray Inman =

United States Navy admiral (1931–2026)

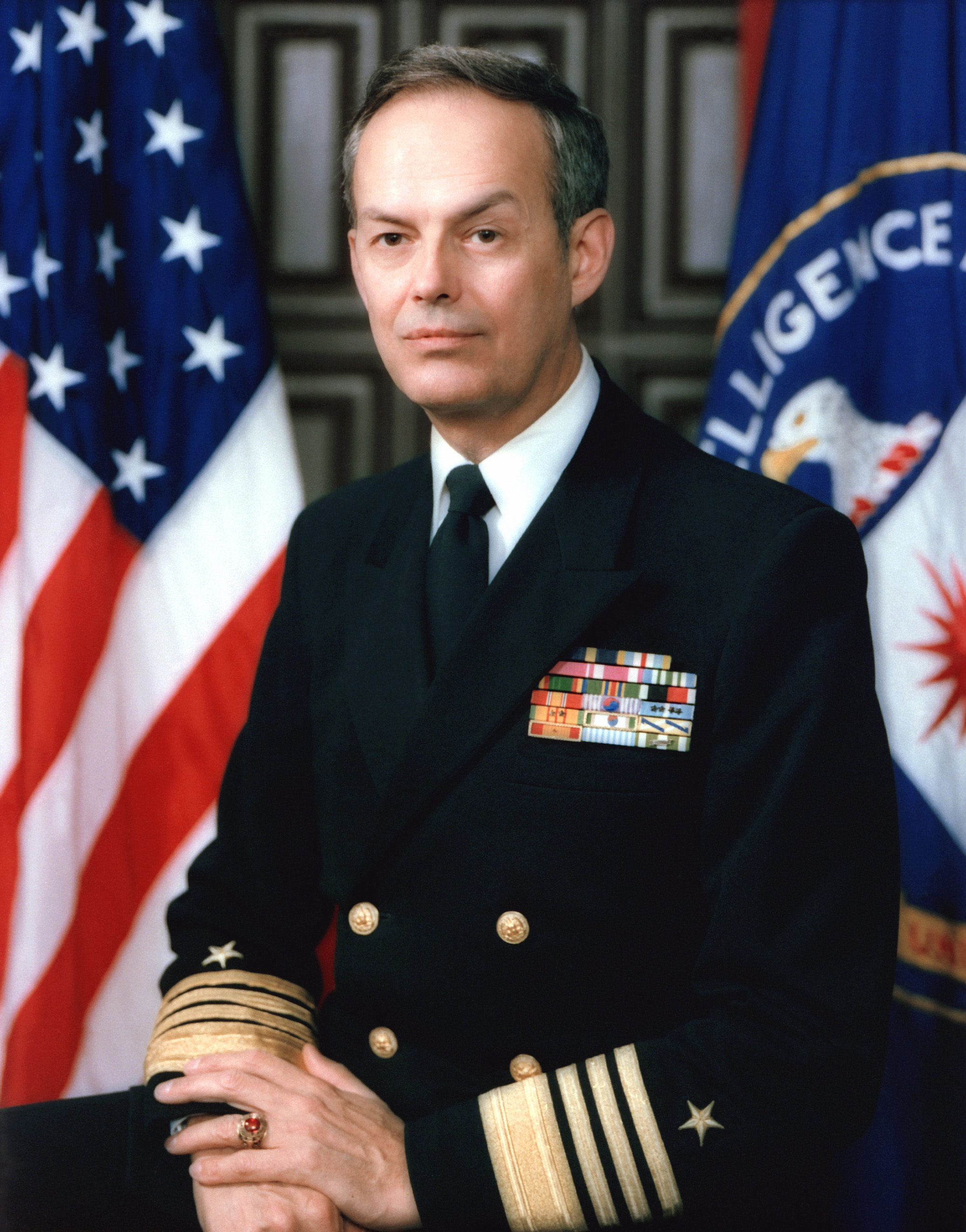
- Inman in 1983

Chair of the President's Intelligence Advisory Board
- Acting; April 5, 1991 – January 20, 1993
- President: George H. W. Bush
- Preceded by: John Tower
- Succeeded by: William Crowe

14th Deputy Director of Central Intelligence
- In office February 12, 1981 – June 10, 1982
- President: Ronald Reagan
- Preceded by: Frank Carlucci
- Succeeded by: John McMahon

Director of the National Security Agency
- In office July 1977 – February 12, 1981
- President: Jimmy Carter; Ronald Reagan
- Deputy: Benson Buffham; Robert Drake; Ann Caracristi
- Preceded by: Lew Allen
- Succeeded by: Lincoln Faurer

Personal details
- Born: April 4, 1931 Rhonesboro, Texas, U.S.
- Died: November 19, 2026 (aged 95) Austin, Texas, U.S.
- Party: Republican
- Spouse: Nancy Carolyn Russo (m. 1958)
- Children: 2
- Education: Tyler Junior College; University of Texas, Austin (BA)

Military service
- Allegiance: United States
- Branch/service: United States Navy
- Years of service: 1951–1982
- Rank: Admiral
- Battles/wars: Korean War; Vietnam War
- Awards: Navy Distinguished Service Medal; Defense Superior Service Medal; Legion of Merit

Bobby Ray Inman (April 4, 1931 – November 19, 2026) was a United States Navy admiral who held several influential positions in the United States Intelligence Community. Inman is mainly known for having held executive leadership positions at virtually all major U.S. intelligence agencies and for his brief but controversial 1993 nomination to become U.S. Secretary of Defense, which was ultimately unsuccessful. His thirty-one-year military career, which began with his commissioning in the Naval Reserve in 1952, culminated in him achieving the permanent rank of four-star Admiral, becoming the first naval intelligence specialist to ever attain that rank.

== Early years ==
Inman was born on April 4, 1931, and raised in the community of Rhonesboro, Texas, in the eastern portion of the state. His father was the owner and operator of a gas station. Inman attended and graduated from Mineola High School. Inman recalled in 1986 that he was 5 feet 4 inches (163 cm) tall and weighed 96 pounds (44 kg) upon graduation, and he tutored athletes he admired during high school to keep from being bullied.

He graduated from Mineola High School in Mineola, Texas, at the age of 15, in 1946. He attended Tyler Junior College, where he was inducted into the local chapter of the Phi Theta Kappa honor society at age 16, and graduated in 1948. He graduated from the University of Texas at Austin in 1950 at the age of 19. According to Stephen Budiansky, after joining the Naval Reserve during the Korean War, Inman then "rocketed up through the ranks of naval intelligence".

== Naval career ==
Inman served as Director of Naval Intelligence from September 1974 to July 1976, then moved to the Defense Intelligence Agency where he served as vice director until 1977. He next became the director of the National Security Agency. Inman held this post until 1981. His last major position was as the deputy director of Central Intelligence, a post he held from February 12, 1981, to June 10, 1982.

He "flatly rejected" Israel's mistaken identity claim regarding the 1967 USS Liberty incident. He stated that "It is just exceedingly difficult to believe that [the USS Liberty] was not correctly identified.” He said his conclusions were based on his talks with senior NSA officials who had direct knowledge at the time. Along with NSA Deputy Director for Operations Oliver Kirby, U.S. Air Force Major General John E. Morrison (Kirby's successor), and Lieutenant General William E. Odom, he said he was unaware of any agency official at any time who dissented from the "deliberate" conclusion.

While simultaneously acting as the NSA director and the CIA deputy director in early 1981, he modernized the collection process by setting up a joint facility in College Park, Maryland. According to Budiansky, Inman did so by "sending memos back and forth to himself approving his solutions."

In 1976, Martin Hellman and Whitfield Diffie published their paper, "New directions in cryptography", introducing a radically new method of distributing cryptographic keys, which went far toward solving one of the fundamental problems of cryptography, key distribution. It has become known as Diffie–Hellman key exchange. However, when Hellman and two of his graduate students attempted to present their work on this on October 10, 1977, at the International Symposium on Information Theory, the National Security Agency warned them that doing so would be legally equivalent to exporting nuclear weapons to a hostile foreign power. Inman led the NSA at the time, and he feared that encryption – which had so far only been used for military purposes – would be used by hostile foreign powers, reducing the ability of the NSA to collect signals intelligence. However, Hellman – who anticipated that the increasing use of electronic communications in private sector transactions would require encryption – proceeded to give the talk. While this defied the NSA's threat of prosecution, Inman eventually realised Hellman's point and there was no prosecution. Hellman and Inman even became friends. Public key cryptography now forms an essential component of internet security.

In 1980, Inman allowed an openly gay linguist at the NSA to maintain a security clearance. National policy on security clearances would not officially change until 1995.

Inman chaired a commission on improving security at U.S. foreign installations after the Marine barracks bombing and the April 1983 US Embassy bombing in Beirut, Lebanon. The commission's report has been influential in setting security design standards for U.S. Embassies.

After retirement from the Navy, he was chairman and chief executive officer of the Microelectronics and Computer Technology Corporation (MCC) in Austin, Texas for four years and chairman, president and chief executive officer of Westmark Systems, Inc., a privately owned electronics industry holding company for three years. Admiral Inman also served as chairman of the Federal Reserve Bank of Dallas from 1987 through 1990.

His primary activity from 1990 on was investing in start-up technology companies and as per he was a managing director of Limestone Ventures. He was a member of the board of directors of several privately held companies. He served as a trustee of the American Assembly and the California Institute of Technology. He was an elected Fellow of the National Academy of Public Administration.

President Clinton nominated him as Secretary of Defense, but he withdrew his nomination (see below).

In addition to his public service, Admiral Inman also held significant positions in the private sector. He served as a member of the board of directors for Science Applications International Corporation (SAIC), a prominent American technology and defense contractor. His tenure on the SAIC board was noted in public reports, particularly given his extensive background in U.S. intelligence, having previously served as director of the National Security Agency and deputy director of Central Intelligence. Inman's role as a director at SAIC concluded in October 2003.

From 2001 on, Inman held the LBJ Centennial Chair in National Policy at The University of Texas at Austin Lyndon B. Johnson School of Public Affairs, and in 2005 and again in 2009 was the school's interim dean. Inman graduated from Texas with a bachelor's in history in 1950.

Inman also served on the boards of directors of the Council on Foreign Relations, Dell Computer, SBC Corporation (now AT&T) and Massey Energy.

In 2011, he became head of the board of directors of Xe Services, formerly Erik Prince's Blackwater and now known as Academi. As of 2013, he sat on the board of directors of Academi.

== Nomination for Secretary of Defense ==
Inman was announced as President Bill Clinton's choice to succeed Les Aspin as Secretary of Defense on December 16, 1993, initially receiving broad bipartisan support. He accepted the post at first, but withdrew his nomination during a press conference on January 18, 1994.

During the press conference, Inman made angry remarks about comments by The New York Times columnist William Safire. Safire wrote paragraphs on Inman's "anti-Israel bias shown", and ended in a four-point list of other negative qualifications. In reply, Inman suggested that Safire had recruited Senator Bob Dole of Kansas to engage in a "vitriolic attack" on Inman, and also claimed that Dole and Senator Trent Lott were planning to "turn up the heat" on his nomination.

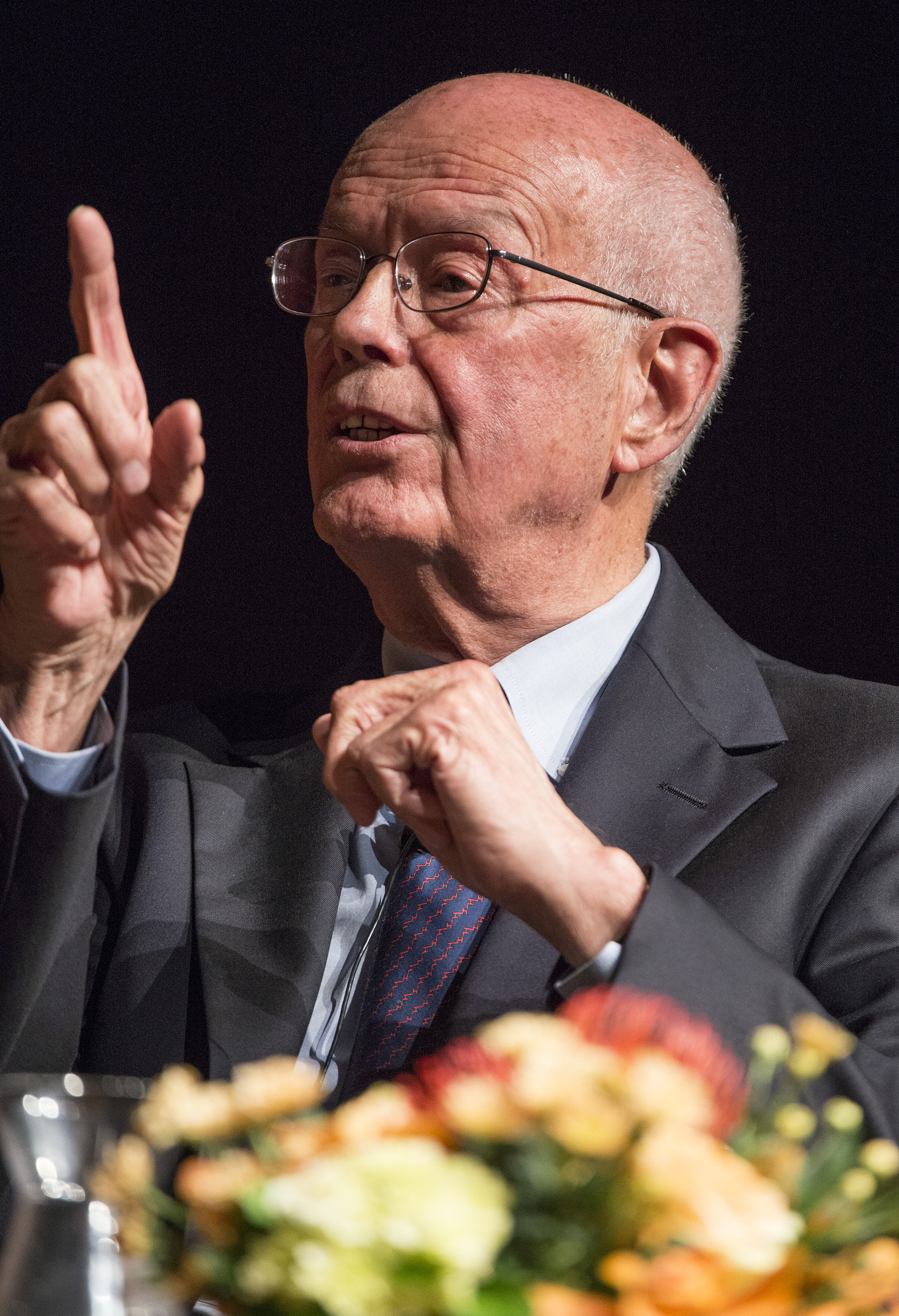
Inman at the LBJ Presidential Library in 2016

Dole's reaction was to state that "I have no idea what's gotten into Bobby Inman... Admiral Inman's letter does not make any sense to me." Lott appeared even more surprised, saying that "I am floored by [Inman's] bizarre press conference", while an unnamed White House aide added: "Most of us were glued to the tube, our mouths open in shock."

== International Signal and Control (ISC) Scandal ==
In 1994, after Inman asked to be withdrawn from consideration as Defense Secretary, his critics speculated that the decision was motivated by a desire to conceal his links to International Signal and Control (ISC). Inman was a member of the board of directors of the company, which allegedly either was negligent or approved illegal exports.

Originally called ESI (Electronic Systems International), the company manufactured sub-assemblies for the AGM-45 Shrike and RIM-7 Sea Sparrow missiles in 1974, and just after the Vietnam War which was part of a standard arms contract for the U.S. defense administration (DCAS). The company also had a commercial repair facility of two meter portable amateur ("ham") radios from a company in New Jersey called Clegg, and manufactured communications helmet radios for firemen, and electronic outdoor bug zappers.

ISC was involved in two major indiscretions, for which CEO James Guerin received a 15-year prison sentence:

- It defrauded and caused the collapse of the British company Ferranti, which acquired it in 1987.
- It exported classified military technology to South Africa, which was then forwarded to third countries, notably Iraq.

From 1984 to 1988, ISC sent South Africa more than $30 million in military-related equipment, including telemetry tracking antennae to collect data from missiles in flight, gyroscopes for guidance systems, and photo-imaging film readers, all of which would form the "backbone" of a medium-range missile system. Some of this technology was reportedly transferred to Iraq. Another link to Iraq was the supply of the specifications for the Mk 20 Rockeye II cluster bomb through Chilean defense company Cardoen Industries, which was able to build an almost identical weapon that was subsequently used against coalition forces in the Persian Gulf War of January–February 1991.

== Statements ==
In 2006, Inman criticized the Bush administration's use of warrantless domestic wiretaps, making him one of the highest-ranking former intelligence officials to criticize the program in public.

In the 2024 United States presidential election, Inman endorsed Kamala Harris.

== Personal life and death ==
Inman married Nancy Carolyn Russo in 1958, and had two sons. Inman died in Austin, Texas, on November 19, 2026, at the age of 95.

== Awards and decorations ==

1st row	Navy Distinguished Service Medal		Defense Superior Service Medal
2nd row	Legion of Merit	Meritorious Service Medal	Joint Service Commendation Medal
3rd row	Navy Unit Commendation	Navy Meritorious Unit Commendation	Navy Occupation Service Medal
4th row	National Defense Service Medal with one bronze service star	Korean Service Medal with four bronze stars	Vietnam Service Medal
5th row	Republic of Korea Order of National Security Merit, Cheon-Su Medal	South Vietnam Navy Distinguished Service Order (2nd Class)	Vietnam Gallantry Cross with gold star
6th row	Republic of Korea Presidential Unit Citation	United Nations Korea Medal	Vietnam Campaign Medal

In 1982, Inman received the American Academy of Achievement's Golden Plate Award presented by Awards Council member General David C. Jones at a ceremony in New Orleans.

== See also ==
- Unsuccessful nominations to the Cabinet of the United States

Government offices
Preceded by Lew Allen	Director of the National Security Agency; 1977–1981	Succeeded by Lincoln Faurer
Preceded by Frank Carlucci	Deputy Director of Central Intelligence; 1981–1982	Succeeded by John McMahon
Preceded by John Tower	Chair of the President's Intelligence Advisory Board; Acting; 1991–1993	Succeeded by William Crowe
