= Marshall Carter =

United States Army general (1909–1993)

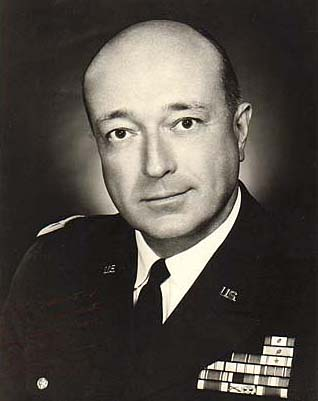
- Born: September 16, 1909; Fort Monroe, Virginia, US
- Died: February 18, 1993 (aged 83); Colorado Springs, Colorado, US
- Burial place: Arlington National Cemetery
- Relatives: Brigadier General Clifton C. Carter (father)
- Military career
- Allegiance: United States
- Branch: United States Army
- Service years: 1931–1969
- Rank: Lieutenant General
- Commands: National Security Agency
- Conflicts: World War II
- Awards: Army Distinguished Service Medal (3); Legion of Merit (2); Bronze Star Medal

Marshall Sylvester Carter (September 16, 1909 – February 18, 1993) was a lieutenant general in the United States Army. From 1965 to 1969, he served as Director of the National Security Agency.

== Life and career ==
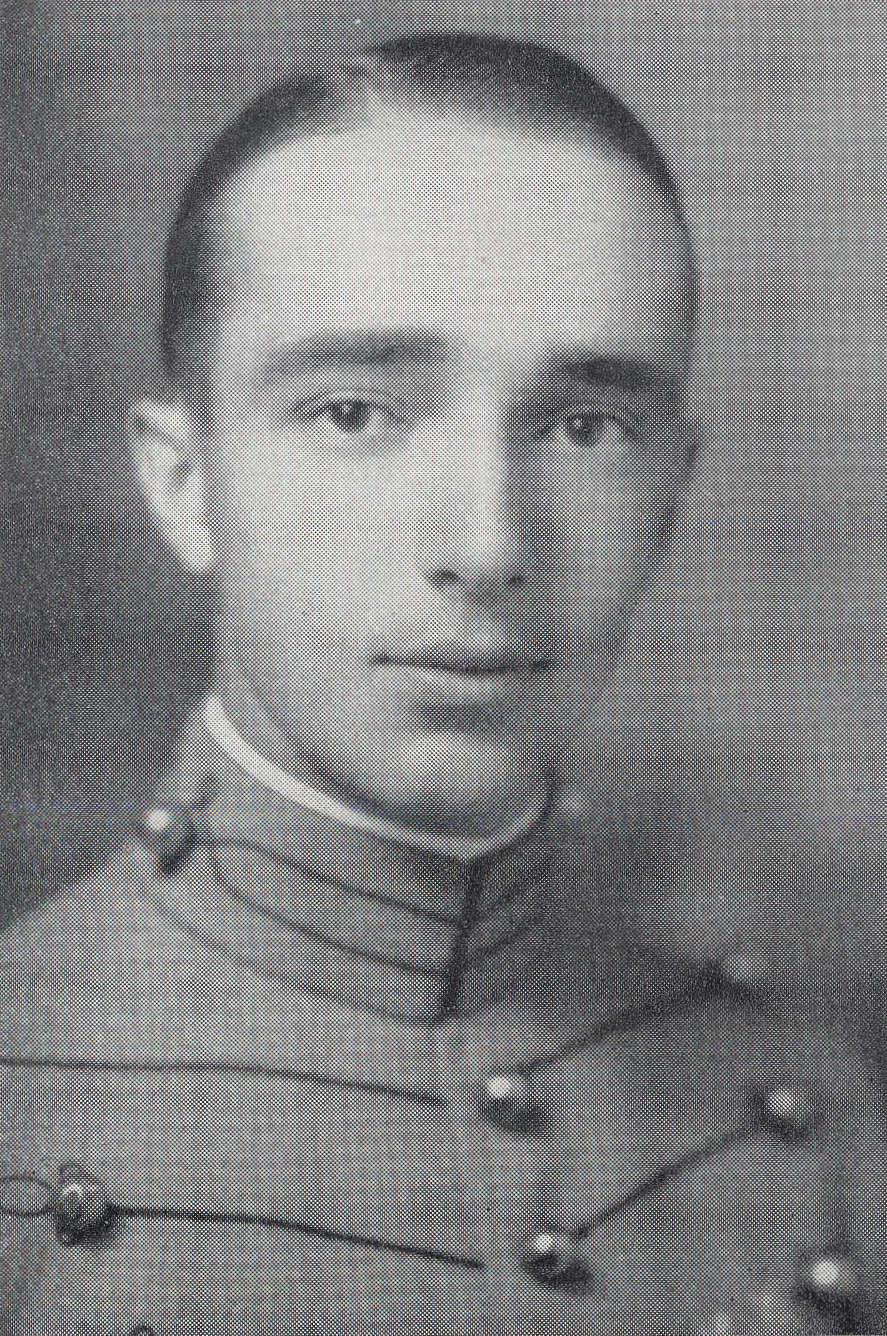
Carter as a United States Military Academy cadet c. 1931

Carter was born on September 16, 1909, at Fort Monroe, Virginia, the son of future brigadier general Clifton C. Carter. He graduated from the United States Military Academy in 1931 and took an M.S. degree from the Massachusetts Institute of Technology in 1936.

Carter served as an aide to General George C. Marshall during Marshall's time as Chief of Staff of the United States Army, Secretary of State, and Secretary of Defense.

Carter, then a lieutenant general, served as Deputy Director of Central Intelligence from April 3, 1962, to April 28, 1965. From 1965 to 1969, he served as Director of the National Security Agency. While serving as Director of the NSA, Carter testified to a House Appropriations Committee about the 1967 USS Liberty incident. He stated that “It couldn’t be anything else but deliberate. There’s just no way you could have a series of circumstances that would justify it being an accident.” Upon retirement from the military, he served as President of the George C. Marshall Research Foundation until retiring from that position in 1985.

Carter was inducted into the Military Intelligence Hall of Fame. He was portrayed by Ed Lauter in the film Thirteen Days (2000), based on events occurring during the Cuban Missile Crisis. Carter is buried in Arlington National Cemetery with his wife, Preot Nichols Carter (1912–1997).

Carter died of liver cancer on February 18, 1993, in his home in Colorado Springs

== Decorations ==

1st Row	Army Distinguished Service Medal with two Oak Leaf Clusters			
2nd Row	Legion of Merit with Oak Leaf Cluster	Bronze Star Medal	American Defense Service Medal with Foreign Service Clasp	American Campaign Medal
3rd Row	Asiatic-Pacific Campaign Medal	European-African-Middle Eastern Campaign Medal	World War II Victory Medal	Army of Occupation Medal
4th Row	National Defense Service Medal with Oak Leaf Cluster	Chinese Special Breast Order of Yun Hui	Commander of the Order of Orange-Nassau (Netherlands)	Chinese Special Breast Order of Yun Hui (Second Award)

Government offices
Preceded by Charles Pearre Cabell	Deputy Director of Central Intelligence; 1962–1965	Succeeded by Richard M. Helms
Preceded by Gordon A. Blake	Director of the National Security Agency; 1965–1969	Succeeded by Noel A. M. Gayler
