= National Security Operations Center =

Operations center at the NSA

Coordinates: 39°6′32″N 76°46′17″W

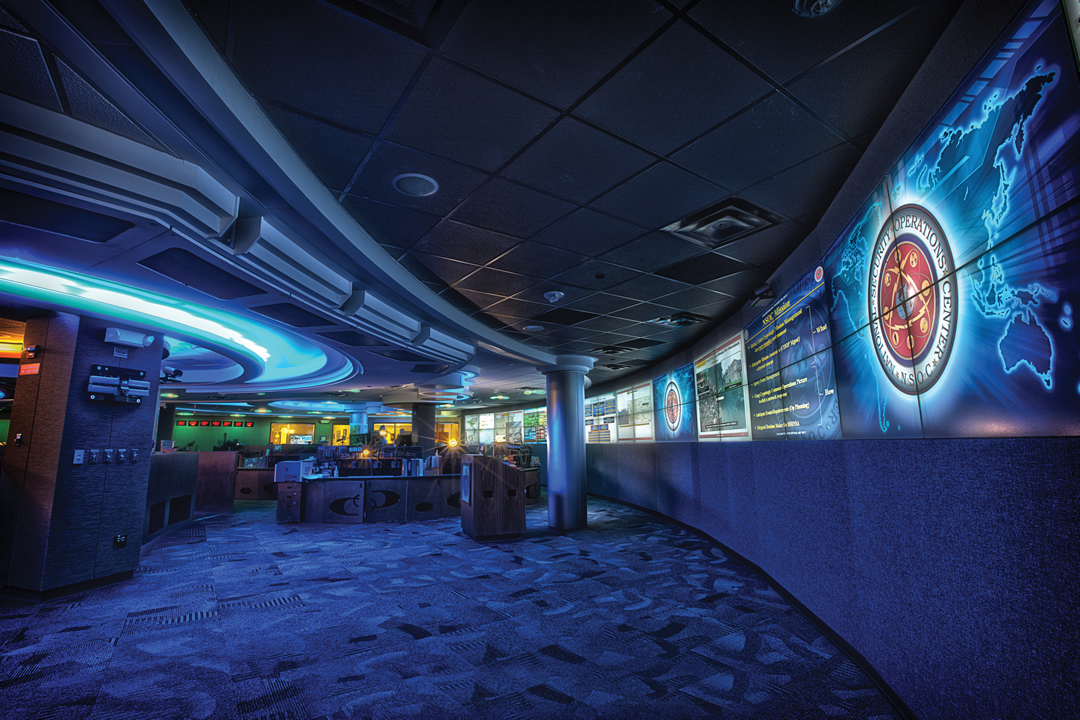
National Security Operations Center (NSOC) in 2012

The National Security Operations Center (NSOC) or Directorate K is the part of the United States National Security Agency responsible for current operations and time-sensitive signals intelligence (SIGINT) reporting for the United States SIGINT System (USSS). It is one of two centers watching; the other being Directorate V or the NTOC which assesses threats.

== Functions ==
NSOC is an operations center on a 24 hours a day, 7 days a week basis, providing total situational awareness across the NSA/CSS enterprise for both foreign Signals Intelligence and Information Assurance, maintaining cognizance of national security information needs, and monitoring unfolding world events.

== History ==
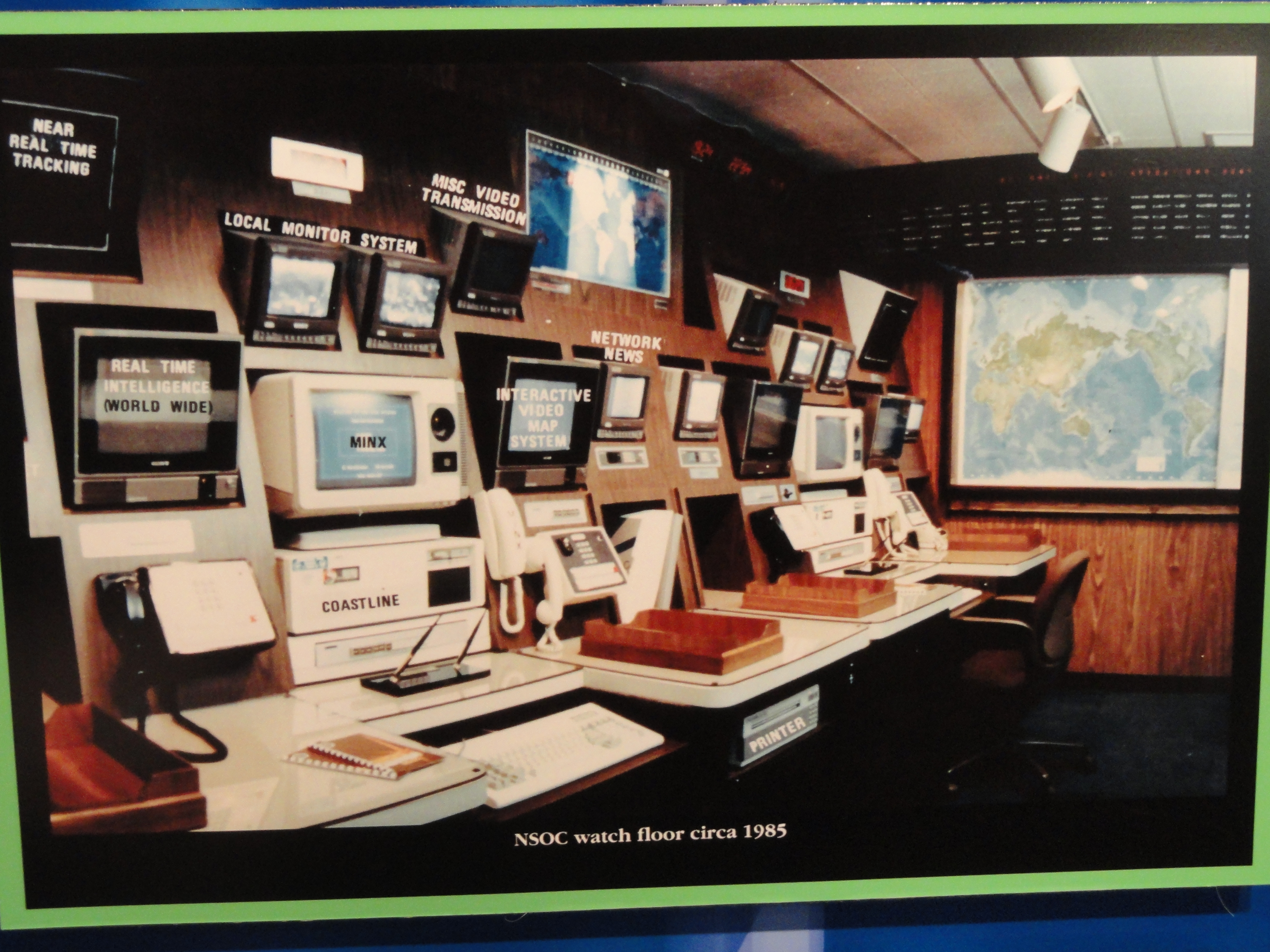
National SIGINT Operations Center (NSOC) circa 1985

In 1969, a U.S. Navy EC-121 patrol plane was shot down over the Sea of Japan. In the ensuing hours, NSA leaders raced from office to office to gather the information necessary to assemble a coordinated response for the agency and national leadership. This incident demonstrated the need for a dedicated watch center to respond to breaking world events.

The NSA Assistant Director for Production (ADP) at that time, John E. Morrison, proposed to the Director of NSA (DIRNSA) that a single National SIGINT watch center be established. The center was established in 1968 as the National SIGINT Watch Center (NSWC) and was renamed into National SIGINT Operations Center (NSOC) in 1973. This "nerve center of the NSA" got its current name in 1996.

After the September 11, 2001 attacks, the NSOC's mission was broadened from a watch center to the operations center it is today.

== See also ==
- National Military Command Center (NMCC)
- National Reconnaissance Operations Center (NROC)
- White House Situation Room
