= Rhonesboro, Texas =

Rhonesboro
- Unincorporated community
- Location within the state of Texas Rhonesboro (the United States)
- Coordinates: 32°45′16″N 95°08′27″W
- Country: United States
- State: Texas
- County: Upshur
- Elevation: 568 ft (173 m)
- Time zone: UTC-6 (Central (CST))
  - Summer (DST): UTC-5 (CDT)
- Area code: 903
- GNIS feature ID: 1378957

Rhonesboro is an unincorporated community in Upshur County, Texas, United States.

== Notable person ==
- Bobby Ray Inman, United States admiral and former head of NSA, was born in Rhonesboro.
