= Laurence Hugh Frost =

United States admiral (1902–1977)

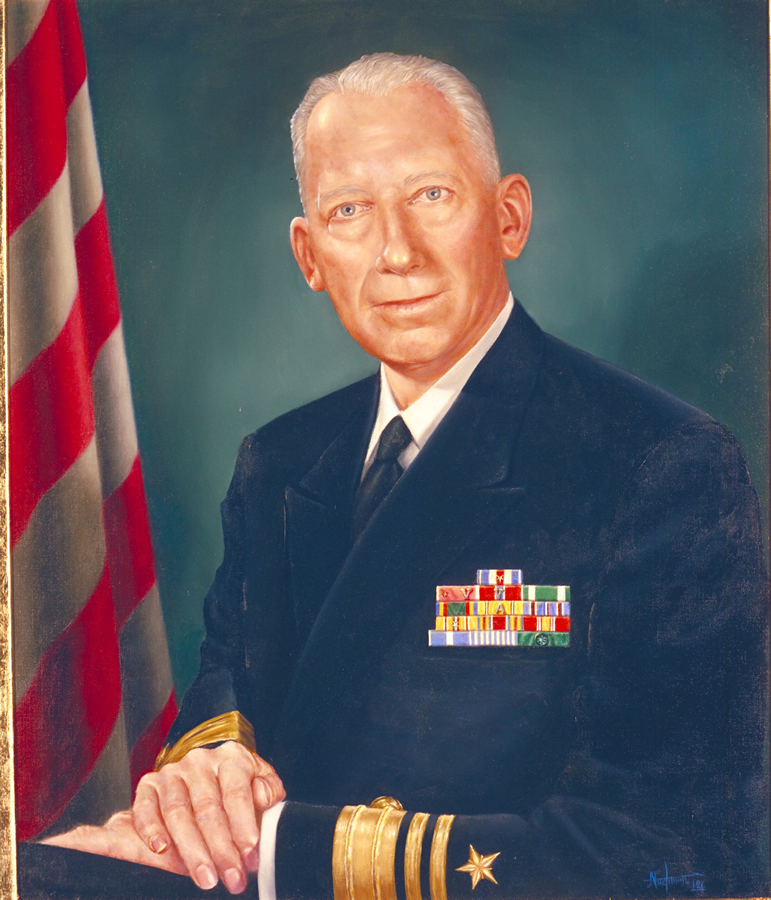
- Born: July 22, 1902; Fayetteville, Arkansas, U.S.
- Died: May 23, 1977 (aged 74); Portsmouth, Virginia, U.S.
- Military career
- Allegiance: United States
- Branch: United States Navy
- Service years: 1926–1964
- Rank: Rear Admiral
- Commands: National Security Agency; Office of Naval Intelligence; Destroyer Flotilla Four; USS Manchester (CL-83); USS Greer (DD-145)
- Conflicts: World War II; Korean War
- Awards: Navy Distinguished Service Medal; Silver Star (2); Legion of Merit (2); Bronze Star Medal

Laurence Hugh Frost (July 22, 1902 – May 23, 1977) was a rear admiral in the United States Navy who served as Director of Naval Intelligence and Director of the National Security Agency.

== Naval career ==
Frost graduated from the United States Naval Academy in 1926, and served on various ships and shore stations throughout the 1920s and 1930s. He was the commanding officer of USS Greer (DD-145) when that destroyer was attacked by a German U-boat on 4 September 1941. This was the first attack by Germany on a United States warship during World War II and occurred while the United States was officially neutral, some three months before America entered the war.

After decorated service in World War II, Frost was assigned to Naval Intelligence and later saw combat as commander of the cruiser USS Manchester (CL-83) in the Korean War. He was chief of staff to Commander First Fleet in 1952. He commanded Destroyer Flotilla Four, United States Atlantic Fleet in 1955–1956 and was Director of Naval Intelligence from 1956 until 1960. As head of Naval Intelligence he tried to change the United States policy on the rebellion in Indonesia.

Frost became director of the National Security Agency (NSA) in November 1960 with the rank of vice admiral. He held this post until 1962. Holding these posts during the beginning of the space race, Frost was involved in early decisions to promote surveillance satellites such as the navy's ELINT program.

In an effort to reduce tensions, soon after his arrival at NSA, Frost appointed Robert F. Rinehart as chairman of the National Security Agency Scientific Advisory Board specifically because he was the newest member of the board with only a few months' experience and so had fewer "pre-acquired biases" in Rinehart's words. According to the NSA, "In 1962, when Vice Admiral Laurence Frost was unexpectedly transferred from his position" Gordon Blake was his replacement.

After a final tour of duty at the Potomac River Naval Command, Frost retired in 1964. His papers are preserved at the Operational Archives Branch of the Naval Historical Center in Washington, D.C. He is listed as a rear admiral by the John F. Kennedy Presidential Library, which holds an 11-page transcription of an oral interview he gave in 1970. As of 2004 portions of it remain "closed".

During his career, Frost was awarded the Navy Distinguished Service Medal, the Silver Star with one gold award star, and the Legion of Merit with one gold award star and a Combat "V".

Government offices
| Preceded by John A. Samford | Director of the National Security Agency; 1960–1962 | Succeeded by Gordon A. Blake |
