= Ralph Canine =

United States Army general

Ralph J. Canine
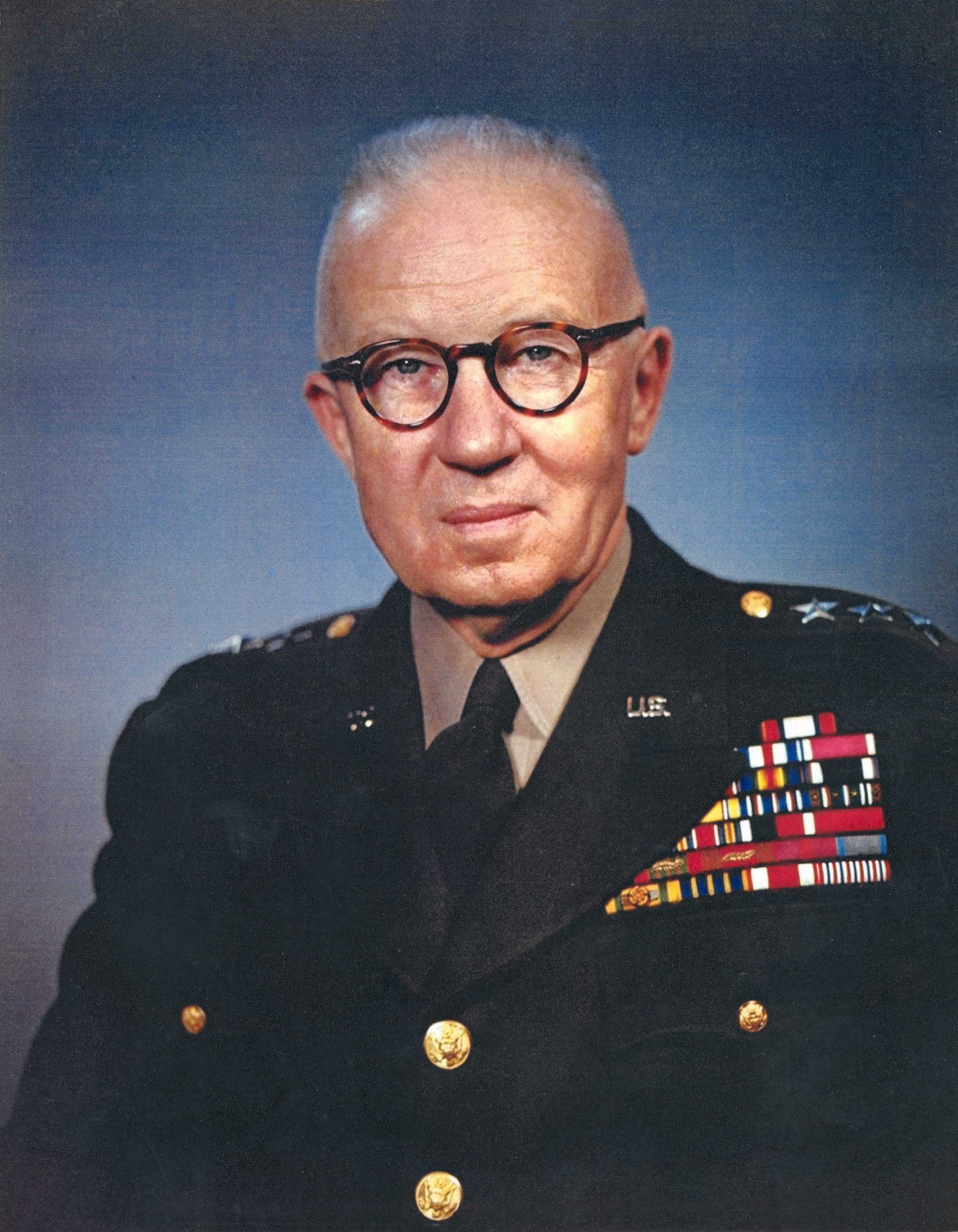
- Ralph Canine
- Born: November 9, 1895; Flora, Indiana, US
- Died: March 8, 1969 (aged 73); Washington, D.C., US
- Burial place: Arlington National Cemetery
- Military career
- Allegiance: United States
- Branch: United States Army
- Service years: 1917–1957
- Rank: Lieutenant General
- Commands: National Security Agency; Armed Forces Security Agency; 1st Infantry Division
- Conflicts: World War I World War II
- Awards: Army Distinguished Service Medal (2); Silver Star; Legion of Merit

Ralph Julian Canine (November 9, 1895 – March 8, 1969) was a lieutenant general in the United States Army and the first director of the National Security Agency.

== Early life and education ==
Canine was born in 1895 in Flora, Indiana, one of two children of the local superintendent of schools. When he left home, he was intent on being a doctor, and had completed pre-med studies at Northwestern University when he entered the United States Army during World War I and was commissioned a second lieutenant.

== Military career ==
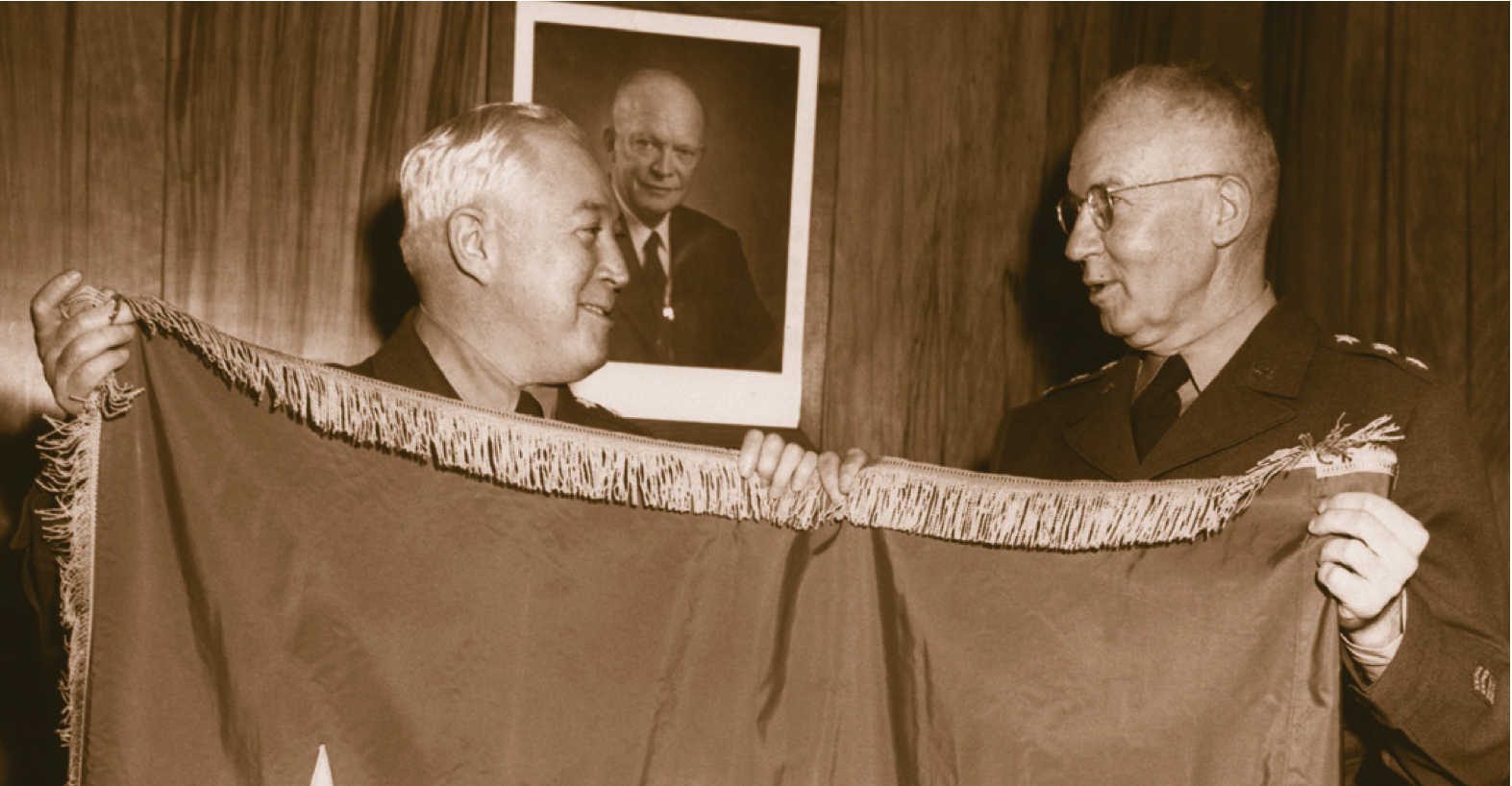
Canine (right) becoming the first Director of the National Security Agency in 1953

Canine served in various combat posts in France during World War I, and elected to stay in the army after the armistice was signed in 1918. The interwar period was his education, when he traveled from one army post to another, filling just about any job that was vacant. When World War II broke out, Canine was well-fitted for responsibility. He became the chief of staff for the XII Corps, which served in General George S. Patton's Third Army during its race across France in 1944. In that capacity, he was twice decorated by the Union of Soviet Socialist Republics receiving the Order of the Patriotic War First Class and Bravery Medal when XII Corps linked up with Red Army units. After the war, he was rewarded with command of the 1st Infantry Division.

In 1951 Canine became director of the Armed Forces Security Agency, which was America's first tentative step toward cryptologic unification. He was there long enough (one year) to see what the organization lacked. When President Harry S. Truman created the National Security Agency in 1952, Canine continued as its first director. He died unexpectedly of a pulmonary embolism in March 1969. He was buried in Arlington National Cemetery.

Government offices
New office	Director of the National Security Agency; 1952–1956	Succeeded by John A. Samford
