= John A. Samford =

United States Air Force general (1905–1968)

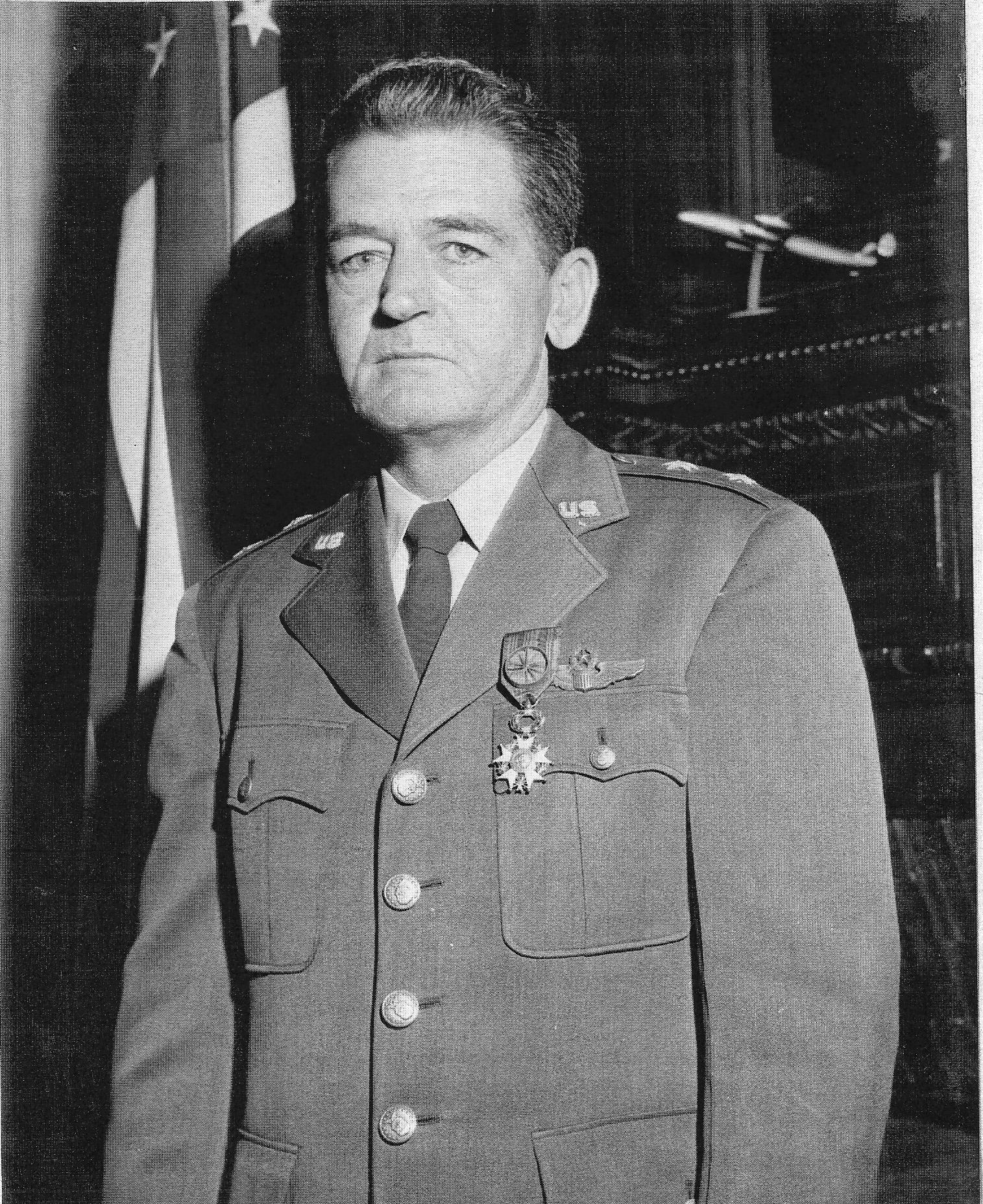
- Born: August 29, 1905; Hagerman, New Mexico, United States
- Died: November 20, 1968 (aged 63); Washington D.C., United States
- Military career
- Allegiance: United States
- Branch: United States Air Force
- Service years: 1928–1960
- Rank: Lieutenant General
- Commands: National Security Agency; Air War College; Air Command and Staff School; 24th Composite Wing
- Conflicts: World War II
- Awards: Army Distinguished Service Medal; Legion of Merit (2)

John Alexander Samford (August 29, 1905 – December 1, 1968) was a lieutenant general in the United States Air Force who served as Director of the National Security Agency (NSA).

== Early life and education ==
Samford as a United States Military Academy cadet c. 1928

Samford was born in Hagerman, New Mexico, in 1905. He graduated from high school in 1922 and then spent one year at Columbia University in New York City. In 1924, he received a senatorial appointment to the United States Military Academy. He graduated in 1928, ranking 131st in a class of 260.

== Military career ==
Samford graduated from the United States Military Academy at West Point in 1928 and entered the Army Air Corps as a second lieutenant that same year. Samford's first assignment was that of a student officer at Brooks Field, Texas. In 1929, he received his pilot wings at Kelly Field and was eventually rated a command pilot.

Samford was next assigned to Fort Crockett, located at Galveston, Texas. In 1930, he returned to Kelly Field where he served as a flying instructor. In 1934, he was ordered to an Engineering and Armament School at Chanute Field, Illinois. From 1935 until 1942, he held various assignments in Panama, Virginia, Louisiana, and Florida.

Samford was assistant chief of staff, G-1, Headquarters Third Air Force, in Tampa, Florida, when appointed chief of staff of the VIII Air Force Composite Command located in Northern Ireland.

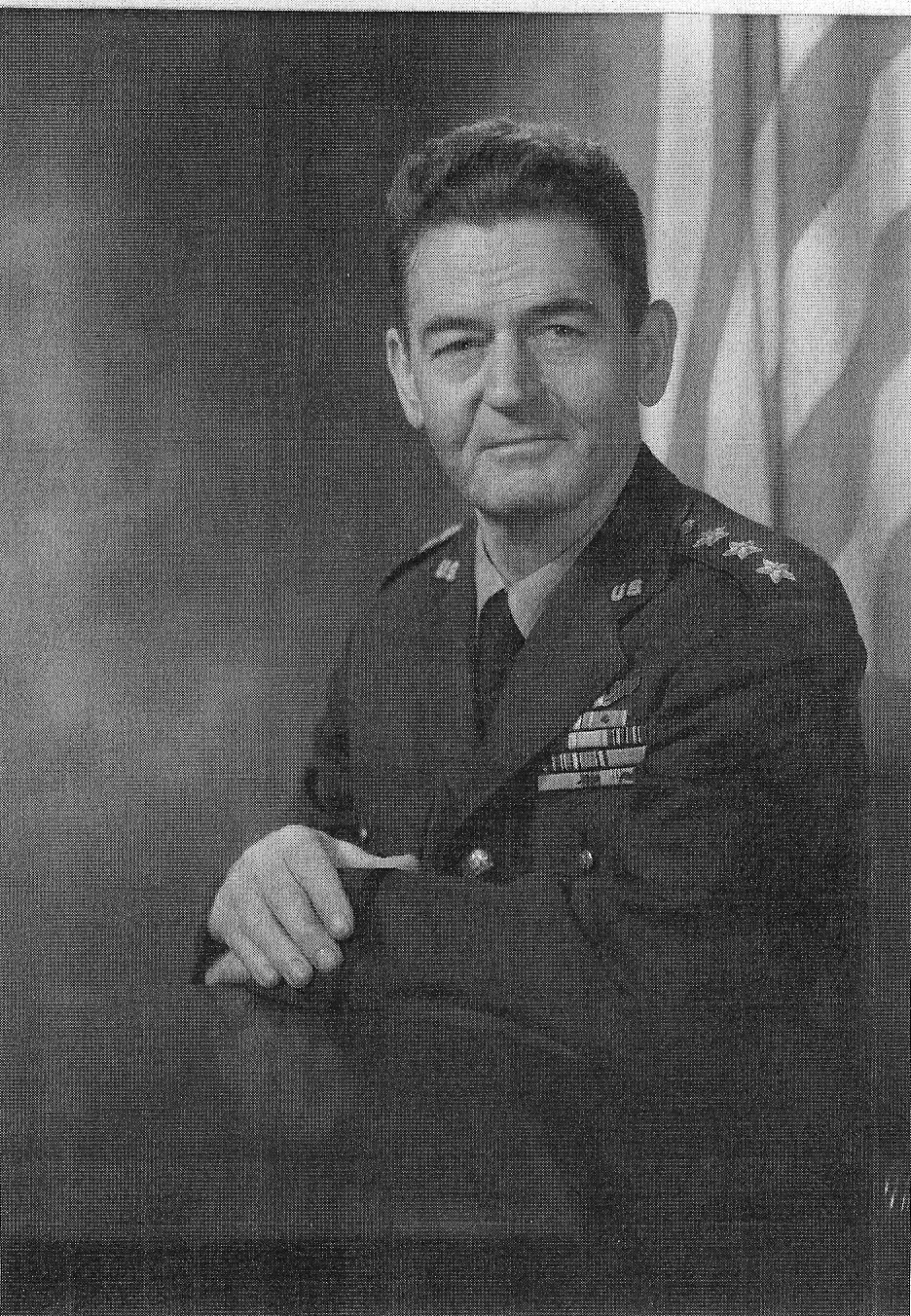
Lieutenant General Samford.

In 1943, Samford was appointed deputy chief of staff of the Eighth Air Force, and later chief of staff of the VIII Bomber Command. During World War II, he became deputy chief of staff of the 8th Air Force and the 8th Bomber Command in Britain. In 1944, he was made chief of staff of the 8th Air Force. Shortly after that, he received his first major intelligence assignment as deputy assistant chief of staff, A-2, at Army Air Force Headquarters, a position he held until 1947. Lieutenant General Samford also served on the Joint Targeting Group, which identified possible targets for Air Force bombing. While on this group, he participated in placing Hiroshima and Nagasaki on a target list without, however, knowing anything about the atomic bomb or the fact that this was a list of possible targets for it.

In 1944, Samford was promoted to brigadier general and appointed chief of staff of the Eighth Air Force. In October 1944 he was appointed deputy assistant chief of staff, A-2, Headquarters U.S. Army Air Forces.

In January 1947, Samford was appointed commander, 24th Composite Wing, which soon thereafter became the Antilles Air Division of the Caribbean Air Command.

In May 1949, Samford was appointed commandant of the Air Command and Staff School. He was promoted to major general in 1950 and held a brief appointment as commandant of the Air War College at Maxwell Field in Montgomery, Alabama, before being appointed director of intelligence for the United States Air Force in 1951. He held this position until his nomination to become Director of NSA in 1956. He served as Vice Director of NSA for five months before becoming DIRNSA on 24 November 1956.

It was during Samford's tenure as director of Air Force intelligence that Project Blue Book, which investigated unidentified flying objects (UFOs) was started. On July 29, 1952, Samford conducted a press conference at the Pentagon related to UFOs. Samford was mentioned at the beginning of the 1956 film UFO, which examined the phenomena of unidentified flying objects.

Samford served as Vice Director of the NSA from June to August 1956. In November, Samford was appointed director of the NSA and promoted to lieutenant general. As Director, Lieutenant General Samford continued the organization of NSA with the establishment of the Offices of Central Reference (CREF) and General Studies (GENS), the later establishment of the Advanced Weaponry and Astronautics Division (GENS 6), and the merger of NSA's Far Eastern Office (NSAFE) and Pacific Office (NSAPAC).

His tour of duty as Director was a period of mixed blessings. William Martin and Bernon Mitchell defected to the Soviet Union, Victor Norris Hamilton went public in the pages of a Tass release, and four aerial reconnaissance flights were shot down by the Russians, including Gary Powers's U-2. On the other hand, there were a number of major technical advances during this period. The first Soviet missile data signal, FLIM FLAM; the first Soviet submarine LINDUM signal; the first COZY signal; and the first Soviet aircraft YOGA signal all were intercepted while he was Director; and the first U.S. signals intelligence satellite, GRAB/DYNO-1, was launched.

Lieutenant General Samford officially opened the new NSA Headquarters Building at Fort Meade in 1957 and presided over the first annual NSA Christmas Party in December 1958. After his retirement from the Air Force in 1960, he lived in Washington, DC, until his death on 20 November 1968, at age 63. His successor as NSA director was Admiral Laurence H. Frost. He died on November 20, 1968, in Washington, DC.

== Awards ==
- Command Pilot Wings
- Army Distinguished Service Medal
- Legion of Merit with oak leaf cluster
- Air Medal
- American Defense Service Medal
- American Campaign Medal
- European-African-Middle Eastern Campaign Medal
- World War II Victory Medal
- National Defense Service Medal
- Officer, Legion of Honor (France)

Government offices
Preceded by Ralph J. Canine	Director of the National Security Agency; 1956–1960	Succeeded by Laurence H. Frost
Preceded by John Ackerman	Deputy Director of the National Security Agency; June – August 1956	Succeeded by Joseph H. Ream
