= Gordon Blake =

United States general

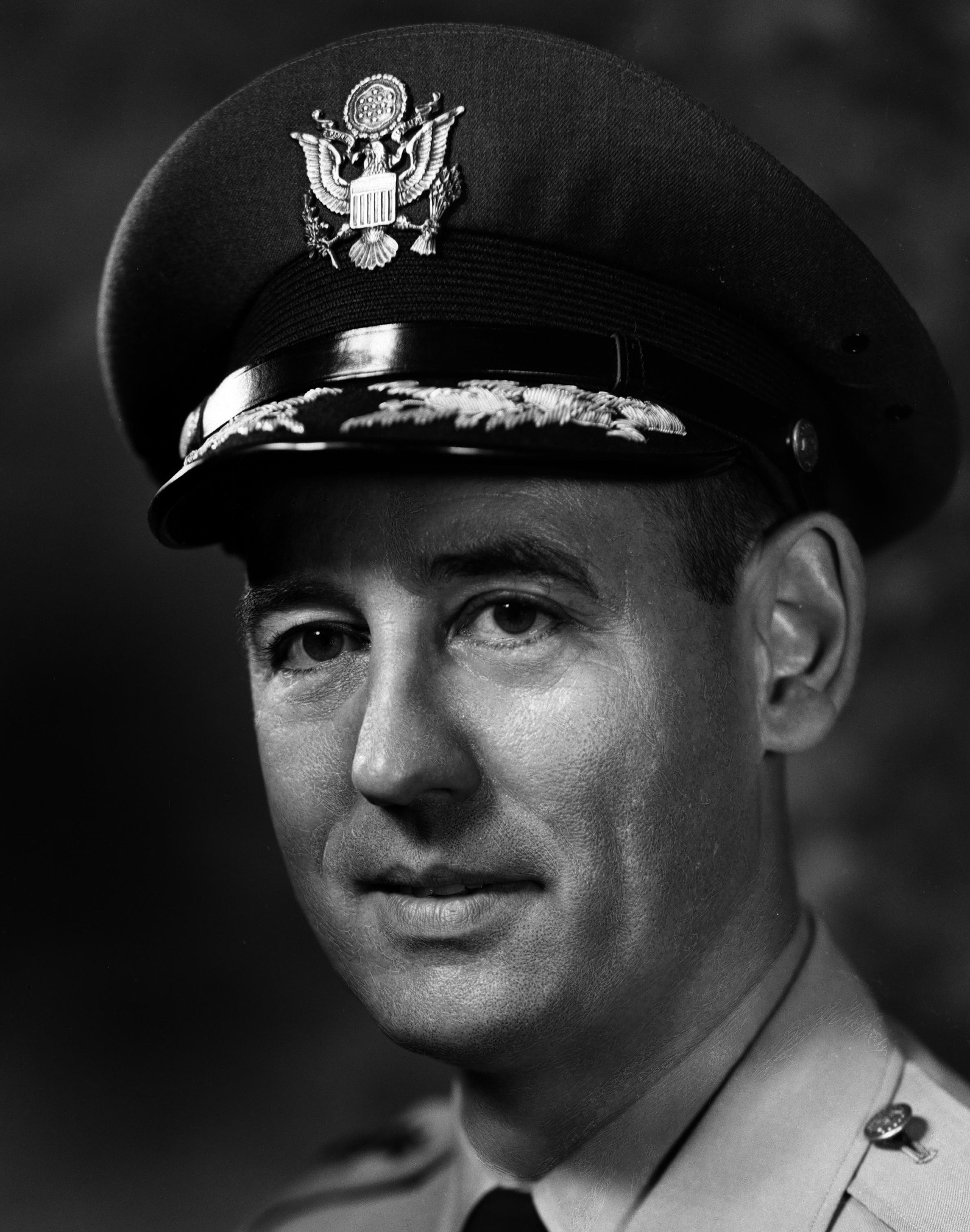
- Gordon Aylesworth Blake
- Born: July 22, 1910; Charles City, Iowa
- Died: September 1, 1997 (aged 87)
- Military career
- Allegiance: United States
- Branch: United States Air Force
- Service years: 1931–1965
- Rank: Lieutenant general
- Commands: National Security Agency; Continental Air Command; United States Air Force Security Service
- Conflicts: World War II
- Awards: Air Force Distinguished Service Medal (2); Silver Star; Legion of Merit (2); Distinguished Flying Cross (2); Air Medal (2)

Gordon Aylesworth Blake (July 22, 1910 – September 1, 1997) was a lieutenant general in the United States Air Force who served as director of the National Security Agency from 1962 to 1965.

== Early life and training ==
Gordon Aylesworth Blake was born in Charles City, Iowa, on July 22, 1910, the son of George and Cecelia Blake. He graduated from high school in Charles City and was appointed to the United States Military Academy by the late Gilbert N. Haugen in 1927, graduating on June 11, 1931. He was commissioned a second lieutenant in the Coast Artillery Corps and detailed as a student officer to pilot training.

In October 1932, Blake completed Primary and Advanced Flying Schools. He was transferred to the Air Corps on January 25, 1933, and was assigned to a pursuit squadron at Barksdale Field, Louisiana. Entering the Signal School at Fort Monmouth, New Jersey, in July 1934, he completed the Communications Officers' Course the following June and was assigned as communications instructor at the Air Corps Technical School, at Chanute Field, Illinois.

== World War II ==
Going to Hawaii in February 1939, Blake was communications officer of the 18th Composite Wing. During September 1941, he acted as communications officer on the first land-based aircraft flight from Hawaii to the Philippines. This flight was made in B-17 bombers sent to the Philippines as reinforcements and flew a pioneer route – Midway Island; Wake Island; Port Moresby, New Guinea; Darwin, Australia; Clark Field, Philippine Islands. All members of the flight were awarded the Distinguished Flying Cross.

On December 7, 1941, Blake was base operations officer (in the rank of major) at Hickam Field during the Japanese attack on Pearl Harbor and was awarded the Silver Star for gallantry in action that day. He became operations officer, Seventh Air Force Base Command, was promoted to lieutenant colonel, and spent the first months of World War II supervising operation of the airplane ferry route to Australia via Christmas Island – Canton Island – Fiji – New Caledonia.

In October 1942, Blake shifted back to communications work and commanded Army Airways Communications System in the Pacific for the rest of World War II, with the exception of the period October 1943 to January 1944, when on temporary duty in Alaska, he established the Air Communications Office for Alaska. He was promoted to colonel in November 1942. On August 28, 1945, he accompanied a special 150-man task force into Japan to prepare for airborne occupation troop landings on August 30.

== Post-war ==
For his work in World War II, Blake was awarded the Legion of Merit by Admiral Chester W. Nimitz, plus an oak leaf cluster to the Legion of Merit by the War Department, the Air Medal with oak leaf cluster, and battle stars for participation in the following campaigns: Central Pacific, Eastern Mandates, New Guinea, North Solomons, Guadalcanal, Papua and South Philippines, Luzon and Western Pacific. He returned from overseas in November 1945, and in January 1946, was appointed deputy commander of the Airways and Air Communications Service at Langley Field, Virginia.

Entering the Air War College at Maxwell Air Force Base, Alabama, in August 1947, Blake graduated the following June and went to research and development work at Wright-Patterson Air Force Base, Ohio. Between 1948 and 1951, he was with the Electronics Subdivision of the Engineering Division and served as chief of the Armament Laboratory. In the summer of 1951, he was placed in charge of 12 development laboratories and promoted to brigadier general. His final assignment at Wright Field was as vice-commander from June 1952 to January 1953.

Transferred to Air Force Headquarters in January 1953, Blake was appointed deputy director of communications in the Office of the Deputy Chief of Staff for Operations, becoming director of communications the following month. Many changes to the United States Air Force system for global communications and navigation, including pioneer operational circuits using tropospheric scatter communications for the first time, were carried out during his tour as director of communications.

=== Washington and other moves ===
Blake was named assistant deputy chief of staff for operations on June 2, 1956. In this capacity he served on the Permanent Joint Board for Defense, Canada — US, under which many defense projects such as the Dewline radar network were planned between the two countries. During the latter part of his Washington assignment, he was given the aeronautical rating of command pilot and was promoted to major general, the highest permanent rank in the regular service.

Blake left Washington on January 4, 1957, to become commander of the United States Air Force Security Service, a major component of the United States Air Force with its headquarters in San Antonio, Texas. He was awarded the Air Force Distinguished Service Medal for exceptionally meritorious conduct in the performance of outstanding service in this command.

On September 1, 1959, Blake was assigned as vice-commander-in-chief and chief of staff, Pacific Air Forces, the air arm of the joint Pacific Command with its headquarters in Hawaii.

Blake came to Headquarters Continental Air Command in July 1961 as commander-designate. He assumed command of Continental Air Command on September 30, 1961, and became a lieutenant general on October 1, 1961. Blake assumed the position of director, National Security Agency, at Fort George G. Meade, Maryland, July 1, 1962, which he held until his retirement in 1965.

The US Air Force Aircraft Save Award is named after him. It is awarded for any action taken by an air traffic controller or airfield manager that results in the safe recovery of an imperiled airborne aircraft or help given to an endangered aircraft on the ground.

== Decorations ==

USAF Command Pilot wings
1st Row	Air Force Distinguished Service Medal with Oak Leaf Cluster		Silver Star
2nd Row	Legion of Merit with Oak Leaf Cluster	Distinguished Flying Cross	Air Medal with Oak Leaf Cluster
3rd Row	Army Commendation Medal	American Defense Service Medal with Base Clasp	American Campaign Medal
4th Row	Asiatic-Pacific Campaign Medal with four service star	World War II Victory Medal	National Defense Service Medal with Oak Leaf Cluster
5th Row	Air Force Longevity Service Award with seven Oak Leaf Clusters	Philippine Liberation Medal with two stars	Philippine Independence Medal

Government offices
Preceded by Laurence Hugh Frost	Director of the National Security Agency; 1962–1965	Succeeded by Marshall S. Carter
