= Noel Gayler =

United States Navy admiral (1914–2011)

Noel A. M. Gayler
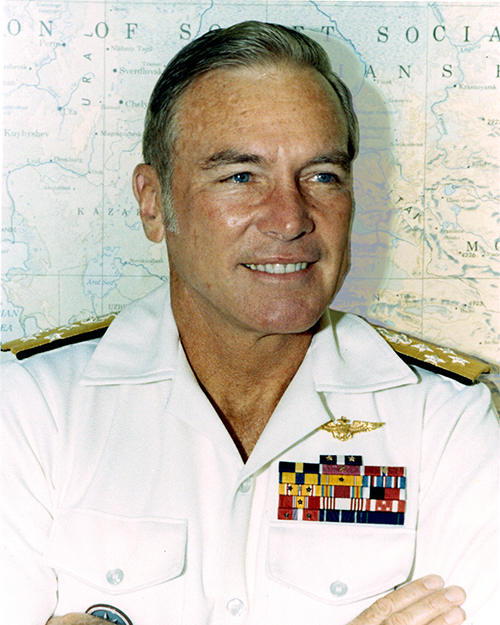
- Born: December 25, 1913; Birmingham, Alabama, U.S.
- Died: July 14, 2011 (aged 97); Alexandria, Virginia, U.S.
- Military career
- Allegiance: United States
- Branch: United States Navy
- Service years: 1935–1976
- Rank: Admiral
- Commands: United States Pacific Command; USS Ranger; USS Greenwich Bay; VX-3; VF-12
- Conflicts: World War II; Cold War; Vietnam War
- Awards: Navy Cross (3); Defense Distinguished Service Medal; Navy Distinguished Service Medal (2); Legion of Merit (2); Bronze Star Medal

Noel Arthur Meredyth Gayler (/ˈɡaɪlər/ GHY-lər; December 25, 1913 – July 14, 2011) was an admiral in the United States Navy, who served as the sixth Director of the National Security Agency from 1969 to 1972, and ninth Commander of Pacific Command from 1972 to 1976. Gayler was awarded three Navy Cross medals as a World War II flying ace and is credited with five aerial victories while flying for VF-2 and VF-3. Gayler was an ardent advocate for nuclear disarmament.

Gayler died July 14, 2011, in Alexandria, Virginia.

== Awards and decorations ==
Here is the ribbon bar of Admiral Noel A. M. Gayler:

Naval Aviator Badge
1st Row	Navy Cross with two Gold Stars		Defense Distinguished Service Medal
2nd Row	Navy Distinguished Service Medal with Gold Star	Legion of Merit with Gold Star	Bronze Star Medal with "V" Device
3rd Row	Navy Expeditionary Medal	American Defense Service Medal with Base Clasp	American Campaign Medal
4th Row	Asiatic-Pacific Campaign Medal with seven Service stars	World War II Victory Medal	Navy Occupation Service Medal
5th Row	National Defense Service Medal with service star	Order of Cultural Merit (Korea), 2nd class	Philippine Defense Medal
6th Row	Philippine Liberation Medal with two bronze stars	Navy Rifle Marksmanship Ribbon	Navy Pistol Marksmanship Ribbon

== See also ==
- Gray Eagle Award

Government offices
Preceded by Marshall Carter	Director of the National Security Agency; 1969–1972	Succeeded by Samuel C. Phillips
Military offices
Preceded by John S. McCain Jr.	Commander, United States Pacific Command; 1972–1976	Succeeded by Maurice F. Weisner
