= Lincoln D. Faurer =

United States Air Force general

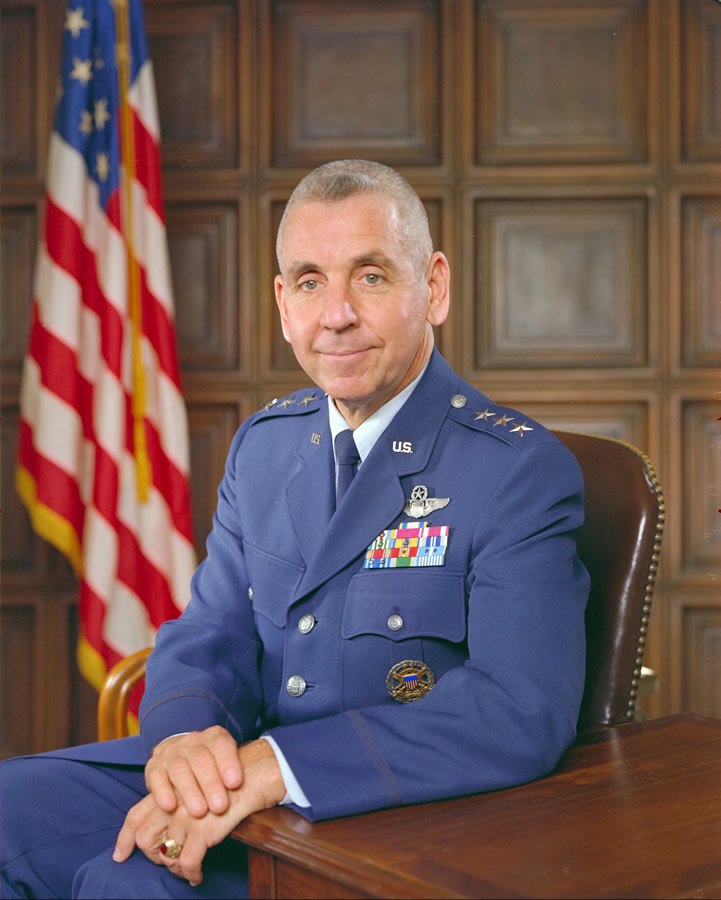
- Lieutenant General Lincoln D. Faurer
- Born: February 7, 1928; Medford, Massachusetts, U.S.
- Died: November 7, 2014 (aged 86); McLean, Virginia, U.S.
- Burial place: Arlington National Cemetery
- Military career
- Allegiance: United States
- Branch: United States Air Force
- Service years: 1950–1985
- Rank: Lieutenant general
- Nickname: Linc
- Commands: National Security Agency; 71st Missile Warning Wing; 16th Surveillance Squadron
- Conflicts: Korean War
- Awards: Air Force Distinguished Service Medal; Defense Superior Service Medal (2); Legion of Merit

Lieutenant General Lincoln D. Faurer (February 7, 1928 – November 7, 2014) was United States Air Force officer who served as director of the National Security Agency and chief of the Central Security Service from 1981 to 1985.

== Early life and education ==
Faurer was born February 7, 1928, in Medford, Massachusetts. He graduated from Central High School in Philadelphia in 1945 and attended Cornell University. He graduated from the United States Military Academy, West Point, New York, in 1950 with a Bachelor of Science degree and a commission as a second lieutenant. He received a Master of Science degree in Engineering Management from Rensselaer Polytechnic Institute, New York, in 1964. Faurer completed the National War College at Fort Lesley J. McNair, Washington, D.C., in 1968 and concurrently earned a master's degree in international affairs from the George Washington University, also in Washington, D.C.

== Military career ==
After graduation from the United States Military Academy, Faurer attended flying schools at Goodfellow Air Force Base, Texas, and Vance Air Force Base, Oklahoma, and received his pilot wings in August 1951. He completed B-29 pilot training at Randolph Air Force Base, Texas, in January 1952 and was then assigned to the 308th Bombardment Wing at Forbes Air Force Base, Kansas. In May 1952 he moved with the wing to Hunter Air Force Base, Georgia.

From April 1953 to September 1955, Faurer flew weather reconnaissance flights in WB-29s with the 56th Weather Reconnaissance Squadron at Yokota Air Base, Japan.

After aerial observer training at James Connally Air Force Base, Texas, Faurer returned to Forbes Air Force Base in May 1956 as an RB-47 aircraft commander with the 320th Strategic Reconnaissance Squadron. In May 1958 he transferred to Headquarters 90th Strategic Reconnaissance Wing, also at Forbes, as chief of the Training Procedures Section.

Faurer began his career in the missile and space fields in August 1959 when he was assigned to Headquarters 2nd Air Force, Barksdale Air Force Base, Louisiana, serving successively as an operations officer in the Missile Section; guided missiles operations officer; and chief, Missile Branch in the Training Division, Directorate of Operations. While at Barksdale he was associated with the 2nd Air Force's growing inventory of intercontinental ballistic missiles: Atlas D, E, F; Titan II; and Minuteman I.

Faurer attended the graduate engineer management program at Rensselaer Polytechnic Institute from June 1963 to July 1964. After graduation, he was assigned to the Defense Intelligence Agency in Washington, D.C., in the Directorate of Scientific and Technical Intelligence, and served as a technical intelligence officer; development engineer; and later as chief, Space Systems Division, in the Missiles and Space Office until July 1967.

Upon graduation from the National War College in July 1968, Faurer was named director of current operations, 14th Aerospace Force at Ent Air Force Base, Colorado. He then served as commander, 16th Surveillance Squadron at Shemya Air Force Base, Alaska, from August 1969 to September 1970, when he was appointed commander of the 71st Missile Warning Wing at McGuire Air Force Base, New Jersey.

Faurer was assigned as director, J-2, United States Southern Command, Canal Zone, in July 1971, and in June 1973 transferred to Headquarters U.S. Air Force, Washington, D.C., for duty as deputy assistant chief of staff for intelligence. In May 1974 Faurer returned to the Defense Intelligence Agency as deputy director for intelligence, and in July 1976 he became vice director for production. He was assigned as director, J-2, U.S. European Command in Vaihingen, West Germany, in August 1977, and moved to Brussels, Belgium, in August 1979 as deputy chairman of the North Atlantic Treaty Organization Military Committee. He became director of the National Security Agency in April 1981.

Faurer's military decorations and awards include the Air Force Distinguished Service Medal, Defense Superior Service Medal with oak leaf cluster, Legion of Merit, Meritorious Service Medal, Joint Service Commendation Medal with oak leaf cluster and Air Force Commendation Medal with oak leaf cluster. Faurer has also been presented the National Intelligence Medal of Achievement in recognition of his service to the national intelligence community.

Faurer was promoted to lieutenant general September 1, 1979, with same date of rank. He retired on April 1, 1985.

== Activities after retirement ==
Faurer was president of the Corporation for Open Systems, a not-for-profit industry research center for the promotion of OSI and ISDN international communications standards, from 1986 to 1991. He served as chairman of the Association for Intelligence Officers and consults on national security issues. During the 1990s, "Linc" Faurer also served on the board of directors for the Aegis Research Corporation of Rosslyn and later Falls Church, Virginia. He was chairman of the board of directors of the National Cryptologic Museum Foundation until October 2014.

Faurer died on November 7, 2014, and was buried in Arlington National Cemetery.

Government offices
Preceded by Bobby Ray Inman	Director of the National Security Agency; 1981–1985	Succeeded by William E. Odom
