= John E. Morrison =

US Air Force major general

John E. Morrison Jr.
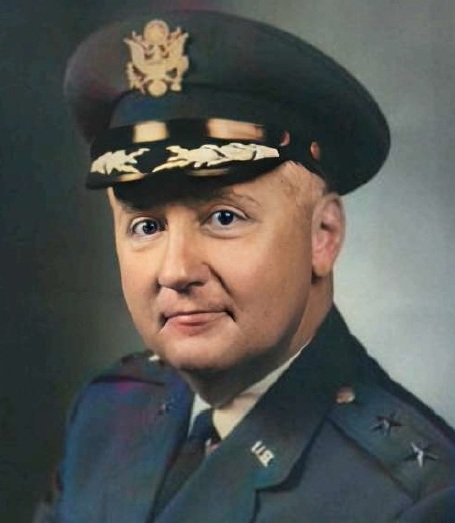
- Morrison as a major general c. 1968
- Born: 20 April 1918; Baltimore, Maryland, US
- Died: 11 January 2013 (aged 94); Davidsonville, Maryland, US
- Burial place: Arlington National Cemetery
- Alma mater: University of Baltimore School of Law; Air Command and Staff College; Air War College
- Spouse: Flora May Haupt (m. 1942)
- Children: 3
- Military career
- Service: United States Army; United States Air Force
- Service years: 1941–1947 (Army); 1947–1973 (Air Force)
- Rank: Major General
- Service number: 8459A
- Units: Air Force Communications Command; Air Force Security Service
- Commands: 6981st Radio Group Mobile; Air Force Special Communications Center; Chief, Policy and Objectives Division, Air Force Directorate of Telecommunications; National Security Agency, Pacific
- Wars: World War II
- Awards: National Intelligence Distinguished Service Medal; Legion of Merit (2); Bronze Star Medal (2); Air Force Commendation Medal; Army Commendation Medal (2)
- Other work: President and chairman of the board, National Cryptologic Museum Foundation; Executive vice president, Security Affairs Support Association

John E. Morrison (20 April 1918 – 11 January 2013) was a career officer in the United States military. A veteran of World War II, he served in the United States Army, United States Army Air Forces, and United States Air Force from 1941 to 1973 and attained the rank of major general. Morrison's commands included: 6981st Radio Group Mobile; Air Force Special Communications Center; Chief, Policy and Objectives Division, Air Force Directorate of Telecommunications; and National Security Agency, Pacific. Among his awards were the National Intelligence Distinguished Service Medal, two awards of the Legion of Merit, two awards of the Bronze Star Medal, the Air Force Commendation Medal, and two awards of the Army Commendation Medal.

A native of Baltimore, Morrison graduated from the University of Baltimore School of Law in 1939, then worked as a clerk for a Baltimore interior decorator. In 1941, he joined the U.S. Army Signal Corps for World War II. After receiving a commission in the Army Air Forces, he served in the Pacific Theater, where he took part in several campaigns. When the Air Force was created as a separate service in 1947, Morrison transferred from the Army Air Forces to the new organization.

After his wartime service, Morrison specialized in communications and intelligence. He graduated from the Air Command and Staff College and Air War College, and served as commander of communications and telecommunications units. He later served in senior roles with the Defense Communications Agency and National Security Agency, and he retired from the military in 1973. After leaving the Air Force, Morrison was a senior executive with the NSA until his retirement from government service in 1979. In retirement, he resided in Davidsonville, Maryland. He died in Davidsonville on 11 January 2013 and was buried at Arlington National Cemetery.

== Early life ==
John Ellsworth Morrison Jr. was born in Baltimore on 20 April 1918, a son of John E. Morrison Sr. and Ruth C. (Schano) Morrison. He was raised and educated in Baltimore and completed his early education at Baltimore City College in 1936. He went on to receive his LL.B. degree from the University of Baltimore School of Law in 1939. (Note: In 1970, the University of Baltimore made the switch from the LL.B. degree to the J.D., part of a trend at American law schools throughout the 1960s and 1970s. University of Baltimore alumni were offered the choice of maintaining their LL.B.s or converting them to J.D.s According to his obituary, Morrison converted his degree to a J.D.) After graduating from college, Morrison was employed as a clerk for a Baltimore interior decorator. In February 1941, Morrison enlisted for World War II and joined United States Army's 21st Signal Operations Company as a private. He subsequently attended Officer Candidate School and in February 1942 he was commissioned as a second lieutenant in the U.S. Army Signal Corps.

== Start of career ==
After receiving his commission, Morrison was posted to Washington, D.C. and assigned to the Signal Intelligence Service, a subordinate organization of the Army Air Forces. In January 1943, he was assigned to duty in the Pacific Theater and posted to the Army Airways Communications System. During his wartime service, Morrison participated in the invasions of Munda, Buka and Bougainville, the Green Islands, Emirau, and Luzon. Upon returning to the U.S. after the war, Morrison was assigned to Headquarters, Army Air Forces and appointed a branch chief in the Communications System Division of the Directorate of Communications, where he served from 1946 to 1949. When the United States Air Force was created as a separate service in September 1947, Morrison was transferred from the Army Air Forces to the new organization.

In July 1949, Morrison was assigned to attend the Air Command and Staff College. After graduating in 1950, he was assigned to the faculty. In July 1953, he was assigned to the United States Air Force Security Service and appointed to command of 6981st Radio Group Mobile. In February 1956, Morrison was assigned as assistant deputy chief of staff for operations at Headquarters U.S. Air Force Security Service. In June 1957, he was appointed to command the Air Force Special Communications Center, where he served until July 1958. He was then assigned to take the course at the Air War College, and he graduated in July 1959.

After his Air War College graduation, Morrison was assigned to Headquarters U.S. Air Force and appointed Air Force coordinator for the US Military Communications-Electronics Board. In July 1960, he was assigned as chief of the Policy and Objectives Division of the Air Force's Directorate of Telecommunications. In November 1961, he was designated assistant director of the Defense Communications Agency (DCA) for plans and programs. Morrison became executive assistant to the DCA director, then deputy chief of staff, and he remained with the DCA until July 1963.

== Continued career ==
In July 1963, Morrison was appointed to command National Security Agency (NSA), Pacific, and he served in this position until July 1966. He was then assigned to Headquarters, NSA, where he appointed deputy assistant director for production. In February 1968, Morrison was appointed assistant director for production. He served in this position until retiring from the military in 1973. After his military retirement, Morrison was employed by the NSA as a senior executive until his retirement from government service in 1979. Near the end of his military career, Morrison was credited with creation of the National Security Operations Center, a centralized watch center for processing and distributing intelligence so that military and civilian government leaders could make timely and accurate decisions. Morrison began to push for NSOC's creation following the 1969 EC-121 shootdown incident by North Korea, when he noted that disparate agency operations and watch centers had difficulty gaining and maintaining situational awareness.

After retiring, Morrison continued to reside in Davidsonville, Maryland. He was a founder of the Security Affairs Support Association (SASA) (now the Intelligence and National Security Alliance) and was the organization's longtime executive vice president. He was a board of directors member for the National Museum of Intelligence and Special Operations. He was also the founder of the National Cryptologic Museum Foundation (NCMF), of which he served as president and chairman of the board. In addition, he was a board of directors member for the Joint Military Intelligence College Foundation. He was a Scottish Rite Freemason, and maintained his membership in the organization for over 60 years. In 2001, Morrison was inducted into the National Security Agency Hall of Honor. Also in 2001, he was inducted into the NSA Cryptologic Hall of Honor. Morrison died in Davidsonville on 11 January 2013 and was buried at Arlington National Cemetery.

Morrison's legacy includes the NCMF's Major General John E. Morrison Award for Excellence and Innovation. As part of its participation in the Maryland History Day Competition, NCMF awards two cash prizes (grades 6 to 8 and 9 to 12) for outstanding projects that address topics related to the history of science and technology. The National Military Intelligence Foundation's annual recognition program included the John E. Morrison Award, which is presented to a top performing employee of the National Security Agency. In 2022, the NSA dedicated the Morrison Center on Fort Meade's East Campus. This building was constructed to provide a modern facility for the National Security Operations Center (NSOC) and other NSA and United States Cyber Command offices.

== Awards ==
Morrison's awards included:

- National Intelligence Distinguished Service Medal
- Legion of Merit with oak leaf cluster
- Bronze Star Medal with oak leaf cluster
- Air Force Commendation Medal
- Army Commendation Medal with oak leaf cluster
- American Defense Service Medal
- Asiatic–Pacific Campaign Medal
- American Campaign Medal
- World War II Victory Medal
- Air Force Longevity Service Award
- Philippine Liberation Medal (Philippines)
- Order of Military Merit, (Chungmu), (South Korea)
