= Director of the National Security Agency =

Highest-ranking official of the NSA of the U.S. DoD

- Seal of the National Security Agency

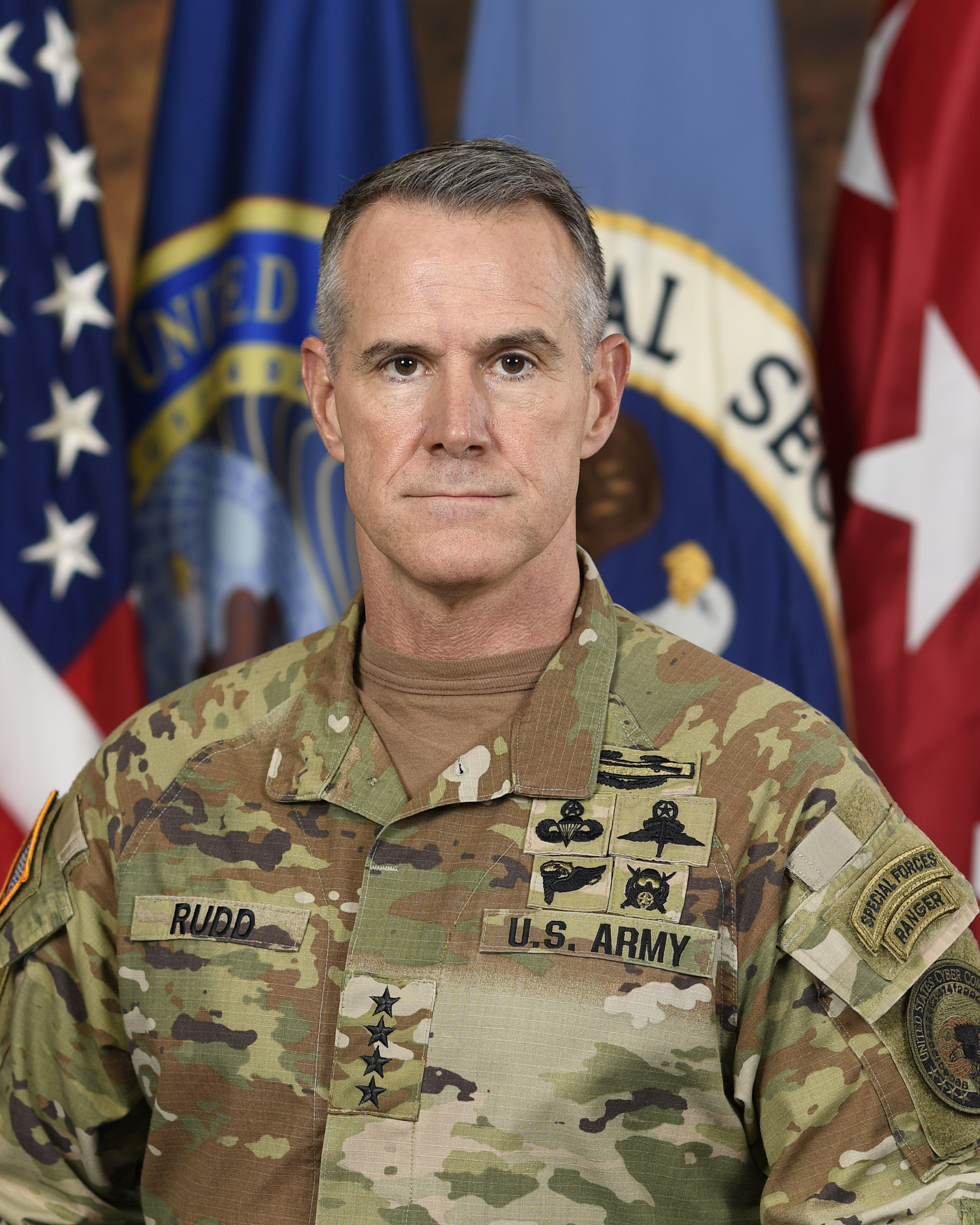
- Incumbent; General Joshua M. Rudd since 16 March 2026
- National Security Agency
- Status: Chief Executive
- Reports to: Under Secretary of Defense for Intelligence; Director of National Intelligence; Secretary of Defense
- Seat: Fort Meade, Maryland
- Nominator: Secretary of Defense
- Appointer: The president with Senate advice and consent
- Constituting instrument: 10 U.S.C. § 201
- Precursor: Director of the Armed Forces Security Agency
- Formation: 1952
- First holder: MG Ralph Canine, USA
- Deputy: Deputy Director
- Website: www.nsa.gov

The director of the National Security Agency (DIRNSA) is the highest-ranking official of the National Security Agency, which is a defense agency within the U.S. Department of Defense. The director of the NSA also concurrently serves as the chief of the Central Security Service (CSS) and as the commander of U.S. Cyber Command (USCYBERCOM). As the director of the NSA and the chief of the CSS, the officeholder reports to the under secretary of defense for intelligence, and as the commander of U.S. Cyber Command, the officeholder reports directly to the secretary of defense.

According to 10 U.S.C. § 201 of the United States Code, the director of the NSA is recommended by the secretary of defense and nominated for appointment by the president. The nominee must be confirmed via majority vote by the Senate. In accordance with Department of Defense Directive 5100.20, dated 23 December 1971, the director of the NSA must always be a commissioned officer of the military services. As the assignment is currently part of a tri-hatted position, the director of the NSA is appointed to the grade of a four-star general or admiral during the period of his incumbency. The director's deputy is always a technically experienced civilian.

== AFSA directors ==
The Armed Forces Security Agency was the predecessor to the National Security Agency and existed from 1949 to 1952.

No.	Director		Term			Service branch	President
No.	Portrait	Name	Took office	Left office	Term length	Service branch	President
1		Rear Admiral; Earl E. Stone	1949	1951	2 years	U.S. Navy	Harry S. Truman
2		Major General; Ralph Canine	1951	1952	1 year	U.S. Army	Harry S. Truman

== NSA directors ==
No.	Director		Term			Service branch	President
No.	Portrait	Name	Took office	Left office	Term length	Service branch	President
1		Lieutenant General; Ralph Canine	1952	1956	4 years	U.S. Army	Harry S. Truman; Dwight D. Eisenhower
2		Lieutenant General; John Samford	1956	1960	4 years	U.S. Air Force	Dwight D. Eisenhower
3		Vice Admiral; Laurence Frost	1960	1962	3 years	U.S. Navy	Dwight D. Eisenhower; John F. Kennedy
4		Lieutenant General; Gordon Blake	1962	1965	3 years	U.S. Air Force	John F. Kennedy; Lyndon B. Johnson
5		Lieutenant General; Marshall Carter	1965	1969	4 years	U.S. Army	Lyndon B. Johnson; Richard Nixon
6		Vice Admiral; Noel Gayler	1969	1972	3 years	U.S. Navy	Richard Nixon
7		Lieutenant General; Samuel C. Phillips	1972	1973	1 year	U.S. Air Force	Richard Nixon
8		Lieutenant General; Lew Allen	1973	1977	4 years	U.S. Air Force	Richard Nixon; Gerald Ford; Jimmy Carter
9		Vice Admiral; Bobby Ray Inman	1977	1981	4 years	U.S. Navy	Jimmy Carter; Ronald Reagan
10		Lieutenant General; Lincoln Faurer	1981	1985	4 years	U.S. Air Force	Ronald Reagan
11		Lieutenant General; William Odom	1985	1988	3 years	U.S. Army	Ronald Reagan
12		Vice Admiral; William Studeman	1988	1992	4 years	U.S. Navy	Ronald Reagan; George H. W. Bush
13		Vice Admiral; John M. McConnell	1992	1996	4 years	U.S. Navy	George H. W. Bush; Bill Clinton
14		Lieutenant General; Kenneth A. Minihan	1996	1999	3 years	U.S. Air Force	Bill Clinton
15		Lieutenant General; Michael Hayden	21 March 1999	21 April 2005	6 years, 31 days	U.S. Air Force	Bill Clinton; George W. Bush
16		General; Keith B. Alexander	1 August 2005	28 March 2014	8 years, 239 days	U.S. Army	George W. Bush; Barack Obama
17		Admiral; Michael S. Rogers	2 April 2014	4 May 2018	4 years, 32 days	U.S. Navy	Barack Obama; Donald Trump
18		General; Paul M. Nakasone	4 May 2018	2 February 2024	5 years, 274 days	U.S. Army	Donald Trump; Joe Biden
19		General; Timothy D. Haugh	2 February 2024	3 April 2025	1 year, 60 days	U.S. Air Force	Joe Biden; Donald Trump
–		Lieutenant General; William J. Hartman	3 April 2025	15 March 2026	346 days	U.S. Army	Donald Trump
20		General; Joshua M. Rudd	16 March 2026	Incumbent	176 days	U.S. Army	Donald Trump
