= Intelligence and National Security Alliance =

Security Agency in Arlington

- Industry: Public-Private Collaboration
- Founded: 1979
- Founder: Security Affairs Support Association
- Headquarters: Arlington, Virginia
- Key people: Suzanne Wilson Heckenberg (President)
- Members: Public, Private and Academic Members of the Intelligence and National Security Community
- Website: insaonline.org

The Intelligence and National Security Alliance (INSA) is a non-profit, nonpartisan 501(c)(6) professional organization based in Arlington, Virginia for the public and private sector members of the United States Intelligence Community.

== History ==
INSA was founded in 1979 as the Security Affairs Support Association (SASA) by several military and civilian intelligence professionals including Len Moodispaw and John E. Morrison. Their intent was to bring together professionals in the intelligence field, primarily focused on the National Security Agency, and to assist members in staying current on intelligence and national security community issues. SASA's headquarters were in Annapolis Junction, Maryland.

== DOD SkillBridge Fellowship ==
INSA has a memorandum of understanding with the United States Department of Defense that recognizes it as an official partner of the DOD SkillBridge Program. Beginning in 2022, INSA began welcoming DOD SkillBridge Fellows.

== Events and IC Outreach ==
=== William Oliver Baker Award Dinner ===
The William Oliver Baker Award was established by SASA in 1984 to honor achievements in the intelligence sector. The award is named in honor of the first recipient, William O. Baker. To celebrate each award recipient, INSA holds an annual William Oliver Baker Award Dinner.

Baker Award recipients
Year	Awardee
1984	Dr. William O. Baker
1985	Senator Barry Goldwater (R-Az.)
1986	Ambassador Vernon A. Walters
1987	Ambassador Richard Helms
1988	Dr. Edwin H. Land
1989	Admiral Bobby Inman, USN
1990	Dr. Lew Allen
1991	James R. Schlesinger
1992	Dr. Louis W. Tordella
1993	Dr. Albert D. Wheelon
1994	Robert J. Hermann
1995	John N. McMahon
1996	LTG Samuel V. Wilson, USA (Ret.)
1997	Judge William H. Webster
1998	Dr. Jack E. Thomas
1999	Ann Z. Caracristi
2000	William J. Perry
2001	Dr. Sidney D. Drell
2002	Mr. Charles E. Allen
2003	George J. Tenet
2004	Joan A. Dempsey
2005	Lt Gen Brent Scowcroft, USAF (Ret.)
2006	Lt Gen James R. Clapper, Jr., USAF
2007	Admiral William Oliver Studeman, USN
2008	Richard James Kerr
2009	Former Senator John Warner (R-Va.)
2010	Secretary of Defense Robert Gates
2011	Mike McConnell
2012	Arthur L. Money
2013	General Michael V. Hayden
2014	Congressman Dutch Ruppersberger
2015	Congressman Mike Rogers
2016	John E. McLaughlin
2017	Robert Mueller
2018	Stephanie O'Sullivan
2019	General Keith B. Alexander
2021	Susan M. Gordon
2022	Governor Tom Ridge
2023	Lieutenant General Vincent Stewart
2024	General Paul M. Nakasone
2025	Former CIA director William J. Burns

=== Achievement Awards ===
The INSA Charlie Allen Achievement Awards were established in 2010. INSA holds the Achievement Awards annually, granting six awards that differ in their mission and service requirements. The six awards are:

- Richard J. Kerr Government Award
- John W. Warner Homeland Security Award
- Edwin H. Land Industry Award
- Joan A. Dempsey Mentoring Award
- William O. Studeman Military Award
- Sidney D. Drell Academic Award

=== Intelligence and National Security Summit ===
The Intelligence and National Security Summit is an annual event held by both INSA and the Armed Forces Communications & Electronics Association International (AFCEA). Its purpose is to bring public and private sector leaders together to advance collaborative solutions to critical intelligence and national security challenges. The Summit is a two-day program that features five plenaries and six breakout sessions that examine contemporary issues in intelligence and national security.

=== Intelligence and National Security Foundation ===
INSA is affiliated with the Intelligence and National Security Foundation, a 501(c)(3) nonprofit organization that raises funds from individuals and organizations across the intelligence community to sponsor scholarships and programming.
