= Mike McConnell (U.S. Naval officer) =

United States admiral (born 1943)

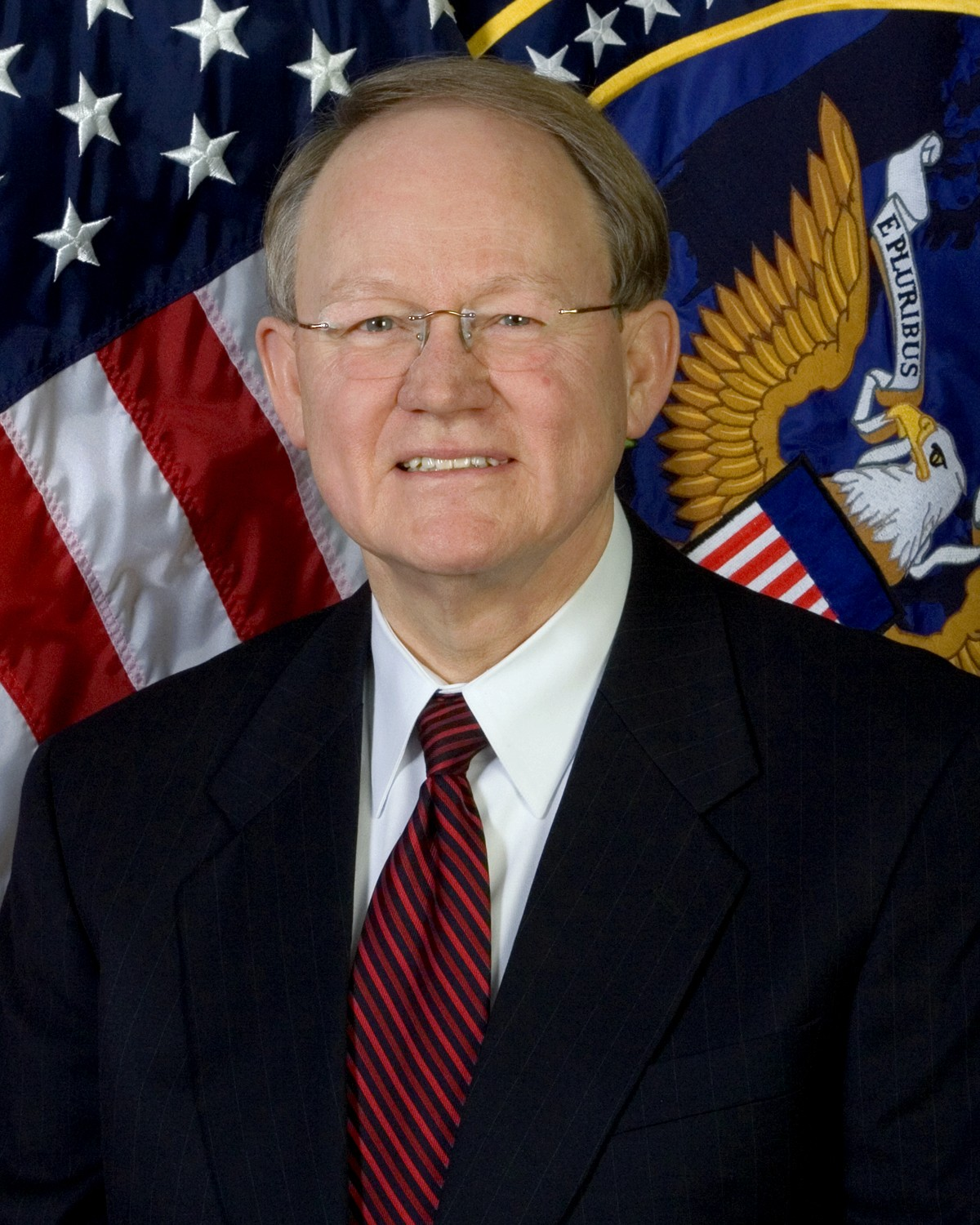

2nd Director of National Intelligence
- In office February 20, 2007 – January 20, 2009
- President: George W. Bush
- Preceded by: John Negroponte
- Succeeded by: Dennis C. Blair

Director of the National Security Agency
- In office May 1992 – February 1996
- President: George H. W. Bush; Bill Clinton
- Preceded by: Bill Studeman
- Succeeded by: Kenneth Minihan

Personal details
- Born: July 26, 1943 (age 83) Greenville, South Carolina, U.S.
- Education: North Greenville University (attended); Furman University (BA); George Washington University (MPA)

Military service
- Allegiance: United States
- Branch/service: United States Navy
- Years of service: 1967–1996
- Rank: Vice Admiral
- Battles/wars: Vietnam War; Gulf War
- Awards: Defense Superior Service Medal; Legion of Merit

J. Michael "Mike" McConnell (born July 26, 1943) is a former vice admiral in the United States Navy. He served as Director of the National Security Agency from 1992 to 1996 and as the United States Director of National Intelligence from February 2007 to January 2009 during the Bush administration and first week of the Obama administration. As of January 2024, he is the Vice Chairman at Booz Allen Hamilton.

== Early life, education, and family ==
McConnell was born and grew up in Greenville, South Carolina. He graduated from Wade Hampton High School (Greenville, South Carolina) in 1964, and first attended college at North Greenville Junior College, later earning a Bachelor of Arts in Economics from Furman University. He holds a Master of Public Administration from George Washington University, and is a graduate of the National Defense University and the National Defense Intelligence College (Strategic Intelligence). He is married to Terry McConnell, and together they have four children and nine grandchildren.

== Military and intelligence career ==
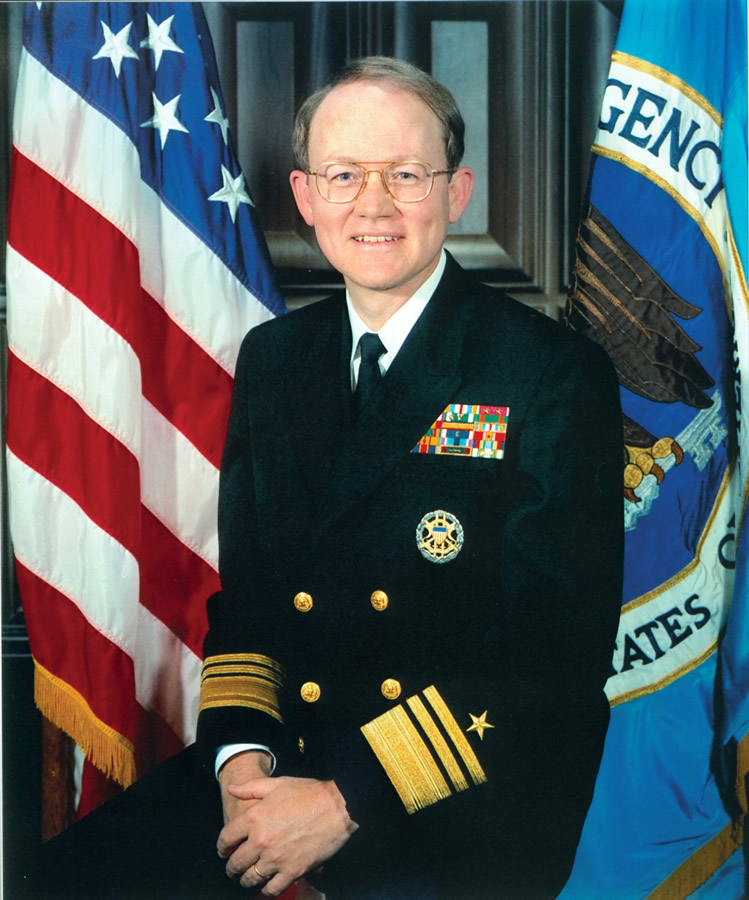
McConnell's official NSA portrait, 1992.

McConnell received his commission in the United States Navy in 1967. He worked as the Intelligence Officer (J2) for the Chairman of the Joint Chiefs of Staff and the United States Secretary of Defense during Operation Desert Shield/Storm and the dissolution of the Soviet Union. He developed approaches for improving information flow among intelligence agencies and combat forces in the Gulf War.

From 1992 to 1996, McConnell served as Director of the National Security Agency (NSA). He led NSA as it adapted to the multi-polar threats brought about by the end of the Cold War. Under his leadership, NSA routinely provided global intelligence and information security services to the White House, Cabinet officials, the United States Congress, and a broad array of military and civilian intelligence customers. He also served as a member of the Director of Central Intelligence senior leadership team to address major intelligence programmatic and substantive issues from 1992 until 1996.

In 1996, McConnell retired from the Navy as a vice admiral after 29 years of service – 26 as a career Intelligence Officer. In addition to many of the nation's highest military awards for meritorious service, he holds the nation's highest award for service in the Intelligence Community. He also served as the Chairman of the Intelligence and National Security Alliance.

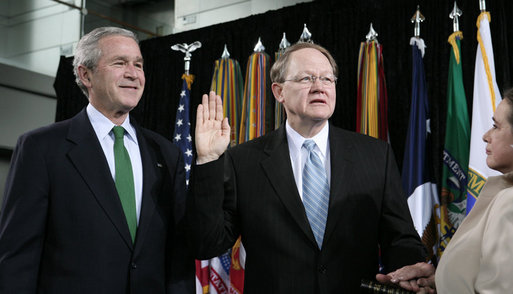
McConnell is sworn in as DNI, February 20, 2007.

McConnell was the second person to hold the position of Director of National Intelligence. He was nominated by President George W. Bush on January 5, 2007, and was sworn in at Bolling Air Force Base in Washington, D.C., on February 20, 2007. McConnell's appointment to the post was initially greeted with broad bipartisan support, although he has since attracted criticism for advocating some of the Bush administration's more controversial policies.

Before his nomination as DNI, McConnell had served as a Senior Vice President with the consulting firm Booz Allen Hamilton, focusing on the Intelligence and National Security areas. From 2005 until his confirmation as DNI in 2007, he was also chairman of the board of the Intelligence and National Security Alliance, the "premier not-for-profit, nonpartisan, private sector professional organization providing a structure and interactive forum for thought leadership, the sharing of ideas, and networking within the intelligence and national security communities" whose members include leaders in industry, government, and academia.

On Tuesday, August 14, 2007, McConnell visited Texas with House Intelligence Committee chairman Silvestre Reyes to review border security, and granted a wide-ranging interview to the El Paso Times newspaper, which surprised many in the intelligence community for its candor on sensitive topics such as the recent changes in the Foreign Intelligence Surveillance Act and the NSA warrantless surveillance controversy. At the end of the interview, McConnell cautioned reporter Chris Roberts that he should consider whether enemies of the U.S. could gain from the information he just shared, leaving it up to the paper to decide what to publish. The El Paso Times put the entire, unexpurgated interview on their website on August 22, with executive editor Dionicio Flores saying "I don't believe it damaged national security or endangered any of our people."

A resurgent Taliban is back in charge over parts of Afghanistan, McConnell told CNN on February 27, 2008, in an assessment that differed from the one made in January 2008 by Defense Secretary Robert Gates.

On January 24, 2009, it was announced that McConnell would return to Booz Allen as a Senior Vice President.

== Initiatives as DNI ==
=== 100 Day Plan for Integration and Collaboration ===
DNI Seal

Two months after taking office, McConnell created a series of initiatives designed to build the foundation for increased cooperation and reform of the U.S. Intelligence Community (IC). His plan, dubbed "100 Day Plan for Integration and Collaboration" focused on efforts to enable the IC to act as a unified enterprise in a collaborative manner. It focused on six enterprise integration priorities:

1. Create a Culture of Collaboration
2. Foster Collection and Analytic Transformation
3. Build Acquisition Excellence and Technology Leadership
4. Modernize Business Practices
5. Accelerate Information Sharing
6. Clarify and Align DNI's Authorities

Subsequently, a 500 Day Plan was designed to sustain the momentum with an expanded set of initiatives and a greater level of participation. It was set to deepen integration of the Community's people, processes, and technologies. The plan addressed a new performance management framework that entails six performance elements that all agencies must have.

=== 500 Day Plan for Integration and Collaboration ===
The 100 Day Plan was meant to "jump start" a series of initiatives based on a deliberate planning process with specific deadlines and measures to ensure that needed reforms were implemented. The 500 Day Plan, which started in August 2007, was designed to accelerate and sustain this momentum with an expanded set of initiatives and broader IC participation. It contains 10 "core" initiatives which will be tracked by the senior leadership in the Intelligence Community, and 33 "enabling" initiatives. The initiatives are based on the same six focus areas described in the 100 Day Plan.

The top initiatives are:

1. Treat Diversity as a Strategic Mission Imperative
2. Implement Civilian IC Joint Duty Program
3. Enhance Information Sharing Policies, Processes, and Procedures
4. Create Collaborative Environment for All Analysts
5. Establish National Intelligence Coordination Center
6. Implement Acquisition Improvement Plan
7. Modernize the Security Clearance Process
8. Align Strategy, Budget, and Capabilities through a Strategic Enterprise Management System
9. Update Policy Documents Clarifying and Aligning IC Authorities

Director McConnell ended office near the 400th day of his 500-day plan.

=== Updating FISA ===
McConnell approached Congress in early August 2007 on the need to "modernize FISA," claiming two changes were needed (initial efforts began in April – see the factsheet for more). First, the Intelligence Community should not be required, because of technology changes since 1978, to obtain court orders to effectively collect foreign intelligence from "foreign targets" located overseas. He also argued that telecoms being sued for violating the nation's wiretapping laws must be protected from liability—regardless of the veracity of the charges. Shortly thereafter, McConnell took an active role on Capitol Hill for legislation being drafted by Congress. On August 3, McConnell announced that he "strongly oppose[d]" the House's proposal because it wasn't strong enough. After heated debate, Congress updated FISA by passing the Protect America Act of 2007.

In that same testimony, McConnell blamed the death of a kidnapped American soldier in Iraq on the requirements of FISA and the slowness of the courts. However, a timeline later released showed that the delays were mostly inside the NSA, casting doubt again on McConnell's truthfulness.

McConnell, speaking to a Congressional panel in defense of the Protect America Act, said that the Russian and Chinese foreign intelligence services are nearly as active as during the Cold War. In other September 18, 2007 testimony before the House Judiciary Committee, McConnell addressed the NSA warrantless surveillance controversy, saying that that agency had conducted no telephone surveillance of Americans without obtaining a warrant in advance since he became Director of National Intelligence in February, 2007. McConnell called FISA a "foundational law" with "important legacy of protecting the rights of Americans," which was passed in the era of Watergate and in the aftermath of the Church and Pike investigations. He stressed that changes should honor that legacy for privacy and against foreign threats.

=== Analytic Outreach ===
July 2008, Director McConnell issued a directive (ICD 205) for analysts to build relationships with outside experts on topics of concern to the intelligence community—a recommendation highlighted in the WMD Commission Report.

=== Updating Executive Order 12333 ===
Director McConnell worked with the White House to overhaul Executive Order 12333, which outlines fundamental guidance to intelligence agencies. McConnell believes the update is necessary to incorporate the intelligence community's new organizations and new technologies and methods. The redo is expected to help the intelligence agencies work together, and to reflect the post 9/11 threat environment.

In July 2008, President Bush issued Executive Order 13470, which amended 12333.

=== Information Integration and Sharing ===
As one of McConnell's last acts as DNI, he signed ICD501 "Discovery and Dissemination or Retrieval of Information Within the Intelligence Community" to dramatically increase access to several databases held by various agencies in the community. The policy establishes rules to govern disputes when access is not granted, with the DNI as the final adjudicator to resolve disputes between organizations. He also established the Intelligence Information Integration Program (I2P) under the leadership of then-CIO Patrick Gorman and then NSA-CIO Dr. Prescott Winter. The goal of I2P was to create a shared infrastructure and family of shared services as a means to increase information access, sharing and collaboration throughout the US Intelligence Community.

=== Integrated Planning, Programming and Budgeting System ===
McConnell led the effort to create an integrated planning, programming, and budgeting system to more fully integrate and optimize the capabilities of the Intelligence Community. Previously, each agency's budget was developed independently and aggregated for Congress. After the issuance of ICD106 Strategic Enterprise Management (IC SEM), the Intelligence Community budget was more closely aligned to strategic goals and objectives, requirements, and performance criteria. ICD 106 was replaced by ICD 116 in 2011 ().

== Years after DNI ==
In early April 2010, Admiral McConnell called for expanding the powers of the DNI by giving him tenure and creating a Department of Intelligence for the DNI to oversee and fully control to settle the continued fighting amongst agencies within various departments. On February 12, 2020, Admiral McConnell was named the executive director of Cyber Florida. Cyber Florida is a state-funded organization hosted at USF that works with all 12 public universities in Florida, as well as private industry, government and the military to build partnerships and develop programs that grow and strengthen Florida's cybersecurity industry.

== Career overview ==
- USS Colleton (APB-36), Mekong Delta, 1967–1968
- Naval Investigative Service, Japan, 1968–1970
- Commander of Middle East Force Operations, 1971–1974
- Executive assistant to Director of Naval Intelligence, 1986–1987
- Chief of Naval Forces Division at National Security Agency, 1987–1988
- Director of Intelligence (N2) Commander in Chief Pacific Fleet, 1989–1990
- Intelligence director for Joint Chiefs of Staff, 1990–1992
- Director of NSA, 1992–1996
- Senior Vice President Booz Allen Hamilton, 1996–2006
- Director of National Intelligence, 2007–2009
- Executive Vice President Booz Allen Hamilton, 2009–2012
- Advisory Board Member of the Council on CyberSecurity, 2013
- Executive Director, Cyber Florida. 2020–present.

Government offices
Preceded by Bill Studeman	Director of the National Security Agency; 1992–1992	Succeeded by Kenneth Minihan
Preceded by John Negroponte	Director of National Intelligence; 2007–2009	Succeeded by Dennis Blair
