= Kenneth Minihan =

United States Air Force general (1943–2025)

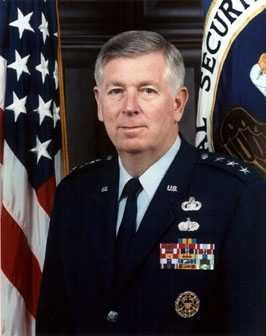

14th Director of the National Security Agency
- In office 16 February 1996 – 1999
- President: Bill Clinton
- Preceded by: John M. McConnell
- Succeeded by: Michael Hayden

12th Director of the Defense Intelligence Agency
- In office 1995 – 16 February 1996
- President: Bill Clinton
- Preceded by: James R. Clapper
- Succeeded by: Patrick M. Hughes

Personal details
- Born: 31 December 1943 Pampa, Texas, U.S.
- Died: 1 November 2025 (aged 81)
- Education: Florida State University
- Profession: Intelligence officer

Military service
- Allegiance: United States
- Branch: United States Air Force
- Service years: 1966–1999
- Rank: Lieutenant General
- Commands: Air Intelligence Agency; Air Force Intelligence Command; 6917th Electronic Security Group; 12th Tactical Intelligence Squadron; 6941st Electronic Security Squadron
- Conflict: Vietnam War
- Awards: Defense Distinguished Service Medal; Legion of Merit (3); Bronze Star Medal; Defense Meritorious Service Medal; Meritorious Service Medal (4)

Kenneth A. Minihan (31 December 1943 – 1 November 2025) was a United States Air Force lieutenant general who served as the director of the National Security Agency and the Defense Intelligence Agency, retiring on 1 May 1999.

== Early life and career ==
Minihan was born in Pampa, Texas, on 31 December 1943. He entered the United States Air Force in 1966 as a distinguished graduate of the Reserve Officer Training Corps program at Florida State University, where he was also a member of Phi Kappa Psi. He served as senior intelligence officer for the air force and in other senior staff officer positions in The Pentagon; Headquarters Tactical Air Command, Langley Air Force Base, Virginia; Electronic Security Command, Kelly Air Force Base, Texas; the Defense Intelligence Agency, Washington, D.C.; and the National Security Agency, Fort George G. Meade, Maryland. He has commanded squadrons, groups and a major air command, both in the United States and overseas. He has been the assistant chief of staff, intelligence, Headquarters United States Air Force, Washington, D.C., and director of the Defense Intelligence Agency.

== Personal life and death ==
After retiring from the United States Air Force, Minihan served as the president of the Security Affairs Support Association from 1999 until 2002 and as a Managing Director with the Paladin Capital Group. His son, Mike Minihan also became a USAF officer and was, until 9 September 2024, commander of Air Mobility Command at the rank of General.

Kenneth Minihan died on 1 November 2025, at the age of 81.

== Education ==
- 1966 Bachelor of Arts degree in political science, Florida State University, Tallahassee
- 1972 Squadron Officer School, Maxwell Air Force Base, Alabama
- 1979 Distinguished graduate, Master of Arts degree in national security affairs, Naval Postgraduate School, Monterey, California
- 1979 Air Command and Staff College, Maxwell Air Force Base, Alabama
- 1984 Distinguished graduate, Air War College, Maxwell Air Force Base, Alabama
- 1993 Program for Senior Executives in National and International Security, Harvard University, Massachusetts

== Assignments ==
- September 1962 – June 1966, Air Force Reserve Officer Training Corps program, Florida State University, Tallahassee
- June 1966 – November 1966, student, Armed Forces Intelligence Center, Lowry Air Force Base, Colorado
- November 1966 – October 1969, intelligence plans officer, Headquarters Tactical Air Command, Langley Air Force Base, Virginia
- October 1969 – November 1970, target intelligence officer and commander's briefer, Headquarters 7th Air Force, Tan Son Nhut Air Base, South Vietnam
- November 1970 – September 1974, chief, current intelligence and presentations branch, Headquarters U.S. Southern Command, Howard Air Force Base, Panama
- September 1974 – July 1978, program element monitor, assistant executive; assistant chief of staff, intelligence; and special assistant for external affairs, Headquarters U.S. Air Force, Washington, D.C.
- July 1978 – December 1979, student, Naval Postgraduate School, Monterey, California
- January 1980 – September 1981, legislative liaison officer, Defense Intelligence Agency, Washington, D.C.
- September 1981 – December 1982, chief, Office of Support to Military Operations and Plans, National Security Agency, Fort George G. Meade, Maryland
- December 1982 – July 1983, commander, 6941st Electronic Security Squadron, Fort George G. Meade, Maryland
- July 1983 – May 1984, student, Air War College, Maxwell Air Force Base, Alabama
- May 1984 – July 1985, commander, 12th Tactical Intelligence Squadron, Bergstrom Air Force Base, Texas
- July 1985 – July 1987, commander, 6917th Electronic Security Group, San Vito dei Normanni Air Station, Italy
- July 1987 – June 1989, deputy chief of staff, plans, Headquarters Electronic Security Command, Kelly Air Force Base, Texas
- June 1989 – July 1991, deputy chief of staff, intelligence, Headquarters Tactical Air Command, Langley Air Force Base, Virginia
- July 1991 – June 1993, director of plans and requirements, assistant chief of staff, intelligence, Headquarters U.S. Air Force, Washington, D.C.
- June 1993 – October 1993, commander, Air Force Intelligence Command and director, Joint Electronic Warfare Center, Kelly Air Force Base, Texas
- October 1993 – October 1994, commander, Air Intelligence Agency and director, Joint Command and Control Warfare Center, Kelly Air Force Base, Texas
- October 1994 – September 1995, assistant chief of staff, intelligence, Headquarters U.S. Air Force, Washington, D.C.
- September 1995 – 16 February 1996, director, Defense Intelligence Agency, Washington, D.C.
- 16 February 1996 – April 1999, director, National Security Agency and Central Security Service, Fort George G. Meade, Maryland

== Major awards and decorations ==
- Defense Distinguished Service Medal
- Legion of Merit with two oak leaf clusters
- Bronze Star
- Defense Meritorious Service Medal
- Meritorious Service Medal with three oak leaf clusters
- National Security Medal
- National Intelligence Distinguished Service Medal
- National Defense Service Medal with service star
- Vietnam Service Medal with four service stars
- Republic of Vietnam Gallantry Cross Unit Citation
- Republic of Vietnam Campaign Medal

== Sources ==
Government offices
Preceded by John M. McConnell	Director of the National Security Agency; 1996–1999	Succeeded by Michael V. Hayden
Preceded by James R. Clapper	Director of the Defense Intelligence Agency; 1995–1996	Succeeded by Patrick M. Hughes
