= William O. Studeman =

United States Navy admiral (born 1940)

William Oliver Studeman
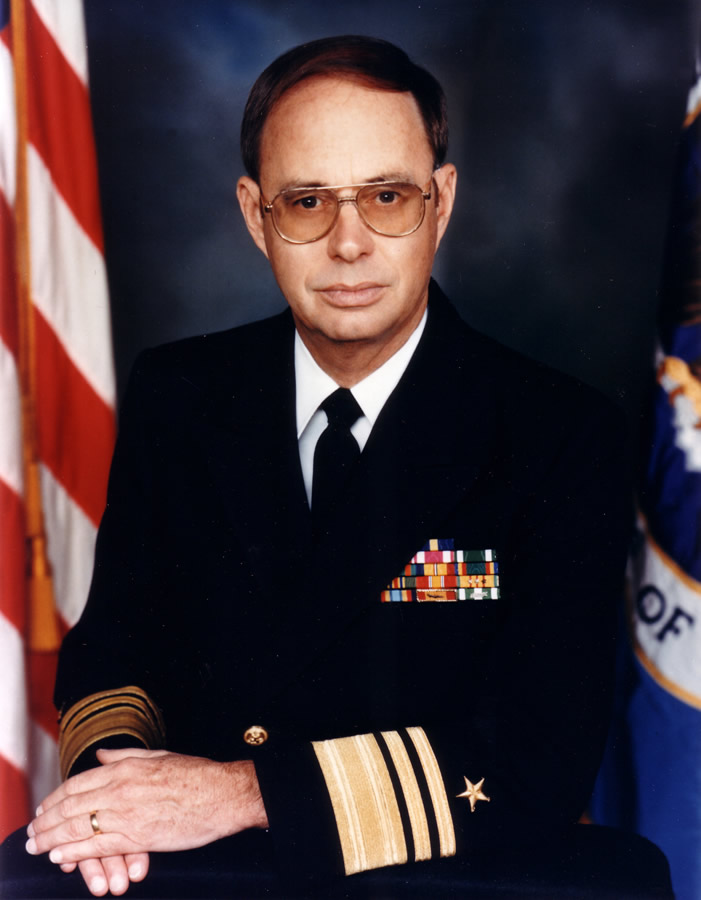
- Admiral William Oliver Studeman c. 1988
- Born: January 16, 1940 (age 86); Brownsville, Texas, U.S.
- Relatives: Rear Adm. Michael W. Studeman (son)
- Military career
- Allegiance: United States
- Branch: United States Navy
- Service years: 1962–1995
- Rank: Admiral
- Commands: National Security Agency; Office of Naval Intelligence; Navy Operational Intelligence Center
- Conflicts: Vietnam War
- Awards: Navy Distinguished Service Medal; Legion of Merit (3)
- Other work: Deputy Director Central Intelligence Agency

William Oliver Studeman (born January 16, 1940) is a retired admiral of the United States Navy and former deputy director of the Central Intelligence Agency, with two extended periods as acting Director of Central Intelligence. As deputy director of Central Intelligence, he served in the administrations of George H. W. Bush and Bill Clinton under three directors of Central Intelligence, Robert Gates, R. James Woolsey Jr., and John M. Deutch. Studeman retired from the Navy in 1995 after almost 35 years of service. Between 1988 and 1992 he was director of the National Security Agency; he was the Director of Naval Intelligence, from September 1985 to July 1988.

On 6 February 2004, Studeman was appointed to the Iraq Intelligence Commission, an independent panel tasked with investigating U.S. intelligence surrounding the United States' 2003 invasion of Iraq and Iraq's weapons of mass destruction (WMD).

Studeman retired in 2005 from Northrop Grumman Corporation as vice president and deputy general manager of mission systems. In this position, he focused on strategies, programs, business development, and marketing related to intelligence and information warfare, as well as corporate cross-sector integration, and on managing technology partnerships and concepts related to NetCentricity ISR, IO/IW and advanced command environments. He served in this position for approximately 9 years.

Studeman has served on corporate boards, and government, university and corporate advisory boards. He was recently a commissioner on the Presidential Commission on WMD, and is currently serving on National Advisory Board on Bio-Security and the Public Interest Declassification Board. He is also a member of the Defense Science Board as well as the National Geospatial-Intelligence Agency Advisory Board, Defense Intelligence Agency Joint Military Intelligence College, National Reconnaissance Office, national labs and other advisory boards. He is chairman of the board of the Naval Intelligence Foundations, and is a member of the board of the National Cryptologic Museum Foundation.

In June 1962, he received a B.A. degree in history from the University of the South in Sewanee, Tennessee. Studeman later earned an M.A. degree in public and international affairs from George Washington University's Elliott School of International Affairs in June 1973. While in the Navy, he also was a distinguished graduate of the Naval War College and National War College, as well as the recipient of an honorary doctorate in strategic intelligence from the Defense Intelligence College. He will receive a second honorary doctorate degree this fall from the University of the South.

Studeman is the recipient of numerous service commendations and citations, including the Navy Distinguished Service Medal, the Legion of Merit with two Gold Stars. In 2007 Studeman was awarded the William Oliver Baker Award by the Intelligence and National Security Alliance. He also has received service medals from the Governments of France, Brazil, and South Korea.

His son, Michael, is a retired Navy two-star admiral.

Government offices
Preceded by William E. Odom	Director of the National Security Agency; 1988–1992	Succeeded by Mike McConnell
Preceded by Richard J. Kerr	Deputy Director of Central Intelligence; 1992–1995	Succeeded by George Tenet
