= John N. McMahon =

CIA deputy director

15th Deputy Director of the Central Intelligence Agency
- In office April 27, 1982 – March 26, 1986
- President: Ronald Reagan
- Preceded by: Bobby Ray Inman
- Succeeded by: Robert Gates

Personal details
- Born: July 3, 1929 (age 96) East Norwalk, Connecticut, U.S.
- Spouse: Margaret Joan Hugger (m. 1952)
- Children: 4
- Education: College of the Holy Cross (BA)

Military service
- Allegiance: United States

John Norman McMahon (born July 3, 1929) is an American intelligence analyst who served as the 15th deputy director of the Central Intelligence Agency (CIA) from 1982 to 1986.

== Early life and education ==
McMahon was born on July 3, 1929, in East Norwalk, Connecticut. His parents were Frederick Francis McMahon and Elizabeth Collins. He had a sister who was a cryptanalyst. After high school, he graduated from the College of the Holy Cross in Worcester, Massachusetts, with a Bachelor of Arts in English literature in 1951. As an undergraduate at Holy Cross, he wrote a senior thesis titled, "The Emotional Conflict of Four of Shakespeare's Tragic Heroines".

== Career ==
=== CIA ===
McMahon became acquainted with the Office of Strategic Services (OSS), the precursor of the CIA, when he was a student at the College of the Holy Cross, where the intelligence agency had posted a recruiting agent. After graduation, he enrolled at the Georgetown University Law Center and attended classes during the day and worked as a switchboard operator at the OSS at night. He ultimately left the law school after his first semester in order to pursue communications training in Germany in 1952 under the OSS.

McMahon joined the CIA in 1951 or 1966. He served as Deputy Director for Operations from January 11, 1978, to April 12, 1981, and later, nominated by US President Ronald Reagan, as Deputy Director of Central Intelligence under Director William J. Casey as of April 27, 1982, succeeding Bobby Ray Inman. Questioning McMahon during his nomination included US Senators Daniel Patrick Moynihan (who guided publication of the VENONA papers in the mid-1990s).

On March 4, 1986, McMahon, age 56, resigned and left office on March 26, succeeded by Robert M. Gates. "McMahon had clashed with Capitol Hill conservatives who considered him less than zealous in his support of aid to guerrilla fighters in Afghanistan and Nicaragua." President Reagan expressed regret at his resignation.

=== Lockheed Martin ===
In August 1986, McMahon joined Lockheed Martin Corporation as an executive vice president for plans and programs in its Missiles & Space Company. In 1995, McMahon was president and CEO of Lockheed Missiles & Space Co.

In 2004, McMahon was registered as a lobbyist for the Lockheed Martin Corporation.

== Post-career ==
In May 2015, 20 ex-CIA officials, including McMahon, signed a letter opposing the decision by The New York Times to publish the names of three undercover officers working for the CIA.

== Awards ==
- 1995: Distinguished Public Service Medal from NASA

== Personal life ==
On April 15, 1952, McMahon married Margaret Joan Hugger, with whom he had four children: Patricia Joy, Christopher John, Timothy Richard, and Peter Collins.

== External sources ==
- Wilson Center: JOHN N. MCMAHON, DEPUTY DIRECTOR FOR NATIONAL FOREIGN ASSESSMENT, TO AMBASSADOR RICHARD T. KENNEDY, UNDER SECRETARY OF STATE FOR MANAGEMENT, 'SPECIAL NATIONAL INTELLIGENCE ESTIMATE ON INDIAN REACTIONS TO NUCLEAR DEVELOPMENTS IN PAKISTAN,' 31-32/81
- U.S. Senate: Nomination of John N. McMahon: Hearing Before the Select Committee on Intelligence of the United States Senate, Ninety-seventh Congress, Second Session, on Nomination of John N. McMahon to be deputy director of Central Intelligence (May 26, 27, 1982)
- US Department of State: Memorandum From the Deputy Director of Central Intelligence (McMahon) to the Deputy Director for Intelligence (Gates) (1982)
- Central Intelligence Agency: Statement of John N. McMahon, Deputy Director of Central Intelligence (April 13, 1984)
- Central Intelligence Agency: An Interview with Former DDCI John N. McMahon (1997–1998)

Government offices
Preceded by Bobby Ray Inman	Deputy Director of Central Intelligence; June 10, 1982 – March 29, 1986	Succeeded by Robert Gates
