= Richard James Kerr =

Deputy Director of the Central Intelligence Agency
- In office March 20, 1989 – March 2, 1992
- President: George H. W. Bush
- Preceded by: Robert Gates
- Succeeded by: Bill Studeman

Personal details
- Born: October 4, 1935 (age 90)
- Education: University of Oregon (B.A.)

Richard James Kerr (born October 4, 1935) was Deputy Director of the Central Intelligence Agency from 1989 to 1992.

He was born in Fort Smith, Arkansas. He received a B.A. in history from the University of Oregon and started graduate work there too. Kerr had a 32-year career with the CIA which included involvement in the retaliatory bombing raids against Libya in 1986, and culminated with key roles in managing U.S. intelligence related to the near nuclear stand-off between India and Pakistan in 1990, and the attempted coup against Boris Yeltsin in August, 1991.

In 1991, Kerr was presented with the Presidential Citizens Medal by President George H. W. Bush.

From 1996 to 2002, "Dick" Kerr also served on the Board of Directors for the Aegis Research Corporation of Rosslyn and later Falls Church, Virginia. He continues to serve on corporate boards and is a compliance observer of the 1998 Good Friday Agreement.

He is interviewed in the 2024 BBC documentary The Secret Army.

== Sources ==
- Congressional Record
- 911 Review.org
