= Robert Gates =

American intelligence analyst (born 1943)

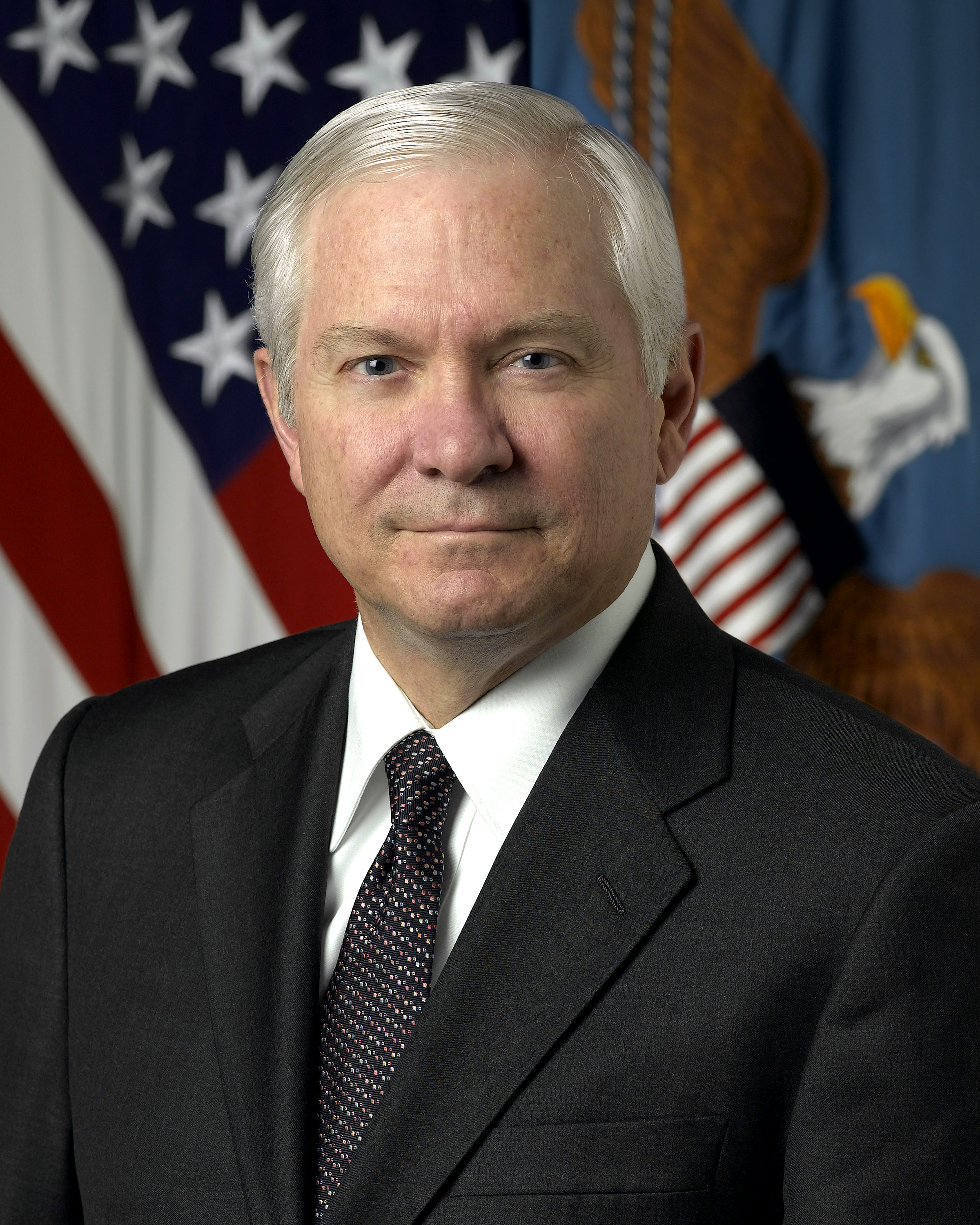
- Official portrait, 2006

24th Chancellor of the College of William and Mary
- Incumbent
- Assumed office February 3, 2012
- President: W. Taylor Reveley III; Katherine Rowe
- Preceded by: Sandra Day O'Connor

36th National President of the Boy Scouts of America
- In office May 22, 2014 – May 26, 2016
- Preceded by: Wayne M. Perry
- Succeeded by: Randall L. Stephenson

22nd United States Secretary of Defense
- In office December 18, 2006 – June 30, 2011
- President: George W. Bush; Barack Obama
- Deputy: Gordon R. England; William J. Lynn III
- Preceded by: Donald Rumsfeld
- Succeeded by: Leon Panetta

22nd President of Texas A&M University
- In office August 1, 2002 – December 16, 2006
- Preceded by: Ray M. Bowen
- Succeeded by: Ed Davis (acting)

15th Director of Central Intelligence
- In office November 6, 1991 – January 20, 1993
- President: George H. W. Bush
- Deputy: Richard James Kerr; William O. Studeman
- Preceded by: William H. Webster
- Succeeded by: R. James Woolsey Jr.
- In office December 18, 1986 – May 26, 1987; Acting
- President: Ronald Reagan
- Preceded by: William J. Casey
- Succeeded by: William H. Webster

17th United States Deputy National Security Advisor
- In office March 20, 1989 – November 6, 1991
- President: George H. W. Bush
- Preceded by: John Negroponte
- Succeeded by: Jonathan Howe

16th Deputy Director of Central Intelligence
- In office April 18, 1986 – March 20, 1989
- President: Ronald Reagan; George H. W. Bush
- Preceded by: John N. McMahon
- Succeeded by: Richard James Kerr

Personal details
- Born: Robert Michael Gates; September 25, 1943 (age 83) Wichita, Kansas, U.S.
- Party: Republican
- Spouse: Becky Wilkie (m. 1967)
- Children: 2
- Education: College of William and Mary (BA); Indiana University, Bloomington (MA); Georgetown University (PhD)

Military service
- Allegiance: United States
- Branch/service: United States Air Force
- Years of service: 1967–1969
- Rank: First Lieutenant
- Gates's voice Gates announcing personnel changes amid William Fallon's resignation as commander of USCENTCOM; Recorded April 23, 2008

Robert Michael Gates (born September 25, 1943) is an American intelligence analyst who served as the 22nd United States secretary of defense from 2006 to 2011 and as the 15th director of central intelligence from 1991 to 1993 as a member of the Republican Party. He has been the 24th chancellor of the College of William and Mary since 2012.

Gates began his career serving as an officer in the United States Air Force but was quickly recruited by the Central Intelligence Agency (CIA). Gates served for twenty-six years in the CIA and at the National Security Council, and was director of central intelligence under President George H. W. Bush. After leaving the CIA, Gates became president of Texas A&M University and was a member of several corporate boards. Gates served as a member of the Iraq Study Group, the bipartisan commission co-chaired by James A. Baker III and Lee H. Hamilton that studied the lessons of the Iraq War.

Gates was nominated by President George W. Bush as secretary of defense in 2006, replacing Donald Rumsfeld. He was confirmed with bipartisan support. He continued to serve as secretary of defense under President Barack Obama and retired in 2011. In 2007, Time named Gates one of the year's most influential people, and in 2008 he was named one of America's Best Leaders by U.S. News & World Report. Gates was presented the Presidential Medal of Freedom, the nation's highest civilian award, by President Obama during his retirement ceremony.

Since leaving the Obama administration, Gates was elected president of the Boy Scouts of America, served as chancellor of the College of William & Mary, and served as a member on several corporate boards. In 2012, Gates was elected as a fellow of the National Academy of Public Administration.

== Early life and education ==
Gates was born in Wichita, Kansas, the son of Isabel V. (née Goss) and Melville A. "Mel" Gates. Gates attained the rank of Eagle Scout in the Boy Scouts of America (BSA) and received the Distinguished Eagle Scout Award and Silver Buffalo Award from the BSA as an adult. He graduated from Wichita High School East in 1961.

Gates then received a scholarship to attend the College of William & Mary, graduating in 1965 with a B.A. in history. At William & Mary, Gates was an active member and president of the Alpha Phi Omega (national service fraternity) chapter and the Young Republicans; he was also the business manager for the William and Mary Review, a literary and art magazine. At his William & Mary graduation ceremony, Gates received the Algernon Sydney Sullivan Award naming him the graduate who "has made the greatest contribution to his fellow man".

Gates then received a Master of Arts in the history of Eastern Europe and the south Slavs from Indiana University Bloomington in 1966. He completed his PhD in Russian and Soviet history at Georgetown University in 1974 under Joseph Schiebel, who, according to Gates, had been heavily influenced by Karl Wittfogel's studies on "Soviet communism and its resemblance to oriental despotism and the Asiatic mode of production, [and] the role of government in controlling all of society". The title of Gates's Georgetown doctoral dissertation is Soviet Sinology: An Untapped Source for Kremlin Views and Disputes Relating to Contemporary Events in China and it is available from University Microfilms International as document number 7421652.

He married Rebecca "Becky" Gates (née Wilkie) on January 7, 1967, and they have two children.

== Intelligence career ==
=== Junior positions ===
While at Indiana University, Gates was recruited by the Central Intelligence Agency and joined in 1966. On January 4, 1967, he was commissioned as a Second Lieutenant in the United States Air Force after attending Officer Training School under CIA sponsorship. From 1967 to 1969, he was assigned to the Strategic Air Command as an intelligence officer, which included a year at Whiteman Air Force Base in Missouri, where he served with the 351st Strategic Missile Wing and delivered intelligence briefings to intercontinental ballistic missile crews. After fulfilling his military obligation, he rejoined the CIA as an intelligence analyst. He wrote his doctoral thesis while serving as a professional intelligence officer.

Gates left the CIA in 1974 to serve on the staff of the National Security Council. He returned to the CIA in late 1979, serving briefly as the director of the Strategic Evaluation Center, Office of Strategic Research. He was named the director of the DCI/DDCI Executive Staff in 1981, deputy director for intelligence in 1982, and deputy director of central intelligence from April 18, 1986, to March 20, 1989.

=== Deputy National Security Advisor ===
Under President George H. W. Bush, Gates was Deputy Assistant to the President for National Security Affairs from March until August 1989, and was Assistant to the President and Deputy National Security Adviser under Brent Scowcroft from August 1989 until November 1991.

Gates was nominated to become the director of central intelligence (head of the CIA) in early 1987. He withdrew his name after it became clear the Senate would reject the nomination due to controversy about his role in the Iran-Contra Affair.

=== Director of Central Intelligence ===
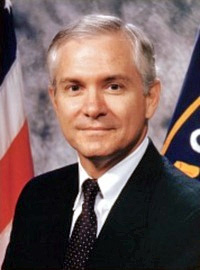
Gates while Director of Central Intelligence

Gates was nominated, for the second time, for the position of Director of Central Intelligence by Bush on May 14, 1991, confirmed by the Senate on November 5, and sworn in on November 6.

During a Senate committee hearing on his nomination, former division chief Melvin Goodman testified that the agency was the most corrupt and slanted during the tenure of William Casey with Gates serving as deputy. According to Goodman, Gates was part of an agency leadership that proliferated false information and ignored 'reality'. National Intelligence Council chairman Harold P. Ford testified that during his tenure, Gates had transgressed professional boundaries.

Deputy directors during his tenure were Richard J. Kerr (from November 6, 1991, until March 2, 1992) and Adm. William O. Studeman (from April 9, 1992, through the remainder of Gates's tenure). He served until 1993. It is notable that the reluctance of the Bush administration to involve itself in the breakup of Yugoslavia was due in no small part to three advisors who had deep exposure to the region: Scowcroft, Lawrence Eagleburger and himself: "We saw the historical roots of this conflict and the near nonexistent potential for solving it, for us fixing it."

=== Level of involvement in the Iran–Contra scandal ===
Because of his senior status in the CIA, Gates was close to many figures who played significant roles in the Iran–Contra Affair and was in a position to have known of their activities. In 1984, as deputy director of CIA, Gates advocated that the U.S. initiate a bombing campaign against Nicaragua and that the U.S. do everything in its power short of direct military invasion of the country to remove the Sandinista government.

Gates was an early subject of Independent Counsel's investigation, but the investigation of Gates intensified in the spring of 1991 as part of a larger inquiry into the Iran–Contra activities of CIA officials. This investigation received an additional impetus in May 1991, when President George H. W. Bush nominated Gates to be Director of Central Intelligence (DCI). The chairman and vice chairman of the United States Senate Select Committee on Intelligence (SSCI) requested, in a letter to the independent counsel on May 15, 1991, any information that would "significantly bear on the fitness" of Gates for the CIA post.

Gates consistently testified that he first heard on October 1, 1986, from Charles E. Allen, the national intelligence officer who was closest to the Iran initiative, that proceeds from the Iran arms sales may have been diverted to support the Contras. Other evidence proves, however, that Gates received a report on the diversion during the summer of 1986 from DDI Richard Kerr. The issue was whether the Independent Counsel could prove beyond a reasonable doubt that Gates was deliberately not telling the truth when he later claimed not to have remembered any reference to the diversion before meeting with Allen in October.

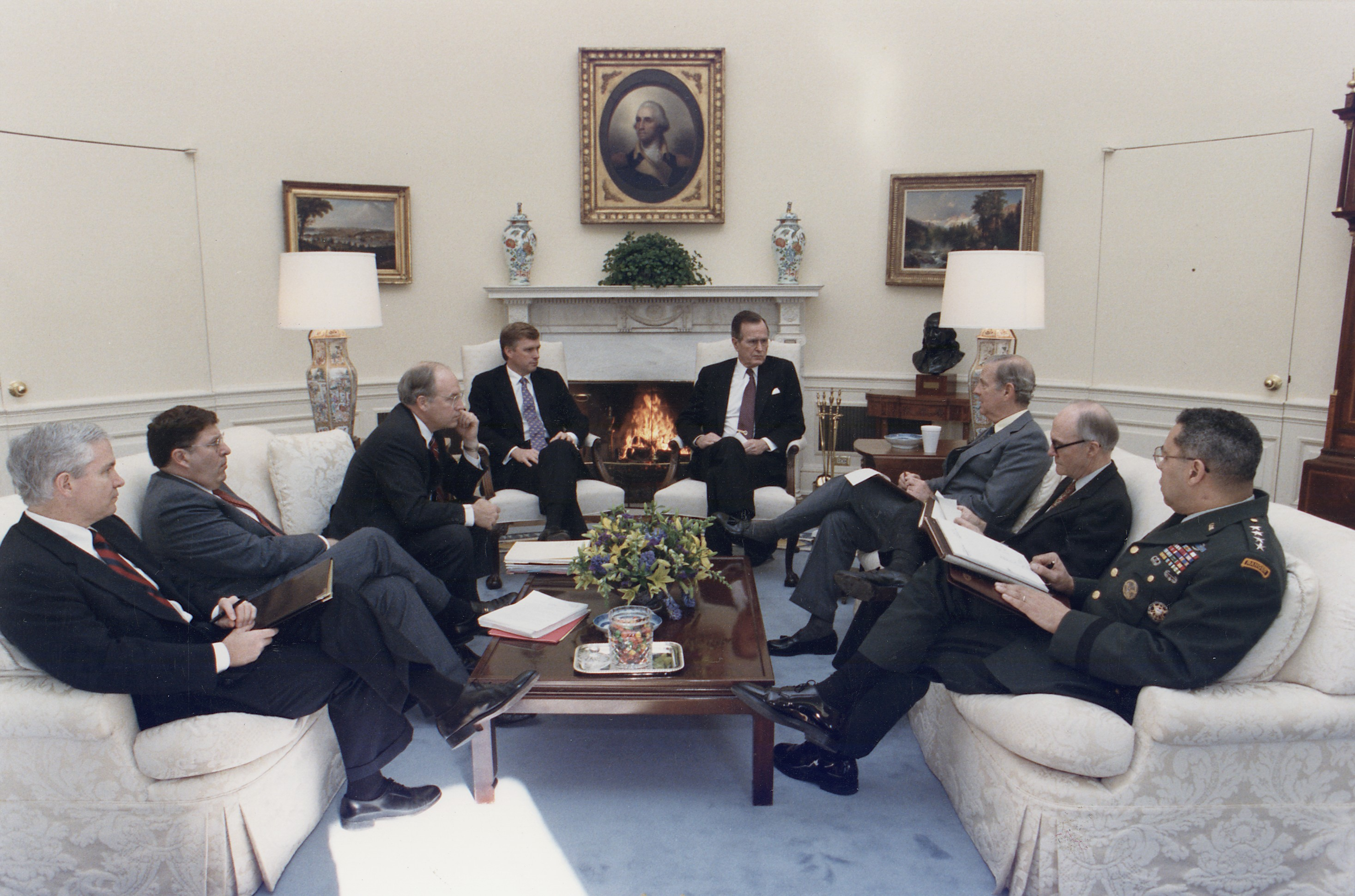
President George H. W. Bush meets with Robert Gates, General Colin Powell, Secretary Dick Cheney and others about the situation in the Persian Gulf and Operation Desert Shield, January 15, 1991.

Grand jury secrecy rules hampered Independent Counsel's response. Nevertheless, in order to answer questions about Gates's prior testimony, Independent Counsel accelerated his investigation of Gates in the summer of 1991. This investigation was substantially completed by September 3, 1991, at which time Independent Counsel determined that Gates's Iran–Contra activities and testimony did not warrant prosecution.

Independent Counsel made this decision subject to developments that could have warranted reopening his inquiry, including testimony by Clair E. George, the CIA's former deputy director for operations. At the time Independent Counsel reached this decision, the possibility remained that George could have provided information warranting reconsideration of Gates's status in the investigation. George refused to cooperate with Independent Counsel and was indicted on September 19, 1991. George subpoenaed Gates to testify as a defense witness at George's first trial in the summer of 1994, but Gates was never called.

The final report of the Independent Counsel for Iran–Contra Scandal, issued on August 4, 1993, said that Gates "was close to many figures who played significant roles in the Iran/contra affair and was in a position to have known of their activities. The evidence developed by Independent Counsel did not warrant indictment ..."

== Career after leaving the CIA ==
=== 1993–1999 ===
After retiring from the CIA in 1993, Gates worked as an academic and lecturer. He evaluated student theses for the International Studies Program of the University of Washington. He lectured at Harvard, Yale, Johns Hopkins, Vanderbilt, Georgetown, Indiana, Louisiana State, Oklahoma, and the College of William & Mary. Gates served as a member of the Board of Visitors of the University of Oklahoma International Programs Center and a trustee of the endowment fund for the College of William & Mary, his alma mater, which in 1998 conferred upon him honorary degree of Doctor of Humane Letters. In 1996, Gates's autobiography, From the Shadows: The Ultimate Insider's Story of Five Presidents and How They Won the Cold War, was published. Gates has also written numerous articles on government and foreign policy and has been a frequent contributor to the op-ed page of The New York Times.

=== Texas A&M ===
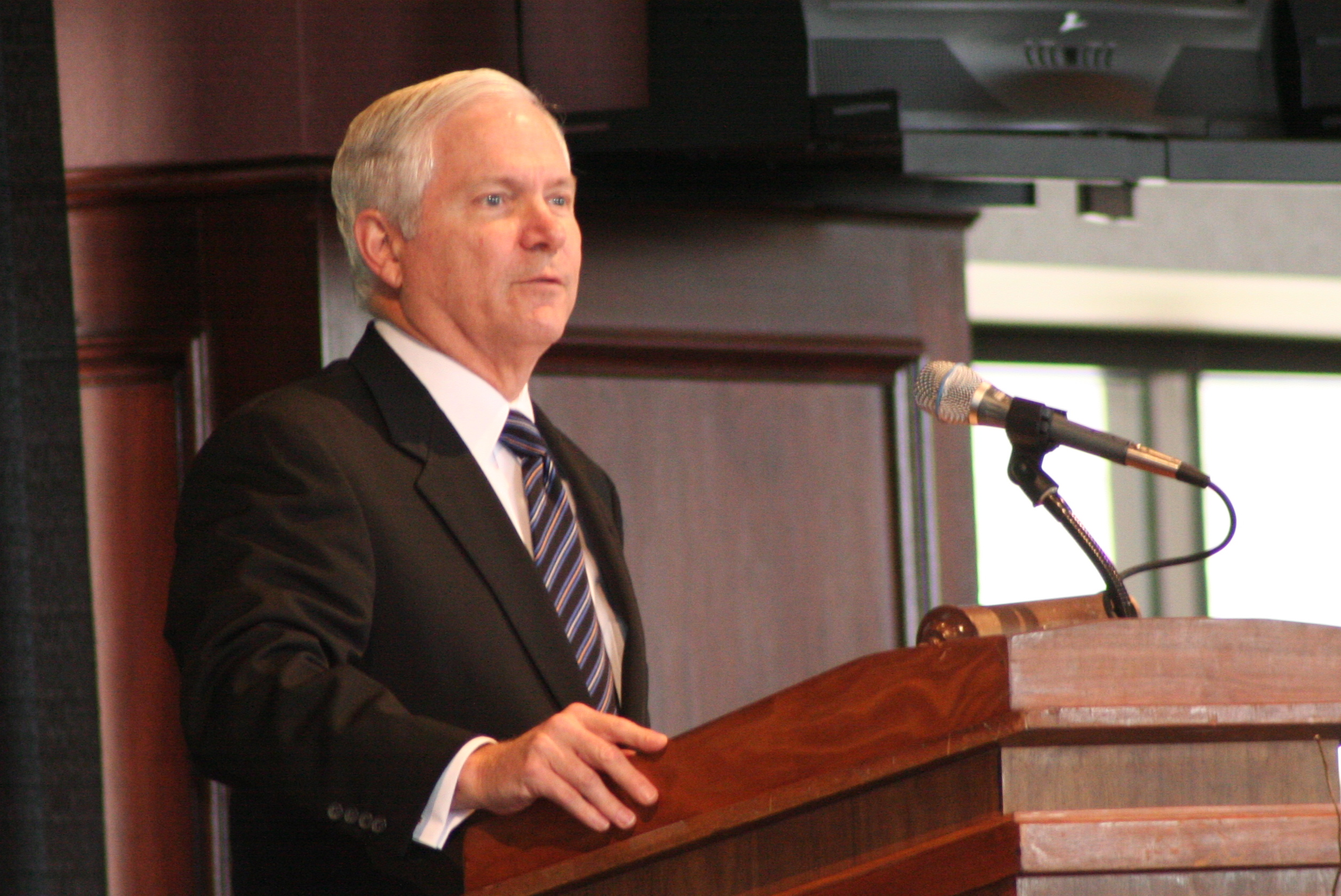
Gates at Texas A&M University

Gates was the interim dean of the Bush School of Government and Public Service at Texas A&M University from 1999 to 2001. On August 1, 2002, he became the 22nd president of Texas A&M. As the university president, Gates made progress in four key areas of the university's "Vision 2020" plan, a plan to become one of the top 10 public universities by 2020. The four key areas include improving student diversity, increasing the size of the faculty, building new academic facilities, and enriching the undergraduate and graduate education experience.

During his tenure, Gates encouraged the addition of 440 new faculty positions and a $300 million campus construction program, and saw increases in minority enrollment. On February 2, 2007, Gates was conferred the title of president emeritus by unanimous vote of the Texas A&M University System Board of Regents. Gates and his wife Becky received honorary doctoral degrees from Texas A&M on August 10, 2007.

Gates left the presidency of Texas A&M University on December 16, 2006, and was sworn in two days later as Secretary of Defense. He returned on April 21, 2009, as the speaker for the annual Aggie Muster ceremony. He is one of only 6 speakers not to be a graduate of Texas A&M University since Dwight D. Eisenhower spoke in 1946. In his affiliation with A&M, Gates has served on the National Security Higher Education Advisory Board.

=== Corporate boards ===
Gates has been a member of the board of trustees of Fidelity Investments, and on the board of directors of NACCO Industries, Inc., Brinker International, Inc., Parker Drilling Company, Science Applications International Corporation, and VoteHere, a technology company which sought to provide cryptography and computer software security for the electronic election industry. Following his nomination, a White House spokeswoman said that Gates planned to sell all the stock he owns in individual companies and sever all ties with them if confirmed by the Senate.

=== Public service ===
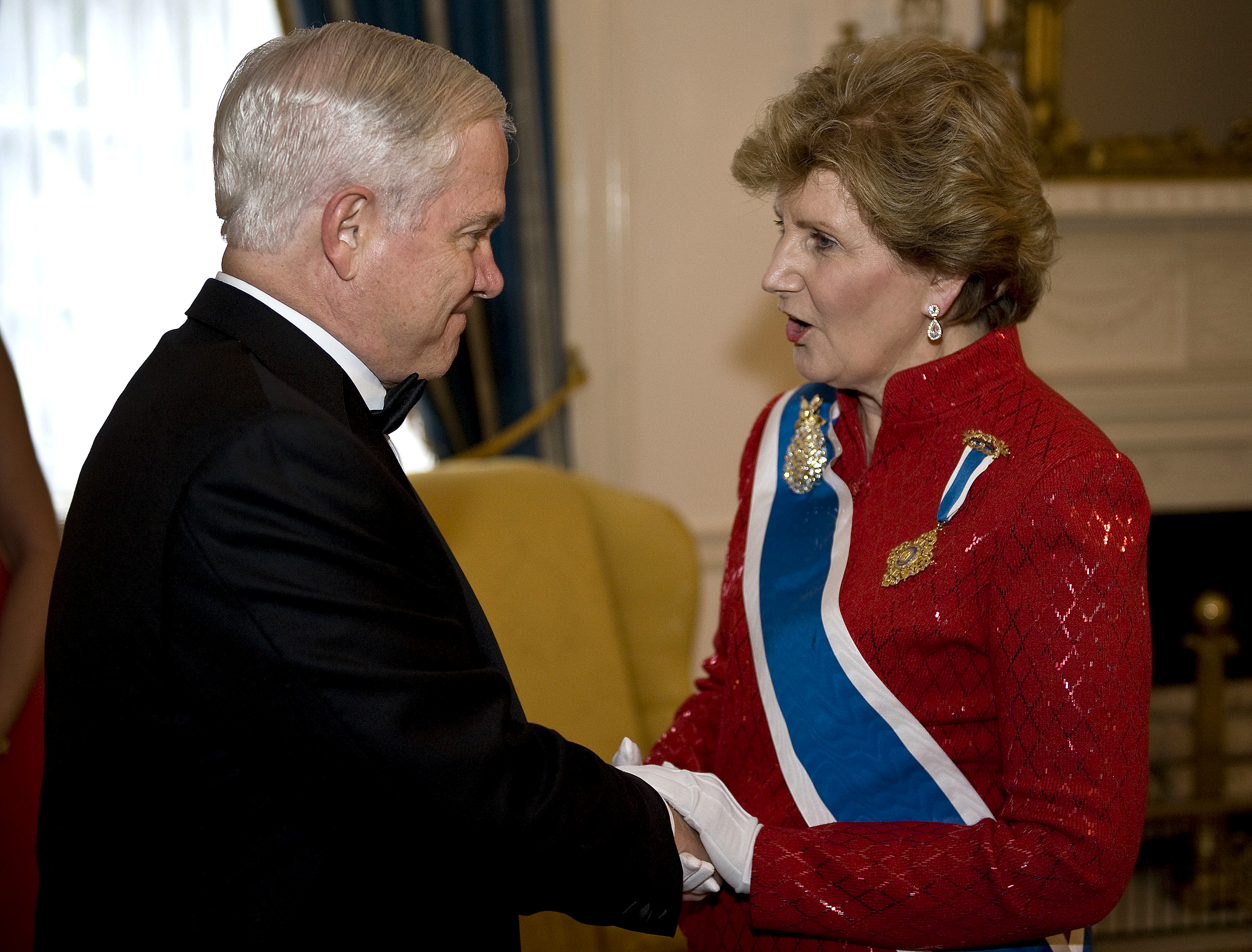
Gates with NSDAR president general Linda Gist Calvin at DAR Constitution Hall in 2008

Gates is a former president of the National Eagle Scout Association.

In January 2004, Gates co-chaired a Council on Foreign Relations task force on U.S. relations towards Iran. Among the task force's primary recommendation was to directly engage Iran on a diplomatic level regarding Iranian nuclear technology. Key points included a negotiated position that would allow Iran to develop its nuclear program in exchange for a commitment from Iran to use the program only for peaceful means.

At the time of his nomination by President George W. Bush to the position of Secretary of Defense, Gates was also a member of the Iraq Study Group, also called the Baker Commission, which was expected to issue its report in November 2006, following the mid-term election on November 7. He was replaced by former Secretary of State Lawrence Eagleburger.

=== Declined appointment as Director of National Intelligence ===
In February 2005, Gates wrote in a message posted on his school's website that "there seems to be a growing number of rumors in the media and around campus that I am leaving Texas A&M to become the new director of national intelligence in Washington, D.C." The message said that "To put the rumors to rest, I was indeed asked to take the position, wrestled with perhaps the most difficult—and close—decision of my life, and last week declined the position."

Gates committed to remain as president of Texas A&M University and President George W. Bush offered the position of United States Director of National Intelligence (DNI) to John Negroponte, who accepted.

Gates said in a 2005 discussion with the university's Academy for Future International Leaders that he had tentatively decided to accept the DNI position out of a sense of duty and had written an email that would be sent to students during the press conference to announce his decision, explaining that he was leaving to serve the U.S. once again. Gates, however, took the weekend to consider what his final decision should be, and ultimately decided that he was unwilling to return to Washington, D.C., in any capacity, simply because he "had nothing to look forward to in D.C. and plenty to look forward to at A&M".

== Secretary of Defense ==
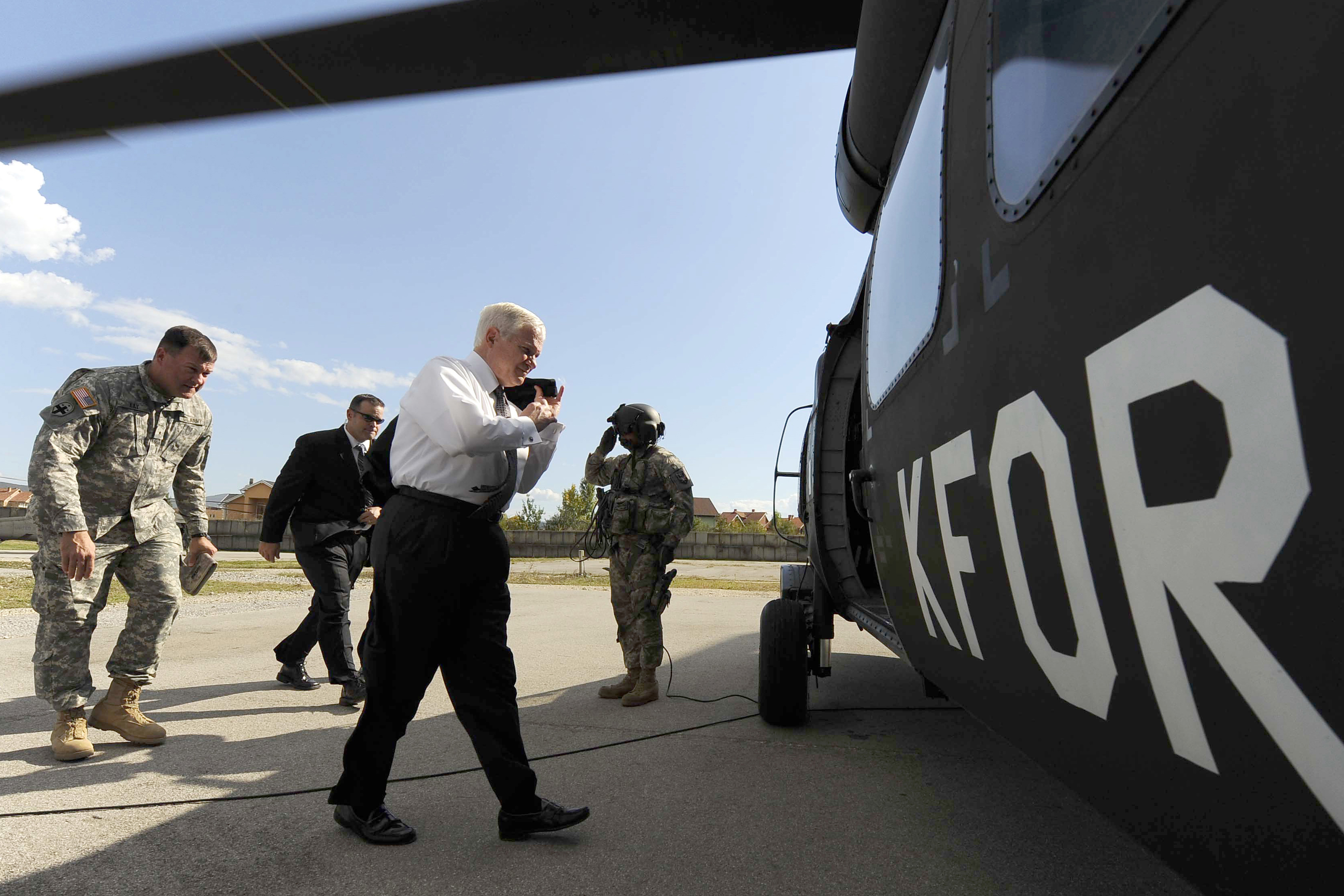
Gates boards a UH-60 Blackhawk at Camp Monteith, Kosovo

=== Bush administration ===
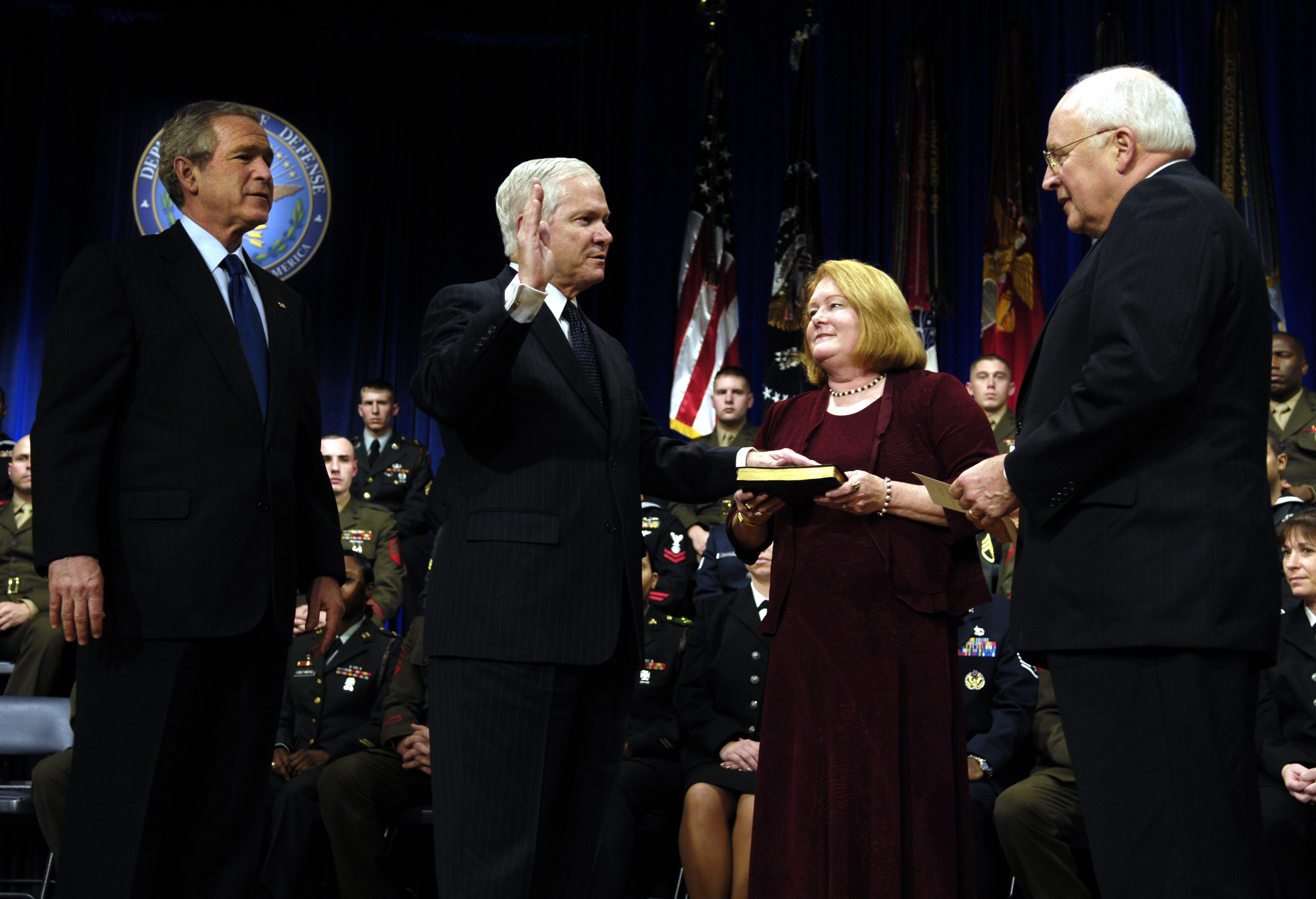
Gates being sworn in as Defense Secretary on December 18, 2006

On November 8, 2006, after the 2006 midterm election, President George W. Bush announced his intent to nominate Gates to succeed the resigning Donald Rumsfeld as U.S. Secretary of Defense.

Gates was unanimously confirmed by the United States Senate Armed Services Committee on December 5, 2006. During his confirmation hearing on December 5, 2006, Gates replied to a question that, in his opinion, the United States was neither winning nor losing the war in Iraq. The next day, Gates was confirmed by the full Senate by a margin of 95–2, with Republican Senators Rick Santorum and Jim Bunning casting the two dissenting votes and senators Elizabeth Dole, Evan Bayh, and Joe Biden not voting. On December 18, 2006, Gates was sworn in as Secretary of Defense by White House Chief of Staff Josh Bolten at a private White House ceremony and then by Vice President Dick Cheney at the Pentagon.

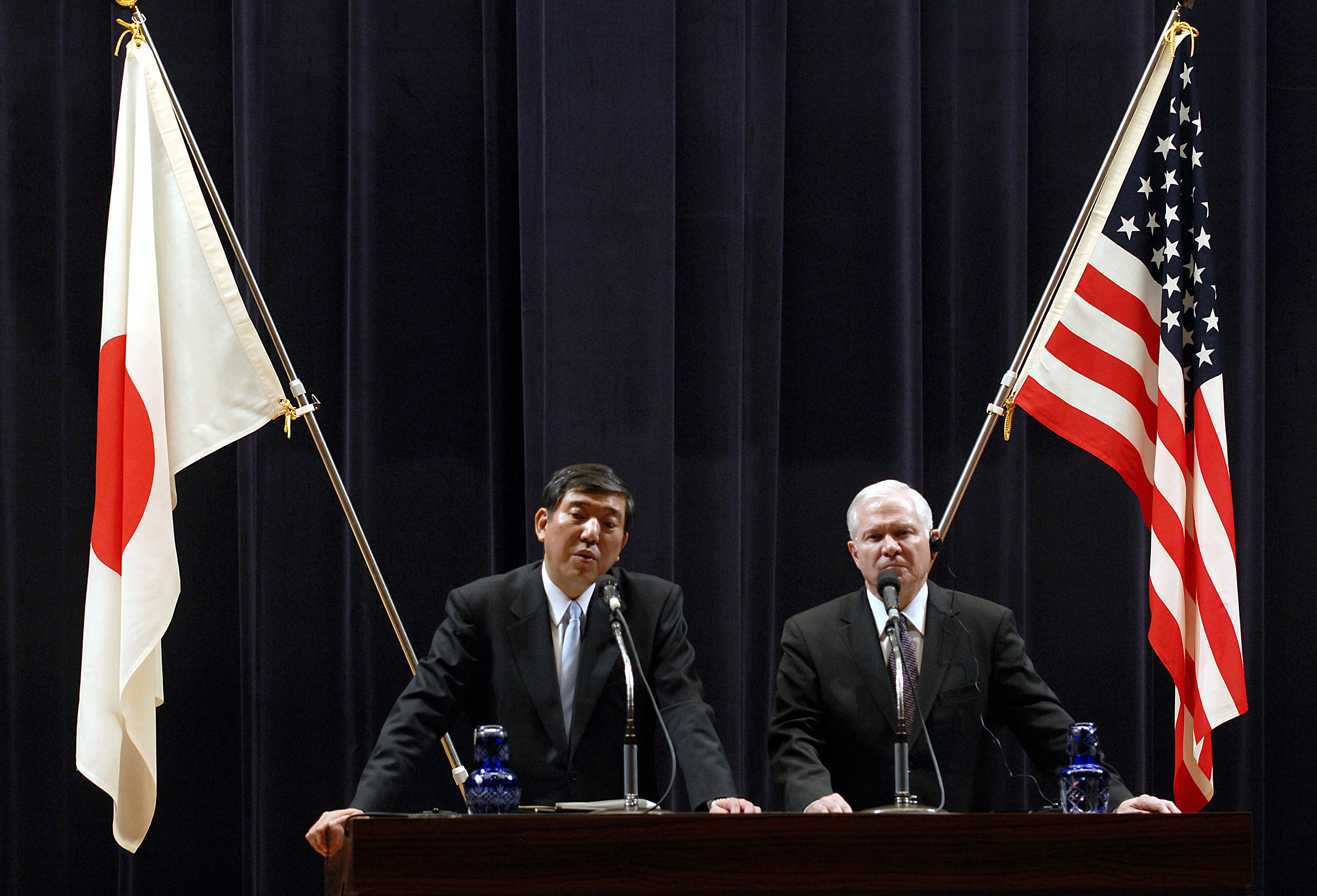
Gates with Japanese Defense Minister Shigeru Ishiba in Japan, November 2007

Under the Bush administration, Gates directed the war in Iraq's troop surge, a marked change in tactics from his predecessor. With violence on the decline in Iraq, in 2008, Gates also began the troop withdrawal of Iraq, a policy continued into the Obama administration.

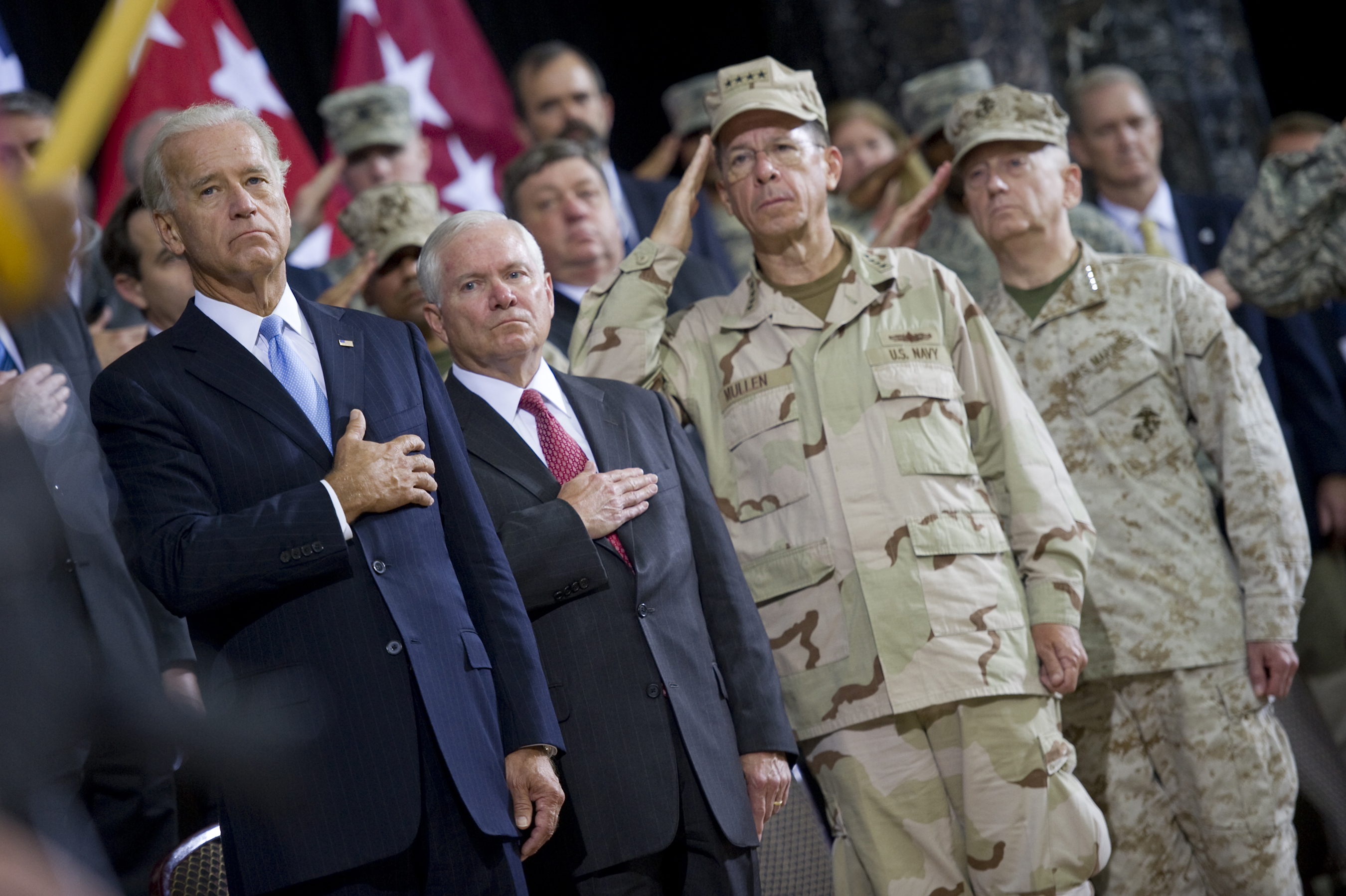
Gates, Vice President Joe Biden, Admiral Mike Mullen and General Jim Mattis in Baghdad, Iraq

==== Walter Reed Medical Center scandal ====
Several months after his appointment, The Washington Post published a series of articles beginning February 18, 2007, that brought to the spotlight the Walter Reed Army Medical Center neglect scandal. As a result of the fallout from the incident, Gates announced the removal of Secretary of the Army Francis J. Harvey, and later, he approved the removal of Army Surgeon General Kevin C. Kiley.

==== Controversy over Joint Chiefs ====
On June 8, 2007, Gates announced that he would not recommend the renomination of Peter Pace, the Chairman of Joint Chiefs of Staff, due to anticipated difficulties with the confirmation process. Instead, Gates recommended Mike Mullen, the Chief of Naval Operations at the time, to fill the position. Gates stated: "I am no stranger to contentious confirmations, and I do not shrink from them. However, I have decided that at this moment in our history, the nation, our men and women in uniform, and General Pace himself would not be well-served by a divisive ordeal in selecting the next chairman of the Joint Chiefs of Staff." Gates referred to Pace as a friend and praised his service as a Marine.

==== Misshipments of nuclear weapons ====
On June 5, 2008, in response to the findings on Air Force misshipments of nuclear weapons and nuclear weapons components, Gates announced the resignations of Secretary of the Air Force Michael Wynne and Air Force Chief of Staff Michael Moseley. Gates would later write that the USAF was "one of my biggest headaches" during his time in the office.

=== Obama administration ===
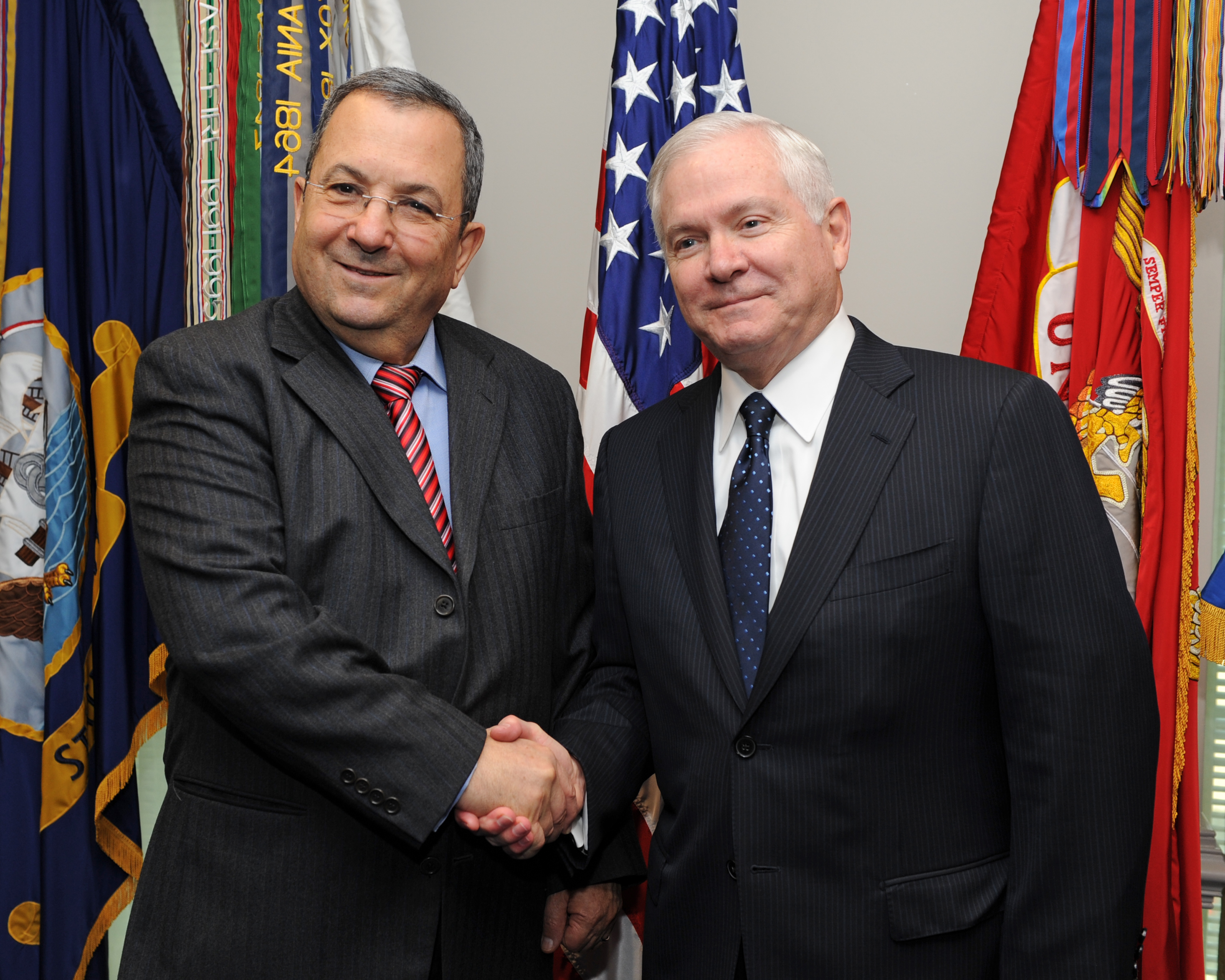
Gates with Israeli Minister of Defense Ehud Barak at the Pentagon in 2009

On December 1, 2008, President-elect Obama announced that Robert Gates would remain in his position as Secretary of Defense during his administration, reportedly for at least the first year of Obama's presidency. Gates was the fourteenth Cabinet member in history to serve under two presidents of different parties, and the first to do so as Secretary of Defense. One of the first priorities under President Barack Obama's administration for Gates was a review of U.S. policy and strategy in Afghanistan.

Gates, sixth in the presidential line of succession, was selected as designated survivor during Obama's inauguration. On March 1, 2009, he told David Gregory on Meet the Press that he would not commit to how long he would serve as Secretary of Defense but implied that he would not serve the entire first term.

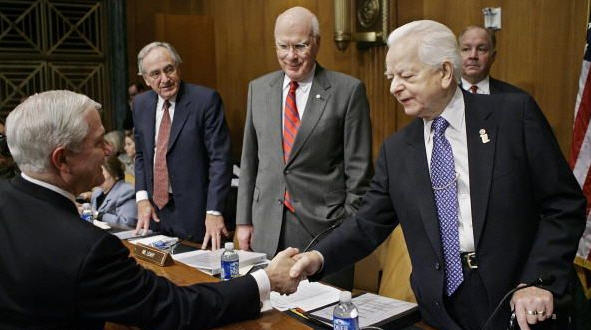
Former Committee chairman Robert Byrd (D-West Virginia, far right) shakes hands with Secretary of Defense Robert Gates, while Sens. Patrick Leahy (D-Vermont, center right) and Tom Harkin (D-Iowa) look on. The hearing was held to discuss further funding for the War in Iraq.

While Gates continued the troop withdrawals in Iraq, which already had begun in the Bush administration, he also implemented a rapid, limited surge of troops in Afghanistan in 2009. Robert Gates removed General David D. McKiernan from command in Afghanistan on May 6, 2009 and replaced him with General Stanley A. McChrystal. The Washington Post called it "a rare decision to remove a wartime commander". The Washington Post described the replacement as one of several replacements of generals who represented the "traditional Army" with generals "who have pressed for the use of counter-insurgency tactics".

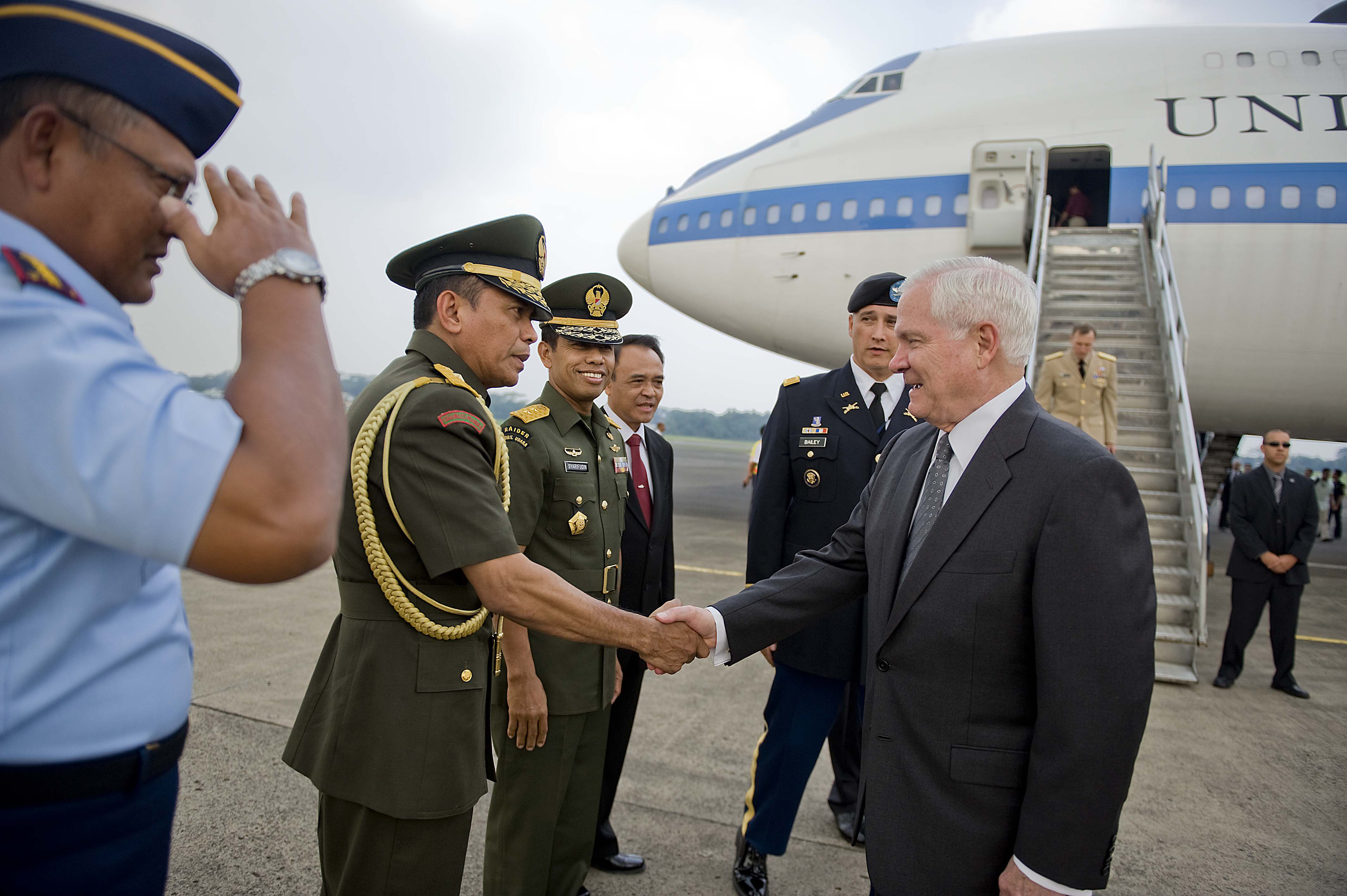
Gates is greeted by Indonesian military members after arriving in Jakarta, Indonesia on July 22, 2010

In December 2009, Gates visited Afghanistan following President Barack Obama's announcement of the deployment of 30,000 additional personnel against the Taliban insurgency.

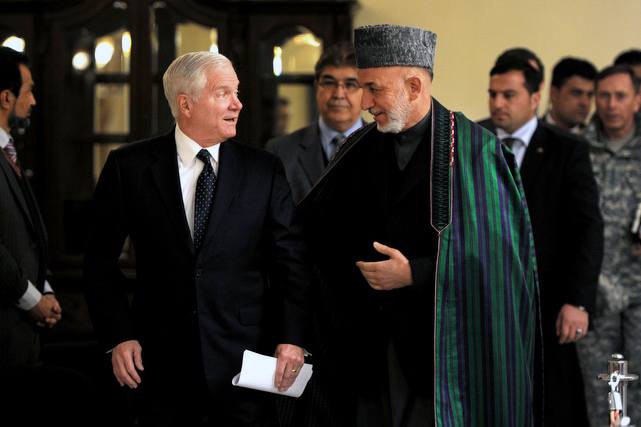
Gates with Afghan president Hamid Karzai in March 2011

Time magazine notes that Gates and U.S. Secretary of State Hillary Clinton have "forged a formidable partnership", speaking frequently, "comparing notes before they go to the White House", meeting with each other weekly and having lunch once a month at either the Pentagon or the State Department.

In a March 2010 speech to a NATO conference in Washington, Secretary Gates said that "The demilitarization of Europe—where large swaths of the general public and political class are averse to military force and the risks that go with it—has gone from a blessing in the 20th century to an impediment to achieving real security and lasting peace in the 21st".

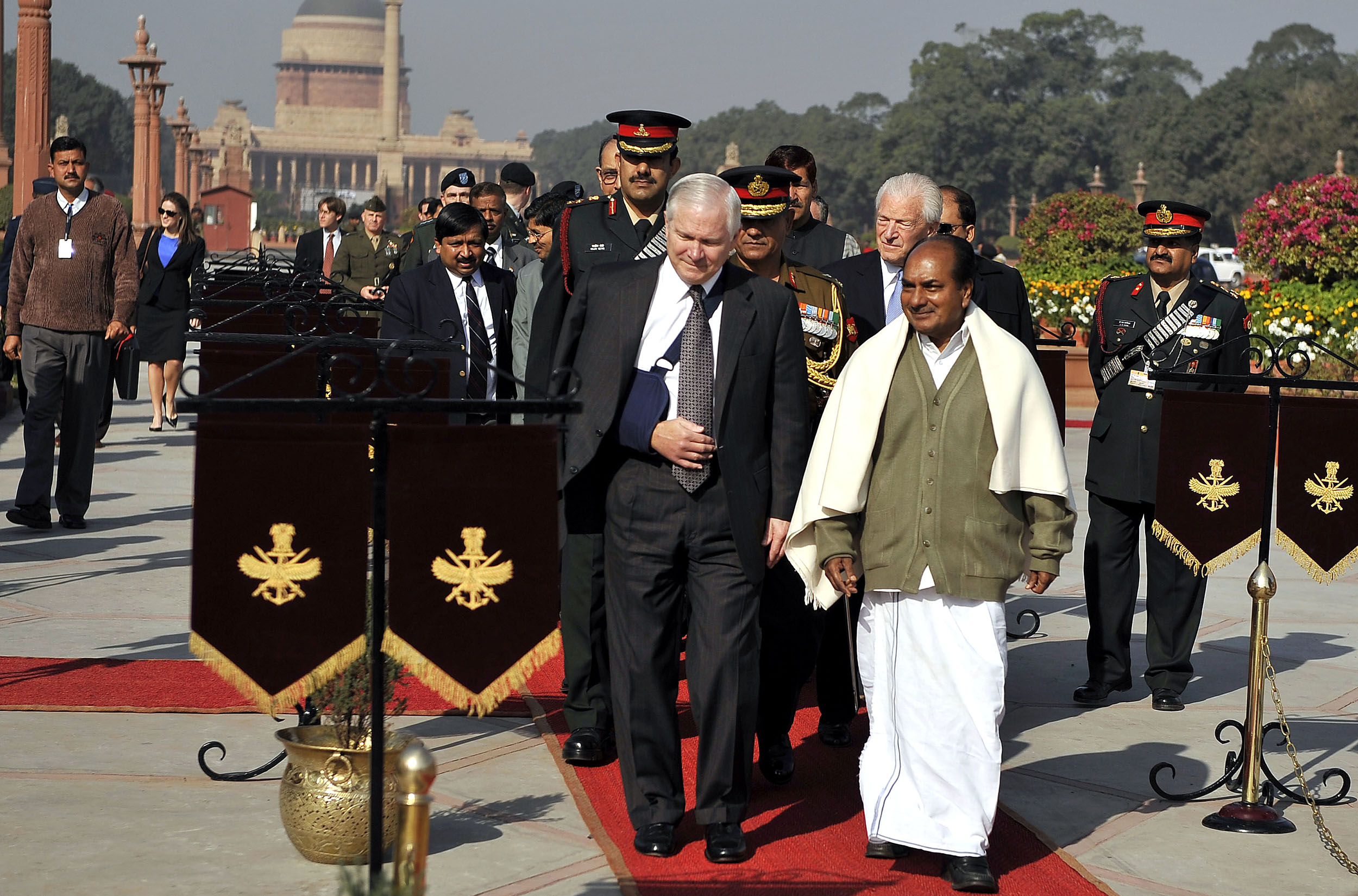
Defense Secretary Robert M. Gates walks with Indian Defense Minister A. K. Antony, at the Ministry of Defense in New Delhi, India, February 27, 2008. Gates also met with the Indian Prime Minister during his trip to the region.

In February 2010, Gates announced that the department would lift its ban on women serving on submarines. Gates also prepared the armed forces for the repeal of the don't ask, don't tell policy. Since the repeal in 2010, homosexuals are able to serve in the military openly. In service of that goal, he announced in late March 2010 the approval of new regulations that would make it more difficult to kick gays out of the military.

Gates called the guideline changes, which went into effect immediately, a matter of "common sense and common decency" that would be "an important improvement" allowing the Pentagon to apply current law in "a fairer and more appropriate" manner. The Pentagon's legal counsel, Jeh Johnson, said the new regulations are by no means a moratorium on the current law and stressed that cases would move forward under the new standards.

In August 2010, speaking to Foreign Policy magazine Secretary Gates said that he would remain as Secretary of Defense until 2011 and then retire. "I think that it would be a mistake to wait until January 2012," he said. "This is not the kind of job you want to fill in the spring of an election year."

In March 2011, Gates directed the role of the United States armed forces in the 2011 military intervention in Libya. While aboard a military aircraft on March 20, 2011, Gates told the press that "military forces are just one way to bring stability to Libya".

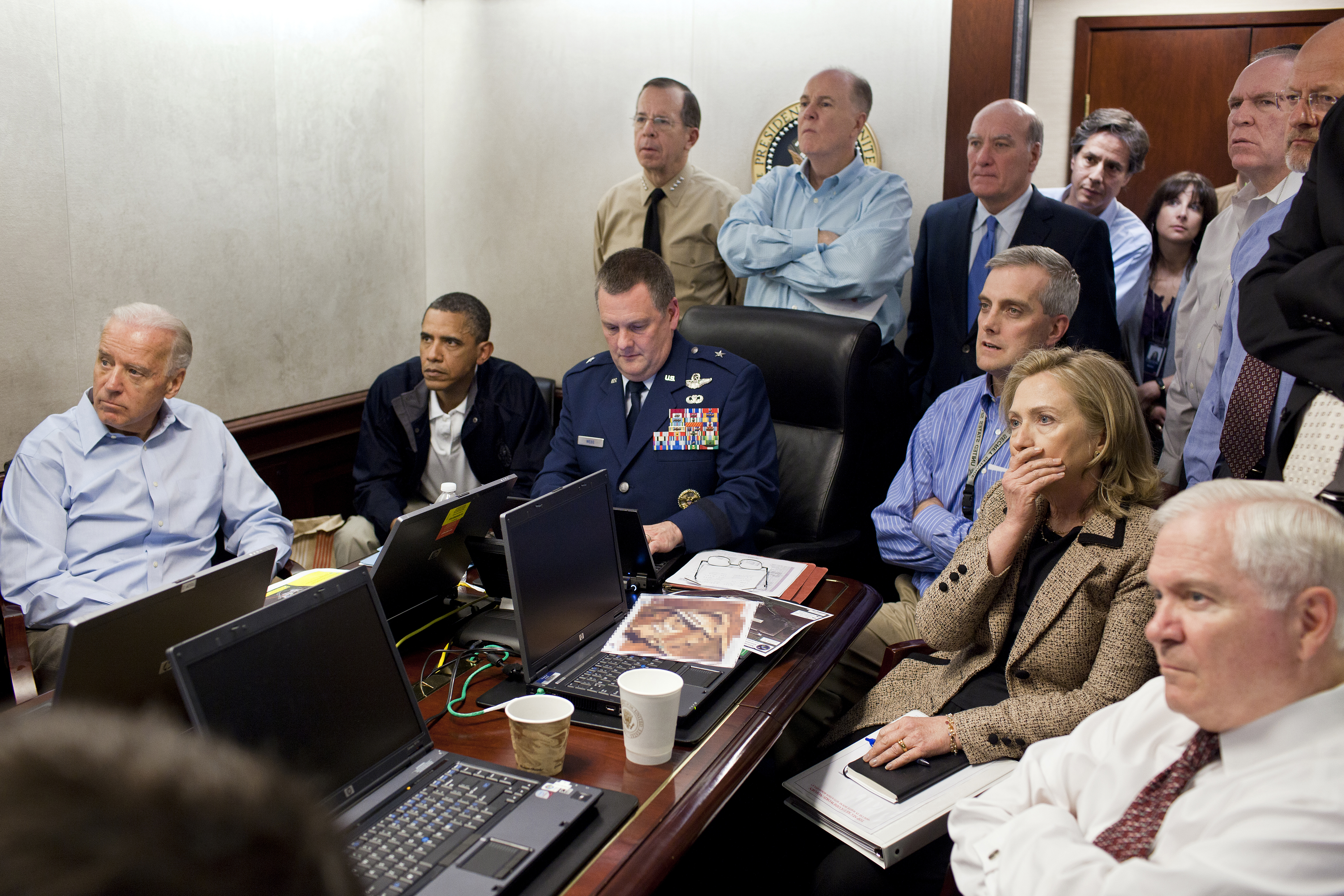
Gates sitting with Obama, Biden, and the U.S. national security team gathered in the Situation Room to monitor the progress of Operation Neptune Spear

Gates was photographed in the White House Situation Room photograph taken on May 1, 2011, by Pete Souza during the raid that killed Al-Qaeda terrorist organization leader Osama bin Laden.

Gates officially retired as Secretary of Defense on July 1, 2011, and was presented the Presidential Medal of Freedom, the nation's highest civilian award, by President Obama during his retirement ceremony. "He'll be remembered for making us aware of the danger of over-reliance on military intervention as an instrument of American foreign policy," said former senator David L. Boren.

==== Fiscal restraint ====
Gates's tenure with the Obama administration included a huge shift in military spending. In April 2009, Gates proposed a large shift in budget priorities in the U.S. Department of Defense 2010 budget. The budget cuts included many programs geared toward conventional warfare, such as the end of new orders of the F-22 Raptor and of further development of Future Combat Systems manned vehicles. These cuts were counterbalanced by increases in funding for programs like the special forces. Gates called this the "nation's first truly 21st century defense budget".

In late April 2010, he suggested the Navy cease funding development of a new multibillion-dollar ballistic missile submarine program on the grounds of cost and relevancy. He suggested the hundreds of billions of dollars would be better spent on a new generation of vessels tailored to the threats and tactics more likely to be faced, noting, "Mark my words, the Navy and Marine Corps must be willing to re-examine and question basic assumptions in light of evolving technologies, new threats and budget realities." In a speech made on May 8, 2010, Gates stated that he would make politically unpopular cuts to the Pentagon bureaucracy in his future budgets.

The attacks of Sept. 11, 2001, opened a gusher of defense spending that nearly doubled the base budget over the last decade ... Military spending on things large and small can and should expect closer, harsher scrutiny. The gusher has been turned off, and will stay off for a good period of time.

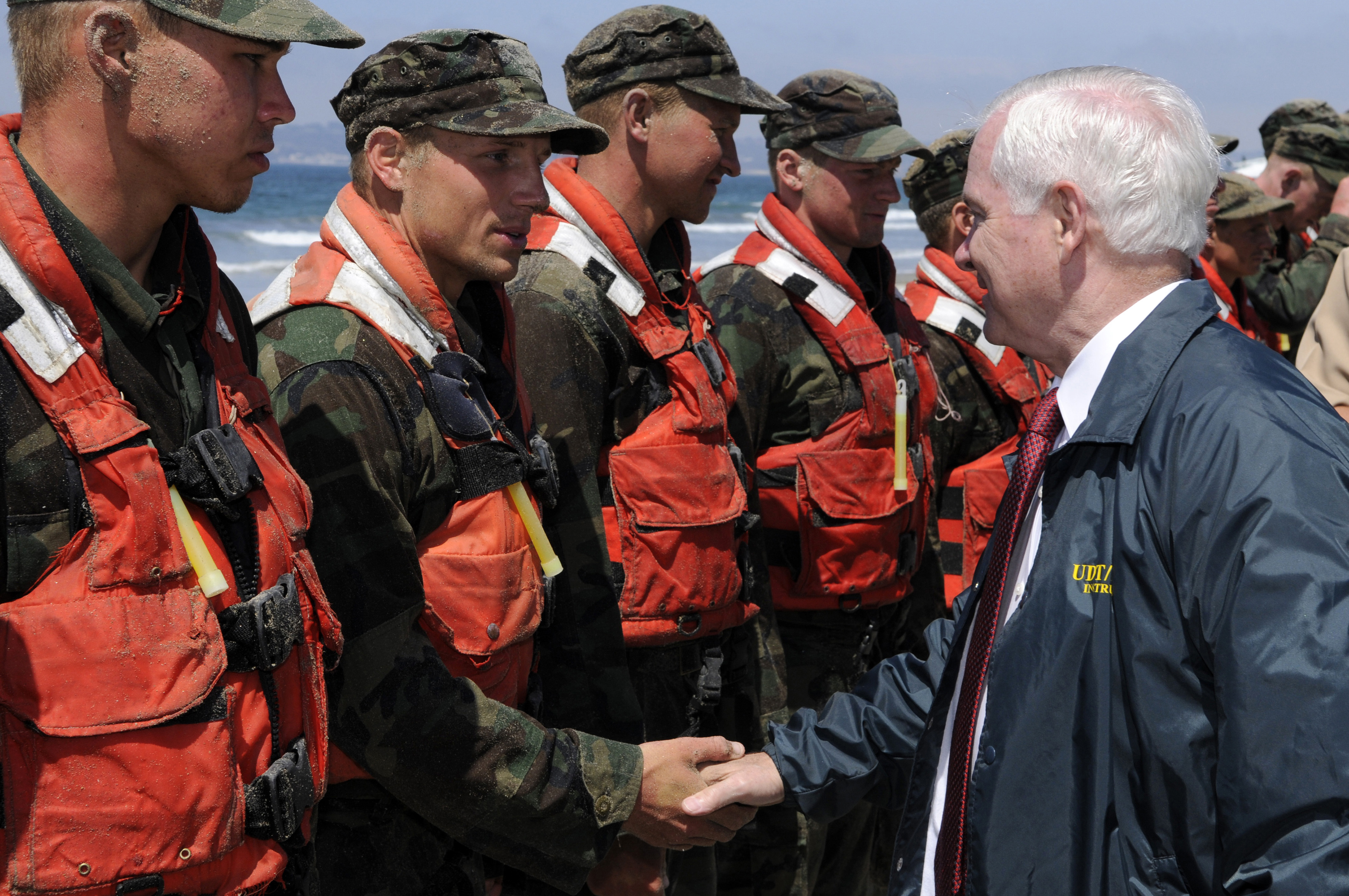
Gates speaks to Navy SEAL trainees, NAB Coronado, California, 2010

It was announced in August 2010 that Gates was trying to find $100 billion in Defense savings through to 2015, in order to instill a "culture of savings and restraint" in the military. Secretary Gates said that "It is important that we do not repeat the mistakes of the past, where tough economic times or the winding down of a military campaign leads to steep and unwise reductions in defense". Gates said "As a matter of principle and political reality, the Department of Defense cannot expect America's elected representatives to approve budget increases each year unless we are doing a good job, indeed everything possible, to make every dollar count". These cuts included the closing of the Joint Forces Command, the redundancy of fifty general and admirals, and the removal of 150 senior civilian positions.

==== NATO comments ====
On January 16, 2008, Gates was quoted in the Los Angeles Times as saying NATO forces in southern Afghanistan do not know how to properly combat a guerrilla insurgency and that could be contributing to rising violence in the country. The Netherlands and United Kingdom protested.

In a June 10, 2011, speech in Brussels, before NATO, Gates again stated that other NATO members must do more as the United States tackles its budget deficit. He said bluntly that

In the past, I've worried openly about NATO turning into a two-tiered alliance: Between members who specialize in "soft" humanitarian, development, peacekeeping and talking tasks, and those conducting the "hard" combat missions. Between those willing and able to pay the price and bear the burdens of alliance commitments, and those who enjoy the benefits of NATO membership—be they security guarantees or headquarters billets—but don't want to share the risks and the costs. This is no longer a hypothetical worry. We are there today. And it is unacceptable. The blunt reality is that there will be dwindling appetite and patience in the U.S. Congress—and in the American body politic writ large—to expend increasingly precious funds on behalf of nations that are apparently unwilling to devote the necessary resources or make the necessary changes to be serious and capable partners in their own defense. Nations apparently willing and eager for American taxpayers to assume the growing security burden left by reductions in European defense budgets. Indeed, if current trends in the decline of European defense capabilities are not halted and reversed, future U.S. political leaders—those for whom the Cold War was not the formative experience that it was for me—may not consider the return on America's investment in NATO worth the cost.

== College chancellor (2011–present) ==
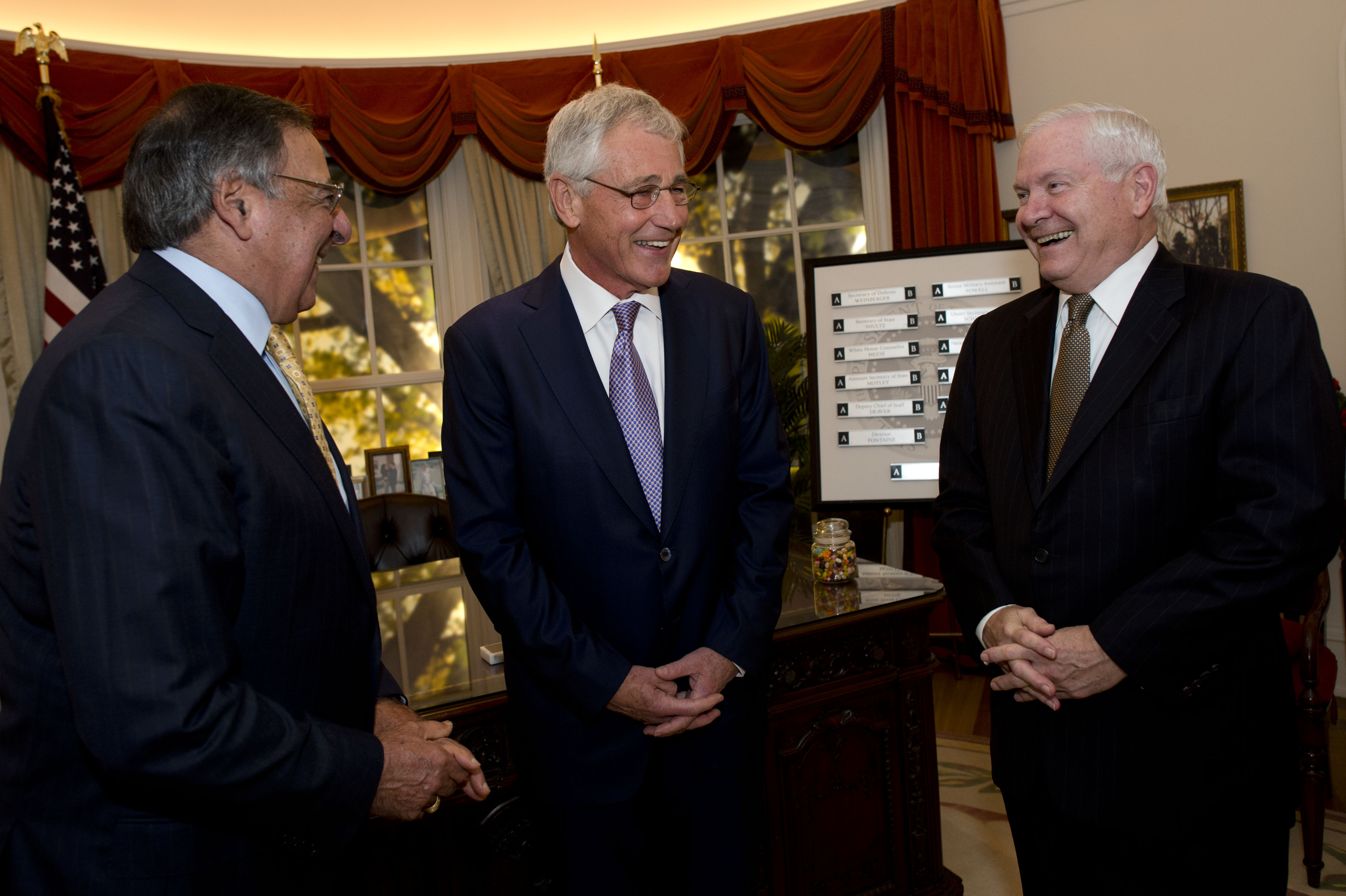
Secretary of Defense Chuck Hagel speaks with Gates and Leon Panetta, November 2013

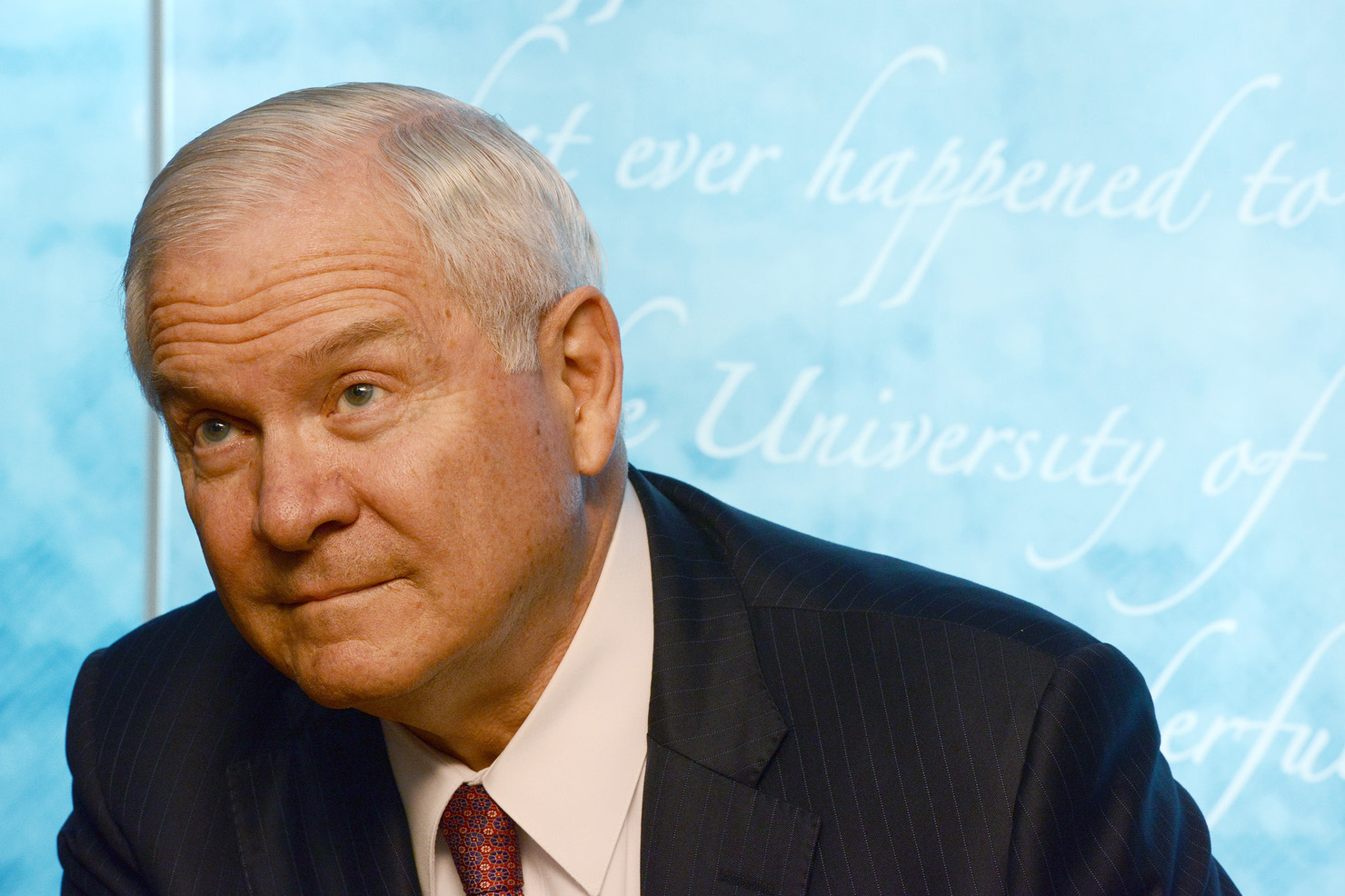
Gates at the LBJ Library in 2016

On September 6, 2011, it was announced that Gates had accepted the position of chancellor at the College of William & Mary, succeeding Sandra Day O'Connor for a seven-year term. He took the office of the chancellor on February 3, 2012.

In September 2018, Gates was re-appointed to serve a second seven-year term as chancellor at the College of William & Mary.

=== Extracurricular activities ===
Gates is a Principal, along with Condoleezza Rice, Stephen Hadley and Anja Manuel, in RiceHadleyGates LLC, a strategic consulting firm.

Gates also serves as an honorary director on the board of directors at the Atlantic Council.

On May 2, 2012, Starbucks Corporation announced that Gates had been elected to the Starbucks board of directors. He will serve on the board's nominating and corporate governance committee.

On October 30, 2013, the Boy Scouts of America announced that Gates had been elected to the National executive board, serving initially as the national president-elect. In May 2014, he began a two-year-long term as the BSA national president. Randall Stephenson, chairman and chief executive officer of AT&T Inc. served under Gates as the president-elect. Gates succeeded Wayne Perry as the national president. On May 21, 2015, Gates stated that the "status quo [ban on gay adult leaders] in [the BSA] movement's membership standards cannot be sustained" and that he would no longer seek to revoke the charters of scout units that accept gay adult leaders.

In the wake of the annexation of Crimea in March 2014, Gates wrote an op-ed piece on Vladimir Putin, Russian expansionism, the nascent sanctions regime, the US military budget, and the need for bold leadership.

Gates, along with former Secretary of State Condoleezza Rice and other Republican former foreign policy officials, recommended to incoming president Donald Trump that ExxonMobil CEO Rex Tillerson be considered for the Trump administration as Secretary of State.

Gates, along with all other living former secretaries of defense, ten in total, published a Washington Post op-ed piece 3 January 2021 telling President Trump not to involve the military in determining the outcome of the 2020 elections.

During the COVID-19 pandemic, Gates participated as a member of the National Advisory Council for the COVID Collaborative.

=== Memoirs ===
In his memoir, Duty: Memoirs of a Secretary at War, Gates alternately criticized and praised Obama's military leadership, writing, "I never doubted [his] support for the troops, only his support for their mission [in Afghanistan]", and "I was very proud to work for a president who had made one of the most courageous decisions I had ever witnessed in the White House" by authorizing the 2011 raid that killed Osama bin Laden. Of then Vice-President Joe Biden, Gates wrote "I think he has been wrong on nearly every major foreign policy and national security issue over the past four decades."

== Criticism ==
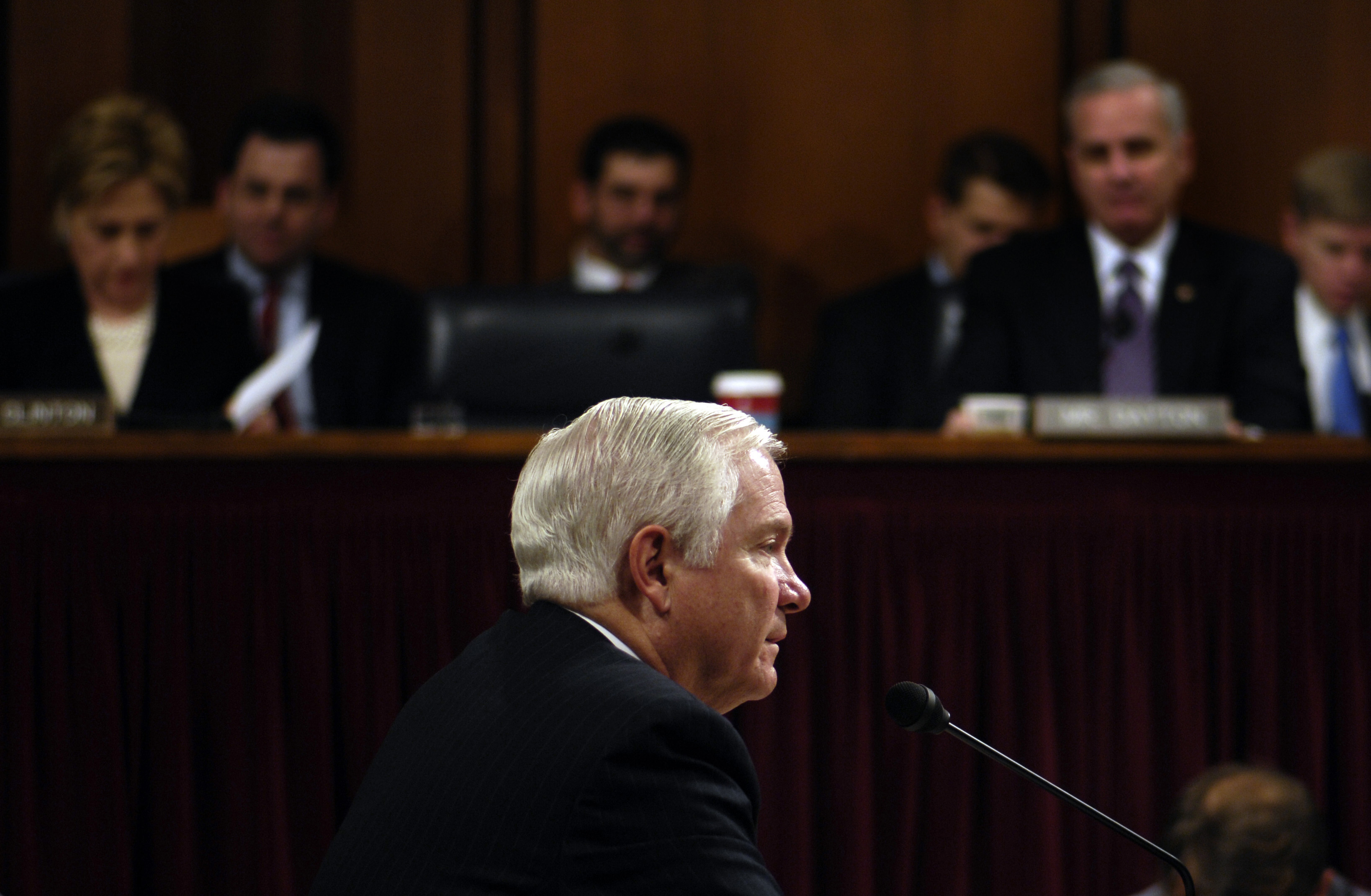
Gates responds to a question during the Senate Armed Services Committee hearing on December 5, 2006

As deputy director and director of America's leading intelligence agency for many years, Gates and his CIA staff have been faulted for failing to accurately gauge the decline and disintegration of the Soviet Union. More particularly, Gates has been criticized for allegedly concocting evidence to show that the Soviet Union was stronger than it actually was. George Shultz said that, while Secretary of State from 1982 to 1989, he felt the CIA under Gates was trying to "manipulate" him, that the agency was "a big powerful machine not under good control. I distrust what comes out of it." Shultz personally convinced Reagan that the U.S. should soften its stance towards the USSR after Gorbachev came to power in 1985; Shultz told Gates at the time that his CIA was "usually wrong" about the Soviet Union, having dismissed Gorbachev's policies as "just another Soviet attempt to deceive us."

In 1991, Stansfield Turner, former Director of Central Intelligence, described the "enormity of this failure to forecast the magnitude of the Soviet crisis. ... I never heard a suggestion from the CIA ... that numerous Soviets recognized a growing systemic economic problem." Turner said this failure was a consequence of deliberate distortion by those in the upper echelon of the CIA who were helping to sell the Reagan administration's defense buildup, a view backed by former CIA analyst Melvin Goodman at Gates's 1991 confirmation hearings: "[William] Casey seized on every opportunity to exaggerate the Soviet threat ... [while] Gates' role in this activity was to corrupt the process and the ethics of intelligence."

Reviewing the third installment of Gates's memoirs in 2016, Goodman said, "In my 24 years at the CIA, there was never the kind of toxic atmosphere that existed when Gates served as deputy director for intelligence, deputy director of CIA, and finally director of CIA." According to Newsweek, Gates, as deputy director of CIA, allegedly vouched for the comprehensiveness of a CIA study presented to the Senate and President Reagan alleging that the Soviet Union played a role in the 1981 shooting of Pope John Paul II. A CIA internal review later denounced the report as being skewed, but that Gates did not try to influence the report's conclusions.

Shortly after his retirement from his tenure as Defense Secretary in summer 2011, during a meeting of the National Security Council Principals Committee, Gates highlighted many of the measures taken by the U.S. to advance Israel's security during the Obama administration, including providing access to state of the art weaponry, assisting with the development of missile-defense systems, and sharing high-level intelligence, before expressing his view that the U.S. has received nothing in return from the Israeli government with regard to the peace process. According to senior U.S. administration sources, other officials present offered no rebuttal to Gates's analysis. This was not the first time Gates publicly expressed frustration with the Netanyahu government, with which he had worked hard to provide wide-scale and deep military cooperation. The Likud party of Israel responded to Gates's description of Benjamin Netanyahu as a danger to Israel's future by claiming that most Israelis support the prime minister.

== Publications ==
=== Articles ===
- The Dysfunctional Superpower, Foreign Affairs, September 29, 2023
- The Scowcroft Model, Foreign Affairs, August 13, 2020
- The Overmilitarization of American Foreign Policy, Foreign Affairs, June 2, 2020
- Helping Others Defend Themselves, Foreign Affairs, May 1, 2010
- A Balanced Strategy, Foreign Affairs, January 1, 2009
- The CIA and Foreign Policy, Foreign Affairs, December 1, 1987

== Awards and decorations ==
Gates's awards and decorations include:

Government awards

- Presidential Medal of Freedom
- Presidential Citizens Medal
- National Security Medal
- National Intelligence Distinguished Service Medal (2 awards)
- Distinguished Intelligence Medal (3 awards)

Other awards

- Liberty Medal (2011)
- Eagle Scout
- Distinguished Eagle Scout Award
- Silver Buffalo Award
- Vigil Honor, Order of the Arrow
- Distinguished Service Award (DSA), Order of the Arrow, August 4, 2015
- Honorary Doctorate of Philosophy from Kansas State University
- Honorary Doctorate of Humane Letters from College of William and Mary
- Honorary Doctorate of Humane Letters from Georgetown University
- Honorary [Doctorate of Humane Letters from Indiana University
- Honorary Doctorate of Humane Letters from The University of Oklahoma
- Honorary Doctorate of Humane Letters from Yale University
- Honorary Doctorate of Laws from the University of Notre Dame
- Honorary Doctorate of Public Administration from The University of South Carolina
- College of William and Mary – Algernon Sydney Sullivan Award
- College of William and Mary Alumni Association – Alumni Medallion
- Corps of Cadets Hall of Honor (First and only Non-Corps Honoree) – Texas A&M University
- Arthur S. Flemming Award of 1978
- Golden Plate Award of the American Academy of Achievement (1992)
- George Bush Award (2007) – George Bush Presidential Library Foundation
- Aviation Week & Space Technology Magazine: Person of the Year 2008
- MTV University Man of the Year 2010
- Foreign Policy's list of top global thinkers for "being America's last bipartisan figure"
- Sylvanus Thayer Award (United States Military Academy)
- Robert C. Vance Distinguished Lecturer, Central Connecticut State University, 2011
- Order of Bahrain, 1st Degree
- Grand Cordon of the Order of the Rising Sun, 2017

== Bibliography ==
- Robert Gates, From the Shadows: The Ultimate Insider's Story of Five presidents and How They Won the Cold War. Simon & Schuster; Reprint edition (1997). ISBN 978-0684810812
- Robert Gates, Duty: Memoirs of a Secretary at War. Alfred A. Knopf (2014). ISBN 978-0307959478
- Robert Gates, A Passion for Leadership: Lessons on Change and Reform from Fifty Years of Public Service (2016). ISBN 978-0307959492
- Robert Gates, Exercise of Power: American Failures, Successes, and a New Path Forward in the Post-Cold War World. Alfred A. Knopf (2020) ISBN 978-1524731885
- Robert Gates, US Intelligence and the End of the Cold War, 1999, CIA
- Robert Gates, Frontline The Gulf War: An Oral History: Interview with Robert Gates, Deputy National Security Advisor, 2001, PBS.org
- Robert Gates, A Balanced Strategy: Reprogramming the Pentagon for a New Age, Foreign Affairs (January/February 2009)

Government offices
| Preceded by Harry Rowen | Chair of the National Intelligence Council; 1983–1986 | Succeeded by Frank Horton III |
| Preceded by John McMahon | Deputy Director of Central Intelligence; 1986–1989 | Succeeded by Dick Kerr |
| Preceded by William Webster | Director of Central Intelligence; 1991–1993 | Succeeded by James Woolsey |
Political offices
| Preceded by John Negroponte | Deputy National Security Advisor; 1989–1991 | Succeeded by Jonathan Howe |
| Preceded by Donald Rumsfeld | United States Secretary of Defense; 2006–2011 | Succeeded by Leon Panetta |
Academic offices
| Preceded by Ray Bowen | President of Texas A&M University; 2002–2006 | Succeeded by Ed Davis; Acting |
| Preceded by Sandra Day O'Connor | Chancellor of the College of William and Mary; 2012–present | Incumbent |
Boy Scouts of America
| Preceded by Wayne Perry | President of the Boy Scouts of America; 2014–2016 | Succeeded by Randall L. Stephenson |
U.S. order of precedence (ceremonial)
| Preceded by Mary E. Peters as Former U.S. Cabinet Member | Order of precedence of the United States as Former U.S. Cabinet Member | Succeeded by Michael Mukasey as Former U.S. Cabinet Member |
