= United States security clearance =

Permission to access restricted information

A United States security clearance is an official determination that an individual may access information classified by the United States Government. Security clearances are hierarchical; each level grants the holder access to information in that level and the levels below it.

The US president can declassify previously classified information, following a detailed process.

== Gaining access ==
For people that require a security clearance to get access to classified information, an in-depth background investigation is conducted primarily by the Defense Counterintelligence and Security Agency, and the recipient signs a nondisclosure agreement.

As of 2017, certain government officials (but not their staff) are granted access to classified information needed to do their jobs without a background check: members of the U.S. Senate and House of Representatives for committee work, federal judges and state supreme court judges for adjudicating cases, and state governors. Attorneys representing clients in cases with classified materials require a background check, but there is a reduced-scrutiny procedure for time-sensitive access. This ex officio access can be revoked.

Pending a full security clearance, an applicant may be granted an interim security clearance of indefinite duration, which gives the applicant access to some classified information while the original application is being vetted.

Access to any particular piece of information requires "need-to-know." In some cases, this requirement is only nominal, as some classified information is widely published on secure networks. In other cases, there is a formal need-to-know determination. In addition to such a determination, Special Access Programs and Sensitive Compartmented Information may require additional investigation and adjudication of the prospective clearance holder.

== Prices ==
Applicants do not pay out of pocket for a security clearance; the cost of the background investigation is billed to the requesting agency by the Defense Counterintelligence and Security Agency (DCSA), which conducts most federal background investigations. For fiscal year 2026, DCSA's standard-service billing rates for initial investigations are:

- Tier 1 (low-risk, non-sensitive positions): $197
- Tier 2 (moderate-risk public trust positions): $455
- Tier 3 (Confidential and Secret clearances): $455
- Tier 4 (high-risk public trust positions): $4,460
- Tier 5 (Top Secret and SCI eligibility): $5,890

A Tier 5 reinvestigation costs $3,230. Priority service, where available, is billed at a higher rate (for example, $6,361 for a priority Tier 5 investigation).

== Authority ==
The authority for classifying information and granting security clearances to access that information is found in executive orders (EOs) and US Federal law. The United States' National Security Information (NSI) has been classified under Executive Order 13526, but since 10 January 2017 the rules were modified by James Clapper as Security Executive Agent Directive 4 in the closing days of the Obama administration. Information may be classified under this Order if a classification authority determines its unauthorized release could cause damage to the national defense or foreign relations of the United States. Information concerning nuclear weapons and fissile material may be classified under the Atomic Energy Act of 1954 (AEA). These clearances are only granted by the US Department of Energy. The clearance process for access to NSI or AEA information is substantially aligned. Under Executive Order 12968, the investigative and adjudicative guidelines for NSI and AEA clearances are identical. This enables reciprocity between NSI and AEA clearances, although some exceptions exist.

The United States' Executive Order 12968's standards are binding on all of the United States government agencies that handle classified information, but it allows certain agency heads to establish Special Access Programs (SAPs) with additional, but not duplicative, investigative and adjudicative requirements. The Intelligence Community's Sensitive Compartmented Information (SCI) control systems are a family of SAPs, and SCI eligibility must be granted prior to accessing any particular control system or compartment (which may require additional investigation or adjudication). SCI eligibility policy is described in Intelligence Community Directive 704 and its implementing policy guidance Within the Intelligence Community, the access to SCI information is far more common than "Collateral Top Secret information," and therefore operatives will routinely include SCI in a TS product, just to ensure they do not have to meet the "cradle-to-grave" accountability requirements of Collateral TS information. Any additional clearance measures used by SAPs must be approved by the Office of Management and Budget, which has generally limited such measures to polygraphs, exclusion of persons with non-US immediate family members, requiring more frequent reinvestigations, and requiring annual updates to security questionnaires.

== Hierarchy ==
A security clearance is granted to an individual and generally recognizes a maximum level of clearance. Exceptions include levels above compartmentalized access or when an individual is cleared for a certain type of data. The President of the United States will be given access to any government or military information that they request, even if they would not otherwise be able to normally obtain a security clearance were they not the President. Having obtained a certain level security clearance does not mean that one automatically has access to or is given access to information cleared for that clearance level in the absence of a demonstrated "need to know". The need-to-know determination is made by a disclosure officer, who may work in the office of origin of the information. The specified need to know must be germane to the prospective user's mission, or of necessity for the integrity of a specified security apparatus.

=== Controlled Unclassified ===
Controlled Unclassified does not represent a clearance designation, but rather a clearance level at which information distribution is controlled. Controlled Unclassified designates information that may be illegal to distribute. This information is available when needed by government employees, such as United States Department of Defense (DoD) employees, but the designation signifies that the information should not be redistributed to users not designated to use it on an operational basis. For example, the organization and processes of an information-technology system may be designated Controlled Unclassified to users for whom the operational details of the system are non-critical. Controlled Unclassified information went by many other names internally, an example being For Official Use Only (FOUO). Executive Order 13556, standardized the naming of Controlled Unclassified Information.

=== Public Trust Position ===
Despite common misconception, this designation is not a security clearance, and is not the same as the confidential designation. Certain positions which require access to sensitive information, but not information which is classified, must obtain this designation through a background check. In the US, Public Trust Positions can either be moderate-risk or high-risk. Depending on the federal agency involved, individuals found unsuitable may be able to appeal that decision.

=== Confidential ===
This is hierarchically the first security clearance to get, typically requiring a few weeks to a few months of investigation. A Confidential clearance requires a NACLC investigation which dates back 7 years on the subject's record and must be renewed (with another investigation) every 15 years.

=== Secret ===
A Secret clearance, a.k.a Collateral Secret or Ordinary Secret, requires a few months to a year to investigate, depending on the individual's background. Some instances wherein individuals would take longer than normal to be investigated are many past residences, having residences in foreign countries, having relatives outside the United States, or significant ties with non-US citizens. Unpaid bills as well as criminal charges will more than likely disqualify an applicant for approval. However, a bankruptcy will be evaluated on a case-by-case basis and is not an automatic disqualifier. Poor financial history is the number-one cause of rejection, and foreign activities and criminal record are also common causes for disqualification. A Secret clearance requires a NACLC, and a Credit investigation; it must also be re-investigated every 10 years. Investigative requirements for DoD clearances, which apply to most civilian contractor situations, are contained in the Personnel Security Program issuance known as DoD Regulation 5200.2-R, at part C3.4.2.

=== Top Secret ===
A Top Secret, or "TS", clearance, is often given as the result of a Single Scope Background Investigation (SSBI). Top Secret clearances, in general, afford one access to data that affects national security, counterterrorism/counterintelligence, or other highly sensitive data. There are far fewer individuals with TS clearances than Secret clearances. A TS clearance can take as few as 3 to 6 months to obtain, but often it takes 6 to 18 months. In most instances, an individual with Top Secret clearance undergoes an SSBI Period Reinvestigation (SSBI-PR) every five years.

=== Compartmented ===
As with TS clearances, Sensitive Compartmented Information (SCI) clearances are assigned only after one has been through the rigors of a Single Scope Background Investigation and a special adjudication process for evaluating the investigation. SCI access, however, is assigned only in "compartments". These compartments are necessarily separated from each other with respect to organization, so that an individual with access to one compartment will not necessarily have access to another. Each compartment may include its own additional special requirements and clearance process. An individual may be granted access to, or read into, a compartment for any period of time.

Top secret clearance might be required to access:

- Communications intelligence, a subset of SIGINT
- Design or stockpile information about nuclear weapons
- Nuclear targeting

Such compartmentalized clearances may be expressed as "John has a TS/SCI", whereby all clearance descriptors are spelled out verbally. For example, the US National Security Agency once used specialized terms such as "Umbra", This classification is reported to be a compartment within the "Special Intelligence" compartment of SCI. The various NSA compartments have been simplified; all but the most sensitive compartments are marked "CCO", meaning "handle through COMINT channels only".

The US Department of Defense establishes, separately from intelligence compartments, special access programs (SAP) when the vulnerability of specific information is considered exceptional and the normal criteria for determining eligibility for access applicable to information classified at the same level are not deemed sufficient to protect the information from unauthorized disclosure. The number of people cleared for access to such programs is typically kept low. Information about stealth technology, for example, often requires such access.

Area-specific clearances include:

- L clearance (Department of Energy)
- Q clearance (Department of Energy)
- Yankee White (working with the president and vice president)

== Jobs that require a clearance ==
There are two different types of jobs that require clearance: public trust and low-risk positions, which require a Standard Form 85 application, and positions with access to classified information, which require a Standard Form 86 application.

Anyone with access to classified data requires a clearance at or higher than the level at which the data is classified. For this reason, security clearances are required for a wide range of jobs, from senior management to janitorial. According to a 2013 Washington Post article, over 3.6 million Americans had top-secret clearances; almost one-third of them worked for private companies, rather than for the U.S. government.

Jobs that require a security clearance can be found either as positions working directly for the federal government or as authorized federal contractors. Over time, more clearance jobs are being outsourced to contractors. Due to an overall shortage in security-cleared candidates and a long time frame to obtain the credentials for an uncleared worker, those with clearance are often paid more than their non-cleared equivalent counterparts. According to one 2010 estimate, "people with security clearances are in the top 10 percent of wage earners in the country".

== Requirements for a clearance ==
The vetting process for a security clearance is usually undertaken only when someone is hired or transferred into a position that requires access to classified information. The DCSA is the primary security agency that conducts background investigations for the Federal Government, conducting 95% of all background investigations for over 100 agencies and conducting approximately 2 million background investigations each year.

The employee is typically fingerprinted and asked to provide information about themselves. This becomes a starting point for an investigation into the candidate's suitability. The process has been streamlined and now requires the person who needs clearance to input the information online using E-qip; five days are allowed for data input. Having the older paper form can be helpful for collecting and organizing the information in advance. The information on an investigation and its status is stored in either JPAS or Scattered Castles.

Investigative work is usually at least one of the following types:

- National Agency Check with Local Agency Check and Credit Check (NACLC). An NACLC is required for a Secret, L, and CONFIDENTIAL access. (See: Background check)
- Single Scope Background Investigation (SSBI). An SSBI is required for Top Secret, Q, and SCI access, and involves agents contacting employers, coworkers and other individuals. Standard elements include checks of employment; education; organization affiliations; local agencies; where the subject has lived, worked, or gone to school; and interviews with persons who know the individual. The investigation may include an NACLC on the candidate's spouse or cohabitant and any immediate family members who are U.S. citizens other than by birth or who are not U.S. citizens.
- Polygraph. Some agencies may require polygraph examinations. The most common examinations are Counter Intelligence (CI) and Full-Scope (Lifestyle) polygraphs. While a positive SSBI is sufficient for access to SCI-level information, polygraphs are routinely administered for "staff-like" access to particular agencies.

If issues of concern surface during any phase of security processing, coverage is expanded to resolve those issues. At lower levels, interim clearances may be issued to individuals who are presently under investigation, but who have passed some preliminary, automatic process. Such automatic processes include things such as credit checks, felony checks, and so on. An interim clearance may be denied (although the final clearance may still be granted) for having a large amount of debt, having a foreign spouse, for having admitted to seeing a doctor for a mental health condition, or for having admitted to other items of security concern (such as a criminal record or a history of drug use.). When security concerns arise for an individual, which could bar them from holding a security clearance, adjudicators may also look at the Whole-Person Concept as a source of potential mitigation so that the person may still be granted a security clearance.

The high-level clearance process can be lengthy, sometimes taking a year or more. In recent years, there has been an increased backlog of cases which has been attributed to the economic climate. The long time needed for new appointees to be cleared has been cited as hindering the presidential transition process.

== Security briefings ==
In the US, once the clearance is granted, the candidate is briefed on "the proper safeguarding of classified information and on the criminal, civil, and administrative sanctions that may be imposed on an individual who fails to protect classified information from unauthorized disclosure." They are also required to sign an approved non-disclosure agreement (e.g., form SF-312). High-level clearances are reviewed periodically and any "adverse information" reports received at any time can trigger a review. When a cleared person leaves their job, they are often "debriefed"—reminded of their ongoing obligations to protect the information they were allowed to see, and the possible consequences should they fail to uphold those obligations. According to NISPOM Chapter 3, newly cleared employees are required to receive an initial security briefing before having access to classified information. This training helps them understand the threat, risks to classified information, how to protect the classified information, security procedures and duties as they apply to their job. This training is followed up by refresher training that reinforces the initial security briefing.

== Dual citizenship ==
Dual citizenship is associated with two categories of security concerns: foreign influence and foreign preference. Dual citizenship in itself is not the major problem in obtaining or retaining security clearance in the United States. If a security clearance applicant's dual citizenship is "based solely on parents' citizenship or birth in a foreign country", that can be a mitigating condition. However, exercising (taking advantage of the entitlements of) a non-U.S. citizenship can cause problems. For example, possession and/or use of a foreign passport is a condition disqualifying from security clearance and "is not mitigated by reasons of personal convenience, safety, requirements of foreign law, or the identity of the foreign country" as is explicitly clarified in a Department of Defense policy memorandum which defines a guideline requiring that "any clearance be denied or revoked unless the applicant surrenders the foreign passport or obtains official permission for its use from the appropriate agency of the United States Government". This guideline has been followed in administrative rulings by the Department of Defense (DoD) Defense Office of Hearings and Appeals (DOHA) office of Industrial Security Clearance Review (ISCR), which decides cases involving security clearances for Contractor personnel doing classified work for all DoD components. In one such case, an administrative judge ruled that it is not clearly consistent with U.S. national interest to grant a request for a security clearance to an applicant who was a dual national of the United States and Ireland. DOHA can rule on issues involving the granting of security clearances.

== Limited Access Authorizations (LAA) ==
A non-US born person working in the United States on an H-1B visa may obtain a special clearance with access to secret information if they are in a critical role of a job that requires authorization.

== See also ==
- Security clearance
- List of U.S. security clearance terms
- List of established military terms
- List of government and military acronyms
- Security Advisory Opinion
