= Linda Combs =

American controller

Linda M. Combs
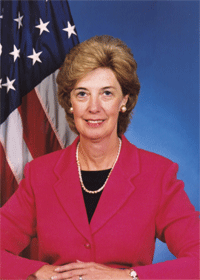

Controller, Office of Management and Budget
- In office 2005 – August 2007
- President: George W. Bush
- Preceded by: Linda Springer

Personal details
- Born: June 29, 1946 Lenoir, North Carolina, U.S.
- Died: October 19, 2023 (aged 77) Winston-Salem, North Carolina, U.S.
- Party: Republican
- Spouse: Dave Combs
- Profession: Government Official/Educator/Entrepreneur

Linda Morrison Combs (June 29, 1946 – October 19, 2023) was a former U.S. federal government official. She was the Controller of the Office of Management and Budget in the Executive Office of the President at the White House. She had five Presidential Appointments confirmed by the United States Senate and served under three Presidents: Presidents Ronald Reagan, George H. W. Bush, and George W. Bush.

In 2014, North Carolina Gov. Pat McCrory appointed her State Controller on an interim basis. He subsequently nominated Combs to continue in the position. She was later confirmed by the North Carolina General Assembly and took the oath of office on May 27, 2016.

== OMB Service ==
President George W. Bush nominated her on February 28, 2005 to be the Controller of OMB. The United States Senate unanimously confirmed Combs on June 24, 2005.

As Controller, Combs oversaw all of Federal financial management, was the head of the Office of Federal Financial Management, and chaired the U.S. Chief Financial Officers Council. She owned three initiatives of the President's Management Agenda: improving financial performance, eliminating improper payments, and real property.

Also, Combs oversaw Government-wide financial management policies, and requirements. Specifically she focused on financial results in the largest 24 departments and agencies in the United States Federal Government. She oversaw about $2.47 trillion in spending each year.

Notably, during Combs's tenure at OMB, the Federal CFO community:

1. For the first time in history and for the second straight year successfully accelerated financial reporting so that audited financial statements were published by ever major agency within 45 days of the close of the fiscal year (a pace that significantly bettered private sector reporting and improved on past Government results when agencies had taken as long as 5 months to report);
2. Obtained clean audit opinions in 19 of the 24 largest agencies for two straight years, and decreased the number of material weaknesses by more than 15% despite tougher audit standards (compared to achieving only one clean audit in 1990 and only six in 1996 for those same 24 agencies);
3. Eliminated approximately $9 billion in improper payments — a 17% decrease from 2004.
4. Developed and reported the first ever government-wide inventory of the Federal real property assets, reporting data on more than 1.2 million assets worldwide, and disposing of $3.5 billion in excess property from 2004.

Combs retired from the OMB in 2007.

== Early life and education ==
A native of Hudson, North Carolina, Combs graduated from Hudson High School and would then earn an Associate of Arts degree at Gardner-Webb University, Bachelor of Science and Master's degrees from Appalachian State University, and a Doctorate in Educational Administration from Virginia Polytechnic Institute and State University. She is also a graduate of the Program for Senior Managers in Government at Harvard University.

== Government service and private sector career ==
Combs was previously appointed by President George W. Bush and confirmed by the United States Senate to the position of Assistant Secretary for Budget and Programs and Chief Financial Officer at the U.S. Department of Transportation (DOT). As Assistant Secretary, Combs oversaw all budgetary and management functions of the Department, including budget development and budget execution. As Chief Financial Officer, she was responsible for oversight of the Department’s $57 billion appropriation, the Government Performance and Results Act, as well as general monitoring of programs.

Prior to her appointment at DOT, Combs held a Presidential Appointment, confirmed by the Senate, at the United States Environmental Protection Agency, where she served as Chief Financial Officer from 2001–2003.

During the previous Reagan and Bush Administrations, Combs served in various oversight roles and executive level management positions at the U.S. Department of Education, U.S. Department of Veterans Affairs, and U.S. Department of the Treasury.

Prior to government service, and following a successful career of over ten years in instructional and administrative positions in the Winston-Salem/Forsyth County School System, she was elected in 1980 to the Board of Education in Winston-Salem/Forsyth County, North Carolina. In 1986 she was appointed as Education Advisor to the Governor of North Carolina, James G. Martin.

Combs has also spent a number of years in the private sector. In her role of Operations Officer and Manager of National Direct Student Loans for Wachovia Corporation, Combs was responsible for the general management of National Direct Student Loan Operations, with an expense budget that affected several million dollars of annual revenue. For ten years, Combs and her husband founded and built their own highly successful private record label and music catalog company to achieve worldwide distribution of CDs, videos, and music books. She is also a published author on family caregiving, and was a national spokesperson for Warner Lambert Pharmaceutical Company.

Before returning to the federal government in 2001, Combs was a member of the Board of Visitors of the Babcock Graduate School of Management at Wake Forest University, Chair of the Board of Directors of the Appalachian State University Foundation, and a member of the Board of Trustees at Gardner-Webb University. She also served on several corporate boards.

== Written works ==
- Combs, Linda Morrison (1994). A long good-bye : reflections on dealing with Alzheimers. Winston-Salem, N.C.: Combs Pub. ISBN 0-9640312-0-5. OCLC 32435709.
- Combs, Linda Morrison (1999). A long good-bye and beyond : coping with Alzheimer's. Wilsonville, Or.: BooksPartners. ISBN 1-885221-83-5. OCLC 41233908.
- Combs, Linda Morrison (1985). Education in the year 2035 : a Delphi study to identify possible futures of the public secondary school. Thesis (Ed. D.)--Virginia Polytechnic Institute and State University, 1985. OCLC 14231834.

== Awards and honors ==
Award	Organization	Year
Order of the Long Leaf Pine	State of North Carolina - Office of the Governor	2022
Distinguished Service Award	NASACT	2022
Order of the Long Leaf Pine	State of North Carolina - Office of the Governor	2016
"National Leadership Award"	Association of Government Accountants	2005
"Crystal Eagle Award"	Budget Performance and Integration	2004
Rhododendron Society	Reich College of Education at Appalachian State University	2004
"Hall of Honor"	Caldwell County Schools	2003

== Timeline ==
- 1968–1979: Teacher, Coach, Reading Coordinator, Assistant Principal, Workshop Leader Winston-Salem/Forsyth County School System (Winston-Salem, NC)
- 1979–1982: Operations Officer and Manager, Wachovia Corporation (Winston-Salem, NC)
- 1982 - 1984: The Executive Secretary, U.S. Department of Education (Washington, DC)
- 1984 - 1986: Deputy Under Secretary for Management, U.S. Department of Education (Washington, DC)
- 1986 - 1987: Education Advisor to the Governor of North Carolina (Raleigh, North Carolina)
- 1987 - 1989: Acting Associate Administrator for Management, U.S. Department of Veterans Affairs (Washington, DC)
- 1989 - 1991: Assistant Secretary for Management and Chief Financial Officer, US Department of the Treasury (Washington, DC)
- 1991 - 2001: Caregiver, Author, Consultant, Spokesperson, Entrepreneur (Winston-Salem, NC)
- 2001 - 2003: Chief Financial Officer, United States Environmental Protection Agency (Washington, DC)
- 2003 - 2005: Assistant Secretary for Budget and Programs and Chief Financial Officer, United States Department of Transportation (Washington, DC)
- 2005 - 2007: Controller, Office of Management and Budget, Executive Office of the President (Washington, DC)
- 2014 – 2022: Controller, State of North Carolina (Raleigh, NC)

Preceded by Linda Springer	Controller, Office of Management and Budget; 2005-2007	Succeeded by Danny Werfel (Acting)
