= Margaret Weichert =

American government executive

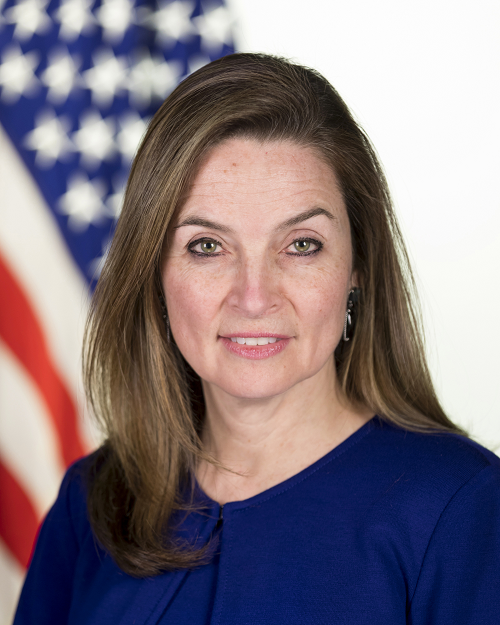

Deputy Director for Management of the Office of Management and Budget
- In office February 28, 2018 – March 25, 2020
- President: Donald Trump
- Preceded by: Beth Cobert
- Succeeded by: Michael Rigas

Acting Director of the Office of Personnel Management
- In office October 5, 2018 – September 16, 2019
- President: Donald Trump
- Preceded by: Jeff Tien Han Pon
- Succeeded by: Dale Cabaniss

Personal details
- Education: Georgetown University; University of Sussex; University of California, Berkeley

Margaret Weichert is an American businesswoman, inventor, and government executive, was Deputy Director for Management at the Office of Management and Budget from February 28, 2018 until March 25, 2020. Concurrently, she was Acting Director at the Office of Personnel Management from October 2018 until September 16, 2019.

She has served as a principal at Ernst & Young since 2017. Weichert has also held executive leadership positions at Market Platform Dynamics, First Data, Bank of America, and Andersen Consulting focused on strategy, innovation, and business process improvement in banking and payments technology. In 1999, she co-founded an internet company, Achex, Inc., and sold that company to First Data in 2001. Achex was an online payment services developer specializing in secure checking account transfers over the internet. Weichert has been named as an inventor on 14 U.S. patents related to online financial services. She has served since 2010 on the Technology Association of Georgia Fintech Steering Committee.
