= Local Independent Charities =

Group of charities in the United States

Local Independent Charities of America is a federated group of over 700 charities serving clients in a variety of fields, involving child welfare, homelessness, poverty, hunger, and animal welfare. They screen and certify member organizations, and prepare them to participate in at-work employee charitable fund drives.

== History ==
Originally started to prepare charities to participate in federal charitable fund drives, they have as of 2011 started working with fund drives at state and city levels. Their website allows searching on charity types, and accepts online donations. Currently they provide listings in twelve states.

== See also ==
- Combined Federal Campaign
- Chicago 2011 campaign
