= Austin Lipari =

American attorney

Advisor to the Federal Energy Regulatory Commission
- President: Donald Trump

Senior Counsel at Department of Justice

Personal details
- Political party: Republican
- Education: Catholic University of America (BA); Catholic University of America (JD)

Austin Lipari is an American attorney who has served as an advisor to the Federal Energy Regulatory Commission. He was previously Senior Counsel to the Department of Justice, serving on the team that shepherded Justice Amy Coney Barrett through the confirmation process. Before that, he was at the Office of Personnel Management's Office of General Counsel
