= Federal Executive Boards =

Government Executive Branch

The Federal Executive Boards (FEBs) are departments created by the US Office of Personnel Management in the United States Department of the Interior. They intend to expand federal government presence, and interdepartmental and interagency coordination amongst the various components of the US Government, in its primary centers of operations across the United States. Currently organized into 26 boards, across four regions, with plans for expansion, their purpose is to connect Washington D.C. and local communities.

== History ==
On 10 November 1961, President John F. Kennedy established the Federal Executive Boards. Kennedy stated in the Memorandum, "I want coordination of government activities outside of Washington significantly strengthened".

== Modernization and transformation ==
In 2023, both the President's Management Agenda and FY 23 Budget initiated a transformation aiming to solidify FEBs as a vital resource for senior leaders and communities across the nation. Now under the full oversight of OPM, the FEB Forward initiative introduces a centralized funding model and governance structure to bolster the role of the FEBs as a key resource for federal agencies beyond the National Capital Region.

== The Centre for FEBs ==
Housed within the Office of Personnel Management (OPM), the Centre for FEBs provides national, regional, and field leadership for the Federal Executive Boards (FEBs). It intends to give coordination across all boards distributed across the Eastern, Central, Southern, and Western regions of the United States.
