= India Partners =

India Partners is a U.S. non-governmental organization that partners with indigenous managed charities in India on projects to help the poor.

== Information ==
India Partners has been operating since 1972. The organization is founded in Eugene, Oregon. It is a member of the Combined Federal Campaign and Evangelical Council for Financial Accountability. India Partners also directs volunteer teams, speakers, and sponsorship programs. The organizations focuses on certain areas such as partnerships, children, women, being self-sufficient, disaster relief, and medical health. India Partners has received assistance and partnered with various groups over the years to make their work possible.

== Staff ==
The President and CEO of India Partners is John Sparks.
