= LFCC =

LFCC is a four-letter acronym that can stand for:

- Local Federal Coordinating Committee of the Combined Federal Campaign
- The ICAO code for Cahors - Lalbenque Airport in France
- Lord Fairfax Community College, Middletown, Virginia
- Low-Fat, Complex Carbohydrate
- London Fields Cricket Club
- London Film & Comic Con
