= Polo Step (code name) =

Classified as Top Secret, Polo Step was a United States Department of Defense code name or ‘compartment’ that was initially created in the late 1990s to designate closely held planning information on covert operations against Al Qaeda in Afghanistan. A person could have a Top Secret clearance, but if they would not have a need to know about the planning as well, they did not have a ‘Polo Step’ authorization.

Following the September 11, 2001 attacks, ‘Polo Step’ started to be used by United States Central Command to be the planning compartment for offensive operations against Iraq. It appears that following one of the many planning discussions that General Tommy Franks had with colleagues, information about the planning was distributed and re-distributed around the Pentagon until it reached someone that leaked it to William Arkin, a researcher. Arkin wrote about the planning process in the Los Angeles Times with what he described as ‘electric’ results. General Franks describes in his book ‘American Soldier’ how he conveyed his anger to Secretary of Defense Donald Rumsfeld. He told the Secretary that ‘I’d like everyone in OSD and the JCS … polygraphed to find out who leaked the information'. Investigations were made, and though leaks continued, Franks says in his book that none were so damaging. The leaker has never been located.

== See also ==
- List of U.S. Department of Defense code names
