= Jason Tengco =

Filipino-American political strategist

Jason Tengco is a Filipino-American political strategist formerly serving at the Office of Personnel Management as a White House liaison under the administration of President Joe Biden.
