= Frederick Nutt =

American government official

Frederick M. Nutt

Assistant Administrator for Management
- Incumbent
- Assumed office April 2019
- President: Donald Trump

Personal details
- Born: Reedville, Virginia
- Education: Virginia Tech

Frederick Martin Nutt is an American government official currently serving as USAID's Assistant Administrator for Management. He was appointed to the position in April 2019. Previously, he served as a senior advisor of the Office of Management and Budget (OMB), he has been nominated by President Donald Trump to become Controller at the OMB. Nutt previously worked as senior advisor to the vice president for management at the Overseas Private Investment Corporation where he was responsible for managing financial resources supporting information technology, acquisition, facilities, and security operations. Nutt also worked at the newly created Millennium Challenge Corporation, where he initiated management operations, including financial and management information systems. Prior to this, Nutt was senior advisor to the chief financial officer at the Environmental Protection Agency where he worked on implementing the President's Management Agenda. From 1995 to 1997, he worked on budget and appropriations legislation in the United States House of Representatives while serving in the Office of the Speaker.
