= United States Tech Force =

US federal government hiring initiative

- US Tech Force
- Formation: December 15, 2025
- Region served: United States
- Administered by: Office of Personnel Management (OPM)
- Website: techforce.gov

The U.S. Tech Force (also styled as US Tech Force, Tech Force, or Government Tech Force) is a federal hiring initiative launched by the second Donald Trump administration in December 2025. The program, administered by the Office of Personnel Management (OPM), aims to recruit about 1,000 early-career technology professionals into two-year government jobs to modernize federal IT systems, advance artificial intelligence (AI) capabilities, and address technological gaps in government operations.

The initiative is an effort to plug capability gaps created by Trump-administration efforts to shrink the federal government, which led to the departure of some 220,000 federal employees, including many in IT.

The initiative seeks early-career workers; officials said it would offer competitive salaries and opportunities to work on high-impact government technology projects.

Major technology companies—including Amazon, Apple, Microsoft, Nvidia, Meta, Google, and OpenAI—agreed to help identify and refer candidates. Candidates are allowed to take Tech Force positions on leaves of absence and without divesting their stock, raising conflict-of-interest questions.

In January 2026, OPM direction Scott Kupor said the deadline for applying to Tech Force was being extended because of "tremendous interest" without saying how many people had actually applied.

Also in December 2025, news broke that the administration is planning another novel use of private-sector workers: hiring cybersecurity firms for offensive cyber operations.

== See also ==
- Mission Genesis
- United States Digital Service
