= Katherine Archuleta =

American educator and political executive

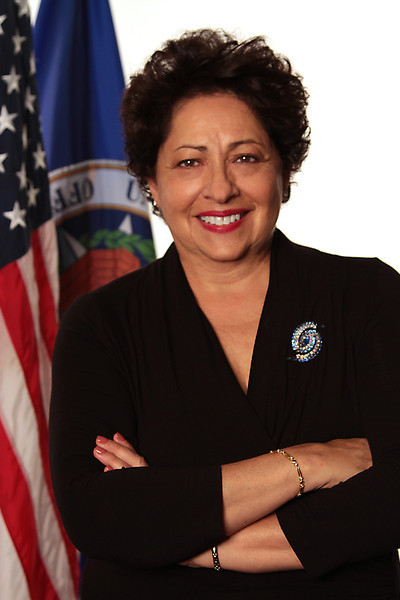

Director of the United States Office of Personnel Management
- In office November 4, 2013 – July 10, 2015
- President: Barack Obama
- Preceded by: Elaine D. Kaplan
- Succeeded by: Beth Cobert (Acting)

Personal details
- Born: 1949 (age 75–76); Denver, Colorado, U.S.
- Education: Metropolitan State University, Denver (BA); University of Northern Colorado, Greeley (MEd)

Katherine L. Archuleta (born c.1949) is an American teacher and a political executive. She was the director of the United States Office of Personnel Management. President Barack Obama appointed her on May 23, 2013. She was sworn in on November 4, 2013. She had previously served as National Political Director for Obama's 2012 reelection campaign. Prior to that, she had been executive director of the National Hispanic Cultural Center Foundation in New Mexico, had co-founded the Latina Initiative, had worked at a Denver law firm, and had worked in the Clinton Administration as chief of staff to the Secretary of Transportation, Federico Peña. She became embroiled in controversy after the disclosure of a massive national security breach in June 2015. The hack involved the theft of millions of federal employee records and included security-clearance details dating back 15 years, which prompted lawmakers from both political parties to demand that she resign. On July 10, 2015, Archuleta tendered her resignation.

== Early life and education ==
Archuleta, who is of Mexican descent, was born in Denver, Colorado, raised in Aurora, Colorado, and graduated from Hinkley High School in 1965. She graduated from the Metropolitan State University of Denver with a Bachelor of Arts degree in elementary education in 1971. She also has a master's degree in education from the University of Northern Colorado (1976).

== Career ==
Archuleta was the executive director of the National Hispanic Cultural Center Foundation in Albuquerque, New Mexico, from 2002 to 2005. Before that, she was an administrator for Denver Public Schools. From May 1996 to January 1997, she worked in the political world as a senior advisor to Denver politician Federico Peña. She was deputy chief of staff to Peña from 1983 to 1991, while he was the mayor of Denver. She was also a senior advisor to John Hickenlooper during the time he was mayor of Denver. In 1997, she was on the Board of Trustees of the Institute of American Indian and Alaska Native Culture and Arts Development (also called "Institute of American Indian Arts") in Santa Fe, New Mexico.

=== United States Office of Personnel Management ===
==== Appointment ====
President Obama appointed Archuleta as the director of OPM on May 23, 2013. Announcing the appointment, the White House stated that she would be the first Latina director of OPM. Obama said this helps "create more effective policymaking and better decision-making [for me], because it brings different perspectives to the table." She was confirmed by the Senate on October 30, 2013, on a 62–35 vote, with eight Republicans joining the Democrats in a vote to approve.

==== OPM hack ====
Archuleta faced criticism from both Democrats and Republicans at a June 16, 2015, hearing of the United States House Committee on Oversight and Government Reform in the wake of the revelation of the Office of Personnel Management data breach in 2015. Republican Committee chairman Jason Chaffetz said to her, "your systems were vulnerable, the data was not encrypted, it could be compromised, they were right!" and asked her why she ignored a recommendation to shut the system down in light of its vulnerability. Democrat Stephen Lynch said that he knew less coming out of the hearing than going in, and Archuleta was doing a better job of keeping information from Congress than of keeping it from hackers. The next day, both Chaffetz and Democrat Ted Lieu called on Archuleta to resign. Democrat James Langevin also called for her resignation on June 17, saying "Since 2007, the OPM Inspector General has continuously pointed out serious deficiencies in OPM's cybersecurity posture. OPM's response has been glacial." However, White House spokesman Josh Earnest said that President Obama still had confidence in her.

==== Resignation ====
Archuleta was forced to resign under growing pressure, specifically from members of both parties in the House of Representatives, on Friday, July 10, 2015, less than 24 hours after she told the press that she had no intention of resigning. The White House confirmed her resignation after she visited the Oval Office personally to hand in her resignation. Beth Cobert replaced Archuleta as the acting director of the Office of Personnel Management.

== Personal life ==
Archuleta is married to Edmundo Gonzalez and has a daughter.
