= Intergovernmental Personnel Act =

U.S. law

The Intergovernmental Personnel Act of 1970 is a U.S. law specifying conditions for assigning workers to temporary duties across governmental boundaries, to or from the U.S. federal government and other governments and quasi-governmental organizations.

The implementation of the law on federal side is overseen by the Office of Personnel Management, through the Intergovernmental Personnel Act Mobility Program. It "provides for the temporary assignment of personnel between the Federal Government and state and local governments, colleges and universities, Indian tribal governments, federally funded research and development centers, and other eligible organizations".

The Intergovernmental Personnel Act was modified as the Revised Intergovernmental Personnel Act (IPA) mobility program regulations (5 CFR part 334), and these revisions became effective May 29, 1997. The revisions included two major changes:

- Agencies are now responsible for certifying the eligibility of "other organizations" for participation in the mobility program. Previously, this certification was done by the Office of Personnel Management.
- Agencies need no longer submit assignment agreements to the Office of Personnel Management. The information in this publication will assist agencies in their day-to-day management of the mobility program.

== Other Organizations ==
The Intergovernmental Personnel Act regulations specify that "other organizations" are eligible to participate and define what an "other organization" is. The U.S. Office of Personnel Management does not certify organizations for participation in an IPA agreement. Each Federal Government agency certifies an organization for an IPA agreement. If an organization has already been certified by an agency, this certification is permanent and may apply throughout the Federal Government. Another agency can accept this certification or require an organization to submit the appropriate paperwork for review. Requests for certification should include a copy of:

- Organization's articles of incorporation;
- Bylaws;
- Internal Revenue Service (IRS) letter of nonprofit status; and
- Any other information describing the organization's activities as they relate to the public management concerns of governments or universities.
