= National Background Investigations Bureau =

Successor Agency to the Federal Investigative Services Division

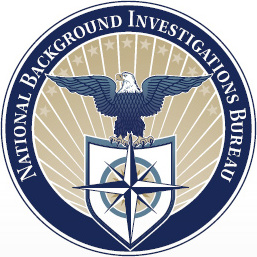
- Seal of the National Background Investigations Bureau

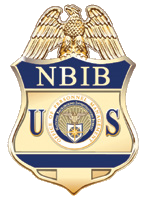
- Badge of the National Background Investigations Bureau

Agency overview
- Formed: October 1, 2016
- Preceding agency: Federal Investigative Services Division
- Dissolved: September 30, 2019
- Superseding agency: Defense Counterintelligence and Security Agency
- Jurisdiction: U.S. federal government
- Headquarters: Washington, D.C.
- Agency executive: Charles S. Phalen, Director
- Parent department: United States Office of Personnel Management

The National Background Investigations Bureau (NBIB) was an agency under the United States Office of Personnel Management of the United States federal government. It was established by President Barack Obama's Executive Order 13741 on September 29, 2016. In September 2019, the agency's affiliation was transferred from the United States Office of Personnel Management to the Defense Counterintelligence and Security Agency of the United States Department of Defense.

== See also ==
- USIS (company)
- Blake Percival
