= Kiran Ahuja =

American attorney and activist (born 1971)

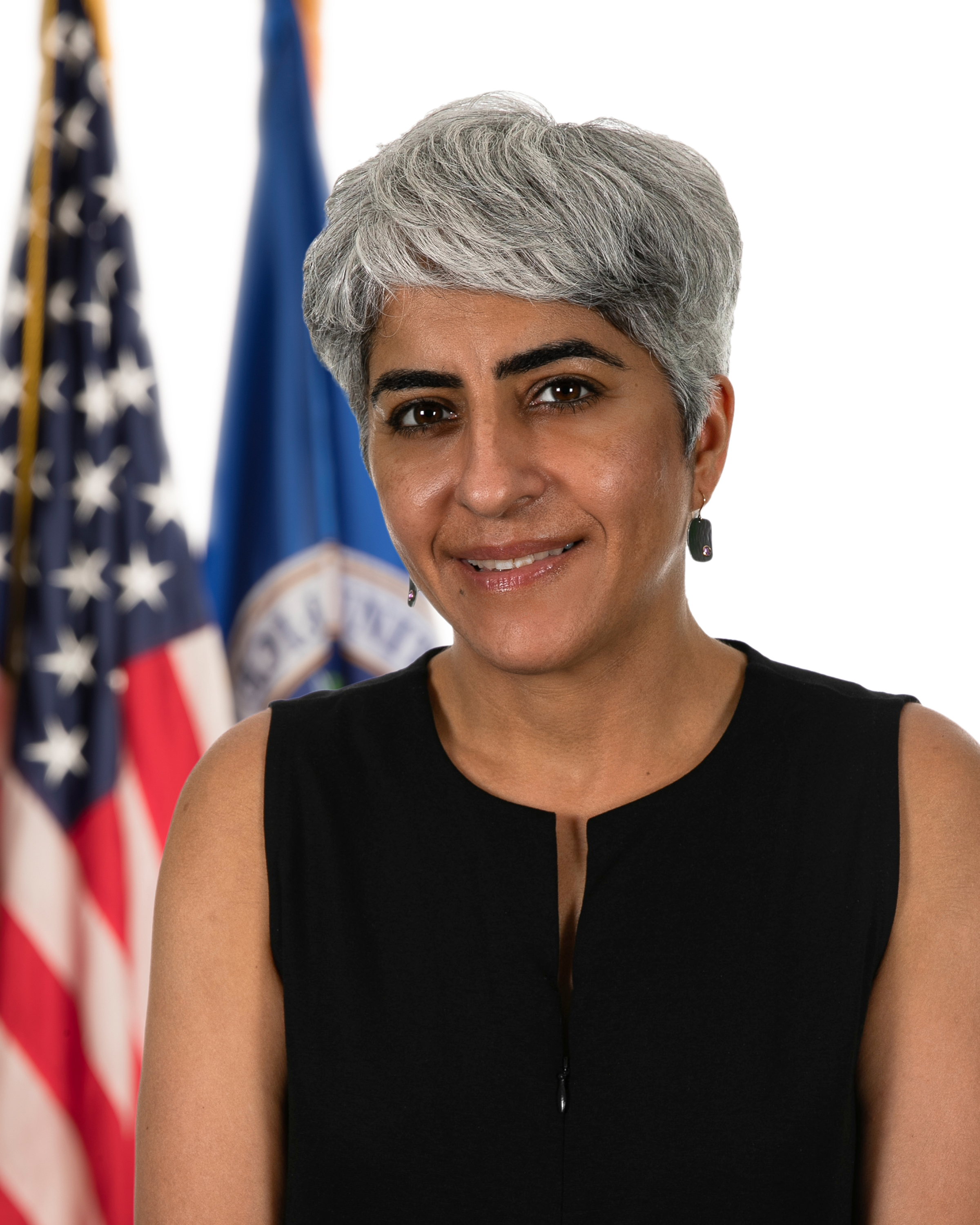
- Official portrait, 2021

Director of the Office of Personnel Management
- In office June 24, 2021 – May 6, 2024
- President: Joe Biden
- Deputy: Rob Shriver
- Preceded by: Dale Cabaniss
- Succeeded by: Scott Kupor

Director of the White House Initiative on Asian Americans and Pacific Islanders
- In office December 2009 – November 2015
- President: Barack Obama
- Preceded by: Jimmy Lee
- Succeeded by: Doua Thor

Personal details
- Born: Kiran Arjandas Ahuja; June 17, 1971 (age 55) India
- Party: Democratic
- Education: Emory University (attended); Spelman College (BA); University of Georgia (JD)

Kiran Arjandas Ahuja (born June 17, 1971) is an American attorney and activist who served as director of the United States Office of Personnel Management (OPM) from 2021 to 2024. She served as the chief of staff to the OPM director from 2015 to 2017. She assumed that position after serving for six years as the director of the White House Initiative on Asian Americans and Pacific Islanders. An Indian-born American, she has also been a lawyer with the United States Department of Justice and a founding director of a non-profit, the National Asian Pacific American Women's Forum. In 2017, she became the CEO of Philanthropy Northwest.

Ahuja's nomination was confirmed by the United States Senate on June 22, 2021, by a vote of 51–50, with Vice President Kamala Harris breaking the tie. She was sworn in on June 24, 2021.

== Early life and education ==
Ahuja was raised in Savannah, Georgia, and she and her family were Punjabi immigrants from India. She started college at Emory University, but quickly transferred to Spelman College and then went on to the University of Georgia School of Law, earning her Juris Doctor degree in 1998.

== Career ==
After school, she went to work for the Department of Justice. Ahuja later recalled that she found the pace of the DOJ to be too slow for her and left to create change through non-profit work.

Ahuja was the founding executive director of the National Asian Pacific American Women's Forum (NAPAWF). She worked there from 2003 to 2008, during which time she turned the NAPAWF from a volunteer organization, to one with paid staff.

Ahuja was appointed as the executive director of the White House Initiative on Asian Americans and Pacific Islanders (AAPI) on December 14, 2009. In this capacity, she has continued to work towards helping Asian Americans and Pacific Islanders (AAPI) access services from the United States federal government. Her work has included increasing health care for AAPI and also inter-agency cooperation between WAAPI and the Environmental Protection Agency to "address exposure to health toxins by nail salon workers," many of whom are Asian American. Other initiatives have been public to private, such as translating essential information about the Gulf Oil Spill for AAPI individuals still struggling with understanding English. Ahuja has also shared her own experiences, helping to "destigmatize depression and suicide when she opened up about her brother's suicide." Reappropriate stated that it was an important step towards ending "the stigma against mental illness among Asian Americans and Pacific Islanders.

On June 6, 2014, Kiran Ahuja, as the executive director of the White House Initiative on Asian Americans and Pacific Islanders, honored Yuri Kochiyama, on the White House website for dedicating "her life to the pursuit of social justice, not only for the Asian American and Pacific Islander (AAPI) community but all communities of color."

She is also a regular contributor to HuffPost.

=== Biden administration ===
In November 2020, Ahuja was named a member of the Joe Biden presidential transition Agency Review Team to support transition efforts related to the Office of Personnel Management. On February 23, 2021, President Biden nominated Ahuja to the position of OPM Director. She was confirmed to the position on June 22, 2021, by a Senate vote of 51–50, with Vice President Kamala Harris casting the tie-breaking vote. Republican senators were opposed to Ahuja's statement in June 2020 following the murder of George Floyd. Ahuja wrote, "You can’t be a true ally to Black communities until you take it upon yourself to understand our racialized history in its most intimate and heinous forms...and learn, as I did, that all forms of discrimination flow from the subjugation of Black and Indigenous people."

In April 2024, it was announced that Ahuja would step down due to health concerns and a death in her family.
