= Federal Investigative Services Division =

U.S. government agency

Federal Investigative Services (FIS) was a U.S. government agency within the United States Office of Personnel Management responsible for performing security clearance investigations. In January 2016 the Obama administration announced that the agency would be replaced with the new National Background Investigations Bureau following a series of intelligence failures and investigations conducted into USIS for contract fraud.

== See also ==
- USIS
- Department of the Navy Central Adjudication Facility
- Edward Snowden
- Blake Percival
