= Scott Kupor =

American business executive (born 1971)

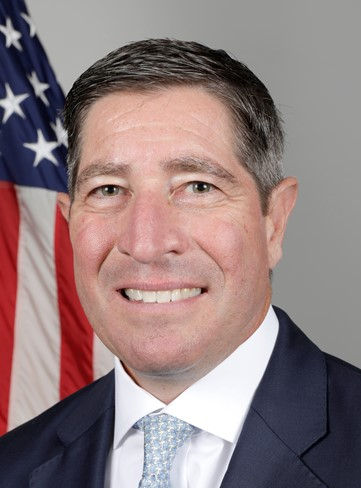
- Official portrait, 2025

Director of the United States Office of Personnel Management
- Incumbent
- Assumed office July 14, 2025
- President: Donald Trump
- Preceded by: Kiran Ahuja

Personal details
- Born: Scott Aaron Kupor; October 6, 1971 (age 54)
- Children: 3
- Education: Stanford University (BA, JD)

Scott Aaron Kupor (born October 6, 1971) is an American business executive and investment banker who has served as the director of the United States Office of Personnel Management since 2025.

Kupor graduated from Stanford University with a degree in public policy, and later its law school with a Juris Doctor in 1996. He worked at Credit Suisse as an investment banker managing initial public offerings. In 1999, Kupor began working for Loudcloud, a cloud computing firm co-founded by Marc Andreessen and Ben Horowitz. He remained with the company after it sold much of its business off and renamed itself to Opsware in 2002 and worked for Hewlett-Packard as an executive after it acquired Opsware in 2007. Kupor was the first employee hired by Andreessen and Horowitz's venture capital firm, Andreessen Horowitz. He served as the chair of the National Venture Capital Association from May 2017 to May 2018.

In December 2024, President-elect Donald Trump named Kupor as his nominee for director of the Office of Personnel Management. He appeared before the Senate Committee on Homeland Security and Governmental Affairs in April 2025. Kupor was confirmed by the Senate in July.

== Early life and education (1971–1996) ==
Scott Aaron Kupor was born on October 6, 1971. Kupor attended Welch Middle School and Bellaire High School in Houston, Texas. He graduated from Stanford University with a degree in public policy and from its law school with a Juris Doctor. At Stanford, he worked on behalf of the government of Japan at a policy institute and interned for Gail Wilensky, a health care policy advisor in the George H. W. Bush administration. In 1994, while at Stanford Law School, he sued the university over a provision in its student covenant prohibiting students from insulting others based on sex and race. Kupor graduated from law school in 1996. The following year, he married Laura, with whom he has three daughters.

== Career ==
=== Early work (1996–2009) ===
After graduating from Stanford Law School, Kupor clerked for United States Court of Appeals for the Fifth Circuit judge Jerry Edwin Smith for one year. By 1999, he had begun working for Credit Suisse as an investment banker managing initial public offerings. That year, he quit his job to work for Loudcloud, a cloud computing firm co-founded by Marc Andreessen and Ben Horowitz, after an executive at a company seeking an initial public offering told Kupor he was leaving to join Loudcloud. In 2002, Loudcloud sold much of its business off and renamed itself to Opsware. The company was acquired by Hewlett-Packard in 2007.

=== Andreessen Horowitz (2009–2025) ===
Kupor was the first employee hired at Andreessen Horowitz, a venture capital firm founded by Andreessen and Horowitz. In June 2010, Kupor was formally named as a partner at the firm. He additionally served as its chief operating officer. In preparation for his confirmation hearing as director of the Office of Personnel Management, Kupor resigned from Andreessen Horowitz and board positions on several of its portfolio companies, and divested from positions in other companies and funds, though he remained a passive investor in multiple funds. His position was largely replaced by former VMware chief executive Raghu Raghuram.

Kupor testified before the Senate Committee on Small Business and Entrepreneurship in July 2016 and the Senate Committee on Banking, Housing, and Urban Affairs on foreign investments in January 2018. In May 2017, he became the chair of the National Venture Capital Association. He continued to advocate for the association's proposed policies and lobbying. Kupor left his position the following year. He has additionally taught a class at Stanford University on venture capital and entrepreneurship.

== Director of the Office of Personnel Management (2025–present) ==
As Marc Andreessen and Ben Horowitz became politically active and publicly supportive of the Republican Party, including its presumptive nominee in that year's presidential election, Donald Trump, Kupor told Andreessen and Horowitz over Slack that if Trump won, he would consider taking a job in his administration. In September, they gave Kupor's name to Howard Lutnick, who was co-leading Trump's presidential transition. Kupor met with Lutnick, who offered him several jobs; prior to assuming the position, Kupor had not heard of the Office of Personnel Management. In December, The New York Times reported that Kupor had been considered as a potential nominee for administrator of the General Services Administration. He interviewed for a director role in the White House with Trump and his chief of staff, Susie Wiles, at Mar-a-Lago that month. On December 22, president Donald Trump named Kupor as his nominee for director of the Office of Personnel Management. Kupor appeared before the Senate Committee on Homeland Security and Governmental Affairs on April 3, 2025. He was questioned over his stance on federal mass layoffs; Kupor did not speak on the terminations, but stated that the "dignity and humanity" of federal workers should be respected. Kupor's nomination was among approximately three hundred being held by Hawaii senator Brian Schatz. The Senate voted to confirm Kupor on July 9.

In July 2025, after his swearing in, Kupor told reporters that he anticipated the Office of Personnel Management would lose a third of its employees by the end of the year. He issued guidance allowing federal workers to pray and discuss religion, including allowing for efforts to "persuade others of the correctness of their own religious views". Kupor moved to establish Schedule G appointments for policy-advocating or policy-making positions. Schedule G appointments can only be advanced with approval from the White House Presidential Personnel Office. He continued the Department of Government Efficiency initiative to take the Office of Personnel Management's paper-based retirement system online, though in August, Kupor ended the "five things" memorandums instituted by Elon Musk, who led the Department of Government Efficiency until his feud with Trump. As former Department of Government Efficiency employees sought permanent positions in the federal government, congressional Democrats requested information from Kupor on hiring; in a statement to CBS News, Kupor rejected claims that workers were being "unlawfully burrowed" into agencies. That month, he instructed agencies to delete COVID-19 vaccination information on employees.

Kupor's actions hearkened a significant shift in the operations of the Office of Personnel Management and represented the continued influence of Silicon Valley, particularly after the Trump–Musk feud. In an interview with Bloomberg News in August, he advocated for having all workers become at-will employees, eliminating college degree requirements for certain jobs, and investing pensions into a sovereign wealth fund. He supported the federal deferred resignation program and suggested that additional windows of resignation could be introduced. Kupor additionally stated his intention to bring young workers from Silicon Valley, though reserved that the government could not match the private sector in compensation. That month, he told The New York Times that the year would end with three hundred thousand fewer workers, the largest single-year decline in civilian federal employment since World War II. After being sworn in, Kupor started a blog on the Office of Personnel Management's website.

In September, Kupor ended a rule dating to the Grant administration that required civil service examiners to select from the highest three scorers on an exam for hiring. That month, he was sued by several labor unions for instructing federal workers to carry out mass layoffs amid an impending federal government shutdown, alongside Russell Vought, the director of the Office of Management and Budget. As the shutdown continued into November, Oklahoma senator James Lankford expressed concern to Kupor that the prolonged shutdown would threaten trust funds managed by the Office of Personnel Management. Kupor was sued by multiple labor unions in November for a merit-based hiring plan that the unions alleged was a loyalty test. In December, he coordinated with Vought on a centralized human resource management system. That month, Kupor announced the United States Tech Force, a federal hiring initiative aimed at bringing one thousand technology workers to work on artificial intelligence and modernization.

== Views ==
In an interview with Fortune in September 2025, Kupor described himself as a fiscal conservative with libertarian beliefs. In the first Trump administration, Kupor sought to orient the administration's immigration policy on skilled workers, rather than border security. In March 2018, he attended a Securities and Exchange Commission meeting on exempting cryptocurrency from federal regulations.

== Works cited ==
- "U.S. Senate Committee on Homeland Security and Governmental Affairs Opening Statement For the Nomination of Scott Kupor to be Director, Office of Personnel Management" (Document). United States Senate Committee on Homeland Security and Governmental Affairs. April 3, 2025.
