= Linda M. Springer =

American government official

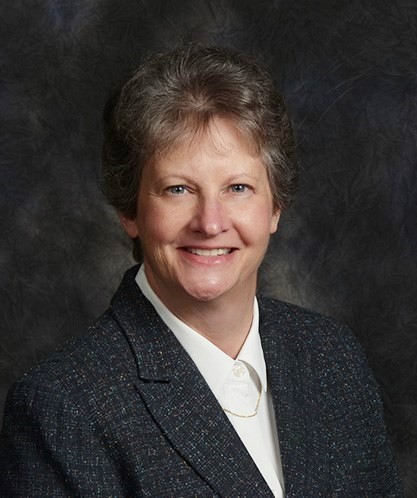

Director of the United States Office of Personnel Management
- In office June 28, 2005 – August 13, 2008
- President: George W. Bush
- Preceded by: Kay James
- Succeeded by: Michael Hager (acting)

Personal details
- Born: New Jersey, U.S.
- Party: Republican
- Education: Ursinus College (BS)

Linda M. Springer is a financial services executive who served as the eighth Director of the United States Office of Personnel Management. She was unanimously confirmed by the United States Senate in June 2005. Prior to her appointment, Springer served as controller and head of the Office of Federal Financial Management at the White House Office of Management and Budget. She previously worked for 25 years as an executive and actuary in the insurance and financial services industries.

== Education ==
Springer graduated in 1973 from Haddon Township High School and received her Bachelor of Science degree, cum laude, from Ursinus College which awarded her the 2006 Alumni Award. She attended the Executive Program in Managing the Enterprise at Columbia University Business School. Springer is a Fellow of the Society of Actuaries and a Member of the American Academy of Actuaries.

== Professional career ==
As Office of Personnel Management director, Springer was the chief executive of the organization responsible for the U.S. federal government's human resource planning, products, services and policies for the 1.8 million employee civilian workforce worldwide.

She was responsible for leading human capital planning and alignment; management of the world's largest single-employer sponsored health insurance program; policy guidance and compliance oversight to Federal agencies for recruiting, training, compensation and personnel management; administration of retirement plans for employees in all branches of the Federal government; and background investigative services for the civilian workforce.

During her tenure at the Office of Personnel Management, Springer implemented a strategic and operational goal setting and tracking process with goals and progress posted on the public website. She developed a recruiting program titled "Career Patterns" and a nationwide television advertising campaign for federal service careers. She oversaw product introductions for benefit programs, added healthcare provider cost and quality information for enrollees, and the executive office placed first of 222 federal agency subcomponents for leadership and strategic management.

As the Office of Management and Budget controller, Springer led the federal financial community to reduce agencies' year-end reporting time from five months to 45 days. She directed the modernization of government internal control responsibilities to implement relevant Sarbanes-Oxley type requirements for federal agencies. She also oversaw the issuance of the first comprehensive inventory of the federal government's improper payments.

From 2008 to 2015, Springer advised federal agencies as an executive director in the Government and Public Sector Practice of Ernst & Young LLP. She served as coordinating and engagement executive and technical advisor to cabinet departments and other agencies.

Springer served as senior advisor at the White House Office of Management and Budget from February through June 2017. She led the development of the foundation for a government-wide management agenda and the elimination of nearly five dozen obsolete and redundant management requirements.

In 2019, Springer provided technical support to the Subcommittee on Operations of the U.S. House of Representatives Committee on Oversight and Reform and testified at a public hearing in May 2019 on the future of the Office of Personnel Management.

Before her career in public service, Springer spent over twenty-five years in the financial services industry in executive roles responsible for financial and business line management, strategic and operational planning and actuarial services. She held positions of senior vice president and controller at Provident Mutual and Vice President and product manager at Penn Mutual Life Insurance Company.

Springer has been a frequent speaker and author on human capital and organizational management issues and was quoted by Business Week, U.S. News & World Report, National Journal, Human Resource Executive, Gallup Management Journal and other professional and industry journals. Her interviews and commentary were featured by television and radio stations around the country.

Springer established and owned a retail shop in Haddonfield, New Jersey, which was awarded a "Best of Philly" award from Philadelphia magazine. She is an accomplished cellist who performed for decades with the Haddonfield Symphony (since renamed as Symphony in C).

== Memberships and awards ==
Springer is a fellow and former director of The National Academy of Public Administration. She served as a member of the President's Commission on White House Fellowships, the President's Council on Integrity and Efficiency, the President's Management Council Executive Committee and was a Principal of the U.S. Joint Financial Management Improvement Program. She led the federal government councils for Chief Human Capital, Chief Financial and Federal Real Property Officers. Her leadership was recognized by being awarded the Secretary of Defense Medal for Outstanding Public Service. Springer's support for the veterans community was recognized in 2016 with the Blinded American Veterans Foundation George W. Alexander Memorial Volunteer Award. Springer was the recipient of the 2006 Ursinus College Alumni Award for Outstanding Professional Achievement.
