= Jeff Tien Han Pon =

American businessman and government official (born 1970)

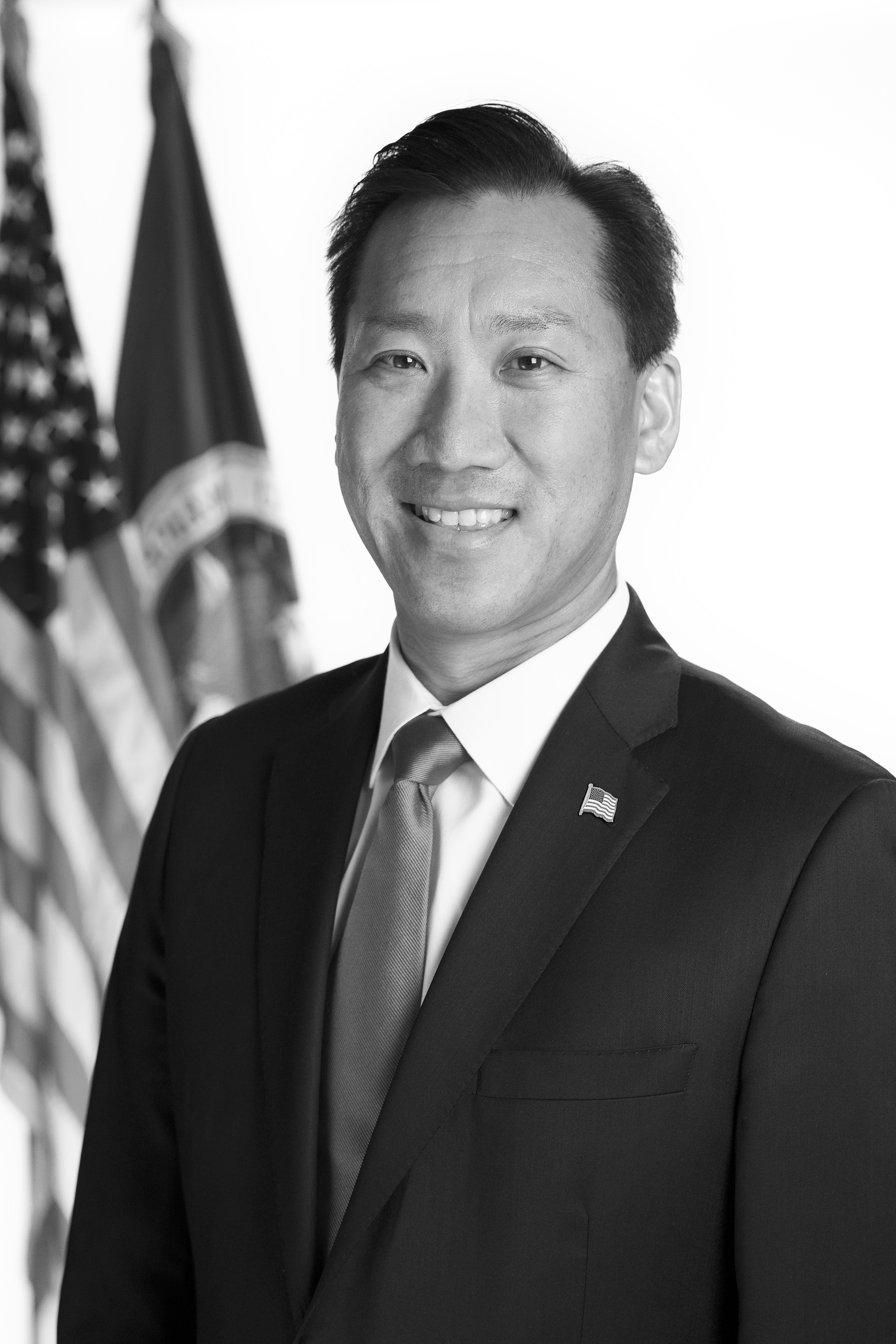

Director of the United States Office of Personnel Management
- In office March 9, 2018 – October 5, 2018
- President: Donald Trump
- Deputy: Michael Rigas
- Preceded by: Beth Cobert
- Succeeded by: Dale Cabaniss

Personal details
- Born: March 9, 1970 (age 56) San Francisco, California, United States
- Spouse: Gillian
- Children: 2
- Education: University of Southern California; California School of Professional Psychology

Jeff Tien Han Pon (born March 9, 1970) is an American human resources professional who is a former director of the United States Office of Personnel Management (OPM).

== Career ==
Pon previously served as chief human resources and strategy officer for the Society for Human Resource Management, a non-profit professional membership organization. He was also chief operating officer for Futures Inc., an organization that helps transitioning military members find civilian careers. Previously, he was a principal at Booz Allen Hamilton and served as the United States Department of Energy's chief human capital officer.

== Director of OPM ==
Pon was the deputy director of eGovernment at the U.S. Office of Personnel Management, where he helped to develop human resources shared services centers, payroll modernization, and the USAJobs website.

President Trump nominated Pon for the Director of OPM position. Pon's nomination to OPM was supported by the Senior Executives Association, a nonprofit that advocates for top federal government officials. Newsweek wrote that Pon "could be a key player in reforming" the federal bureaucracy and "in keeping the president's campaign pledge to 'drain the swamp.'" He was confirmed in March 2018.

Pon served in the position for seven months before being removed in October 2018. President Trump reportedly fired Pon because he resisted the administration's plan to dismantle the agency and farm out its functions to other departments, including the White House.
