= Beth Cobert =

American businesswoman and government official

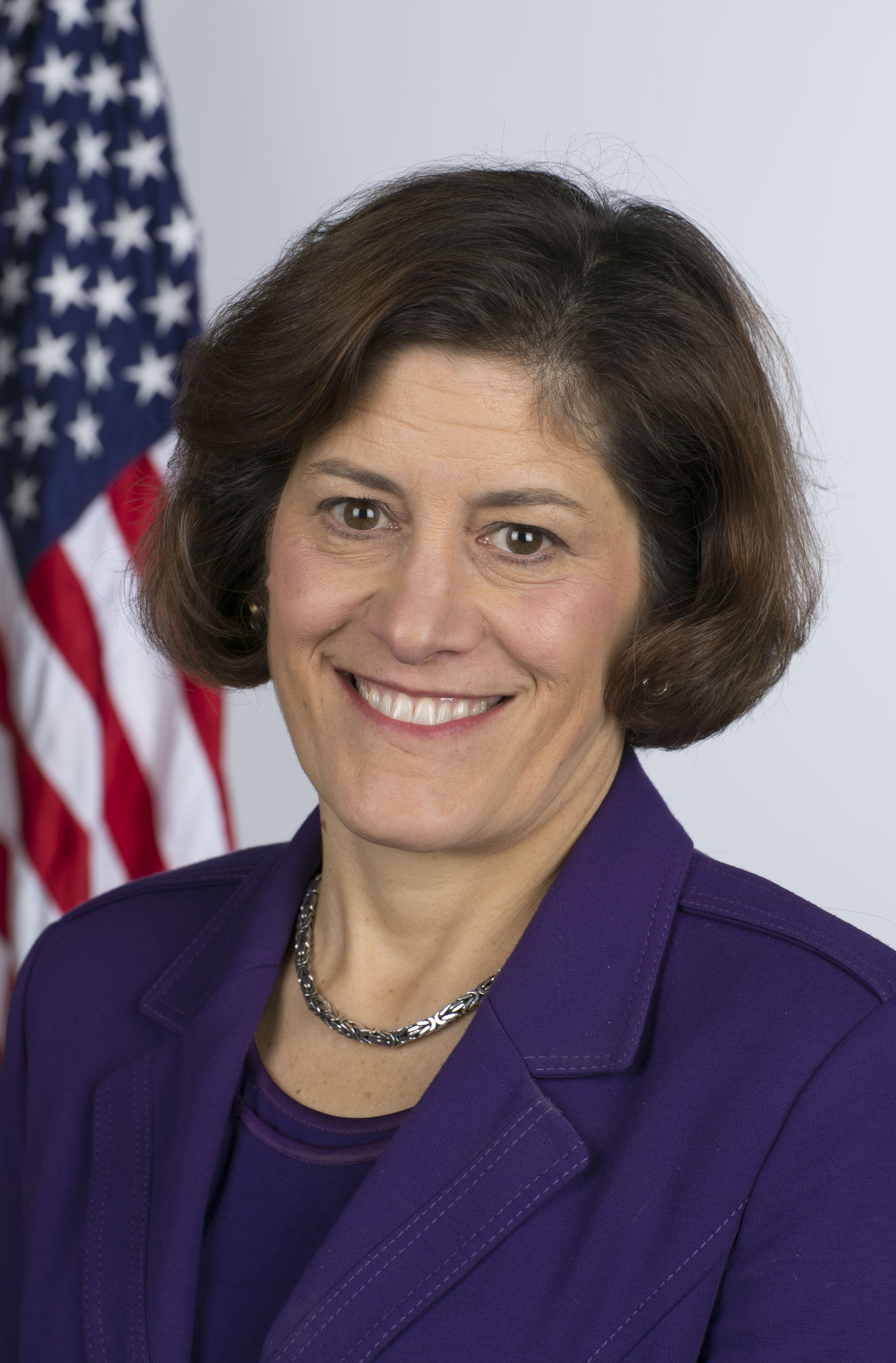

Director of the United States Office of Personnel Management
- Acting
- In office July 10, 2015 – January 20, 2017
- President: Barack Obama
- Preceded by: Katherine Archuleta
- Succeeded by: Jeff Tien Han Pon

2nd Chief Performance Officer of the United States
- In office October 16, 2013 – July 10, 2015
- President: Barack Obama
- Preceded by: Jeff Zients
- Succeeded by: Kathleen McGettigan (acting)

Personal details
- Spouse: Adam Cioth (m. 1987)
- Education: Princeton University (BA); Stanford University (MBA)

Beth Frances Cobert is an American businesswoman and has been a government official. She served as the acting Director for the United States Office of Personnel Management (OPM) from July 10, 2015 to January 20, 2017. As of March 2021, she is Chief Operating Officer of the Markle Foundation and Chief Executive Officer of Skillful, an initiative of that foundation.

== Education ==
Cobert graduated with an A.B. in economics from Princeton University in 1980 after completing an 117-page long senior thesis titled "An International Monetary Fund Substitution Account: The Proposal and Its Prospects." She then received an M.B.A. from Stanford University.

== Career ==
Cobert previously served nearly 30 years at McKinsey & Company as a director and senior partner. During her tenure, she worked with corporate, not-for-profit and government entities on key strategic, operational and organizational issues across a range of sectors, including financial services, healthcare, legal services, real estate, telecommunications, and philanthropy. She led major projects to generate performance improvements through process streamlining, enhanced customer service, improved deployment of technology, more effective marketing programs and strengthened organizational effectiveness. Within McKinsey, Cobert held multiple leadership roles in people management including recruiting, training, development and performance management of staff.

Cobert also previously served as a board member and chair of the United Way of the Bay Area, and as a member of the Stanford Graduate School of Business Advisory Council.

Cobert served as acting OPM director from July 20, 2015. On November 10, 2015 Barack Obama nominated Cobert to be the OPM Director, but she was not confirmed by the Senate. She continued to be acting director until the inauguration of President Donald Trump on January 20, 2017, and was succeeded by Kathleen McGettigan.

Cobert was elected to a four-year term as a member of the Board of Trustees of Princeton University in 2017.

In 2017, Cobert was elected as a Fellow of National Academy of Public Administration.

== Personal life ==
She and her husband, Adam Cioth, have two children.
