= Sensitive compartmented information =

Information relative to U.S. National Security

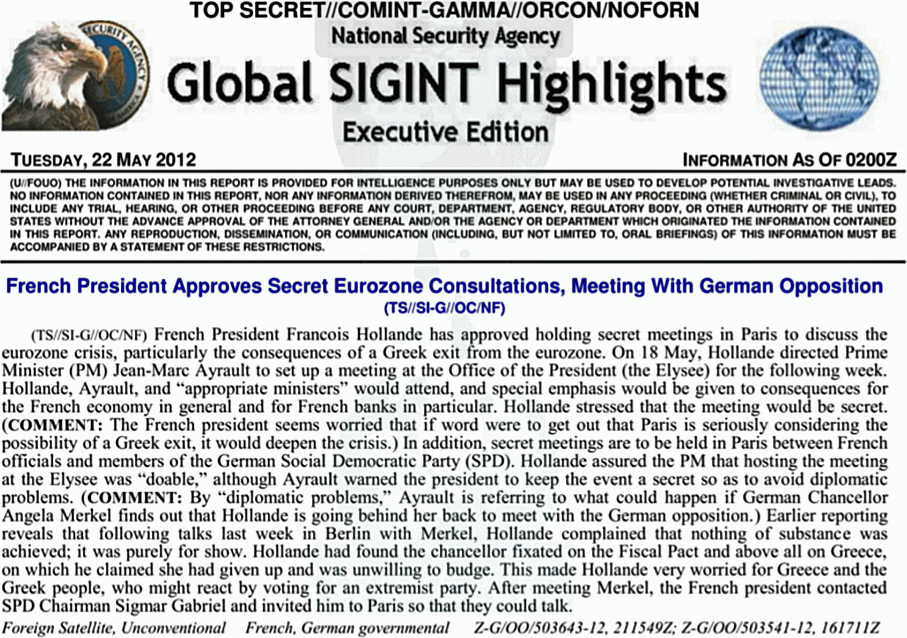
Example of intelligence on covert meetings held by the French president François Hollande. The intelligence was collected by the National Security Agency and classified as TOP SECRET//COMINT-GAMMA//ORCON/NOFORN, and released in form of a Global SIGINT Highlight on 22 May 2012.

Sensitive compartmented information (SCI) is a type of United States classified information concerning or derived from sensitive intelligence sources, methods, or analytical processes. All SCI must be handled within formal access control systems established by the director of national intelligence.

SCI is not a classification; SCI clearance has sometimes been incorrectly called "above Top Secret", but information at any classification level may exist within an SCI control system. When "decompartmentalized", this information is treated the same as collateral information at the same classification level.

The federal government requires the SCI be processed, stored, used or discussed in a sensitive compartmented information facility (SCIF).

== Access ==
Eligibility for access to SCI is determined by a Single Scope Background Investigation (SSBI) or periodic reinvestigation. Because the same investigation is used to grant Top Secret security clearances, the two are often written together as TS/SCI. Eligibility alone does not confer access to any specific SCI material; it is simply a qualification. One must receive explicit permission to access an SCI control system or compartment. This process may include a polygraph or other approved investigative or adjudicative action.

Once it is determined a person should have access to an SCI compartment, they sign a nondisclosure agreement, are "read in" or indoctrinated, and the fact of this access is recorded in a local access register or in a computer database. Upon termination from a particular compartment, the employee again signs the nondisclosure agreement.

== Control systems ==
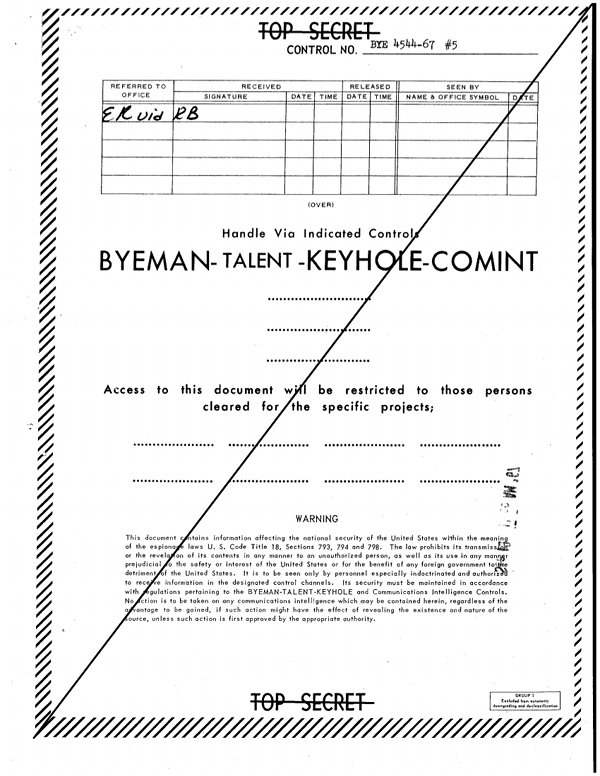
An SCI cover sheet from 1967

SCI is divided into control systems, which are further subdivided into compartments and sub-compartments. These systems and compartments are usually identified by a classified codeword. Several such codewords have been declassified. The following SCI control systems, with their abbreviations and compartments, are known:

Special Intelligence (SI)
Special Intelligence (so in the CAPCO manual, but always SI in document markings) is the control system covering communications intelligence. Special Intelligence is a term for communications intercepts. The previous title for this control system was COMINT, but this was deprecated in 2011.
SI has several compartments, of which the following are known or declassified:
- Very Restricted Knowledge (VRK)
- Exceptionally Controlled Information (ECI), which was used to group compartments for highly sensitive information, but was deprecated as of 2011.
- SI-GAMMA (SI-G, SI-G-AAAA, AAAA represents 4 alpha characters to indicate sub Gamma compartments), which has subcompartments identified by four alphanumeric characters.
SI-NK and SI-EU are also possible as in under ENDSEAL.
Several now-retired codewords protected SI compartments based on their sensitivity, generally referred to as Top Secret Codeword (TSC) and Secret Codeword (SC). These codewords were:
- UMBRA for the most sensitive material
- SPOKE for less sensitive material
- MORAY for the least sensitive SI that required codeword protection.
These three codewords, the usage of which was terminated in 1999, were attached directly to the classification without reference to COMINT or SI, e.g. Top Secret UMBRA.
STELLARWIND (STLW)
This codeword was revealed on June 27, 2013, when The Guardian published a draft report from the NSA Inspector General about the electronic surveillance program STELLARWIND. This program was started by President George W. Bush shortly after the 9/11 attacks. For information about this program, a new security compartment was created which was given STELLARWIND as its permanent cover term on October 31, 2001.
ENDSEAL (EL)
This U.S. Navy's control system was revealed in the 2013 Classification Manual. ENDSEAL information must always be classified as Special Intelligence (SI), so probably it is related to SIGINT or ELINT. It has two subcompartments: ECRU (SI-EU) and NONBOOK (SI-NK).
TALENT KEYHOLE (TK)
TK covers space-based IMINT (imagery intelligence), SIGINT (signals intelligence), and MASINT (measurement and signature intelligence) collection platforms; related processing and analysis techniques; and research, design, and operation of these platforms (but see Reserve below). The original TALENT compartment was created in the mid-1950s for the U-2. In 1960, it was broadened to cover all national aerial reconnaissance (to later include SR-71 sourced imagery) and the KEYHOLE compartment was created for satellite intelligence. TALENT KEYHOLE is now a top-level control system that merged with KLONDIKE; KEYHOLE is no longer a distinct compartment. Known compartments include RUFF (IMINT satellites), ZARF (ELINT satellites), and CHESS (U-2). The KEYHOLE series KH-1 through KH-4b were part of the new TALENT-KEYHOLE designation. RSEN (Risk Sensitive Notice, portion marking RS) keyword is used for imagery product.
HUMINT Control System (HCS)
HCS is the HUMINT (human-source intelligence) Control System. This system was simply designated "HUMINT" until confusion arose between collateral (regular) HUMINT and the control system. The current nomenclature was chosen to eliminate the ambiguity. There are two compartments HCS-O (Operation) and HCS-P (Product). HCS-O-P marking was also used in "Review of the Unauthorized Disclosures of Former National Security Agency Contractor Edward Snowden".
KLONDIKE (KDK)
KLONDIKE is a legacy system that protected sensitive geospatial intelligence. It had three main subcompartments: KDK BLUEFISH (KDK-BLFH, KDK-BLFH-xxxxxx, xxxxxx represents up to 6 alphanumeric characters indicating a sub BLUEFISH compartment), KDK IDITAROD (KDK-IDIT, KDK-IDIT-xxxxxx, xxxxxx represents up to 6 alphanumeric characters indicating a sub IDITAROD compartment) and KDK KANDIK (KDK-KAND, KDK-KAND-xxxxxx, xxxxxx represents up to 6 alphanumeric characters indicating a sub KANDIK compartment). Nowadays it exists under TALENT KEYHOLE (TK-BLFH, TK-IDIT, TK-KAND).
RESERVE (RSV)
RESERVE is the control system for National Reconnaissance Office compartments protecting new sources and methods during the research, development, and acquisition process. RSV-XXX, XXX represents 3 alphanumeric characters to indicate sub Reserve compartments.
BYEMAN (BYE)
BYEMAN is a retired control system covering certain overhead collection systems, including CORONA and OXCART. Most BYE content was transferred to TK. BYE Special Handling content was transferred to Reserve.

== Markings ==
SCI control system markings are placed immediately after the classification level markings in a banner line (banner spells out TOP SECRET in full) or portion marking (here TS is used). Sometimes, especially on older documents, they are stamped. The following banner line and portion marking describe a top secret document containing information from the notional SI-GAMMA 1234 subcompartment, the notional SI-MANSION compartment, and the notional TALENT KEYHOLE-BLUEFISH compartment (TK is always abbreviated, because in some cases even the full meaning may be classified, like for BUR keyword, BUR-BLG-HCAS, BUR-BLG-JETS):

TOP SECRET//SI-G 1234-M/TK-BLFH//NOFORN
(TS//SI-G 1234-M/TK-BLFH//NF)

Older documents were marked with HANDLE VIA xxxx CONTROL CHANNELS (or "HVxCC"), HANDLE VIA xxxx CHANNELS ONLY (or "HVxCO"), or HANDLE VIA xxxx CHANNELS JOINTLY (or "HVxCJ"), but this requirement was rescinded in 2006. For example, COMINT documents were marked as HANDLE VIA COMINT CHANNELS ONLY. This marking led to the use of the caveat CCO (COMINT Channels Only) in portion markings, but CCO is also obsolete.

== Bibliography ==
- Explanation of the US Classification System
- Critique of the Codeword Compartment in the CIA, March 1977
- DCID 3/29, Controlled Access Program Oversight Committee, 2 June 1995
- ICD 1, Policy Directive for Intelligence Community Leadership, 1 May 2006
- ICD 705, Sensitive Compartmented Information Facilities, 26 May 2010
- ICPG 704.1, Personnel Security Investigative Standards and Procedures Governing Eligibility for Access to Sensitive Compartmented Information and Other Controlled Access Program Information, 2 October 2008
- Intelligence Community Authorized Classification and Control Markings Register and Manual v5.1, 30 March 2012
- National Reconnaissance Office Review and Redaction Guide For Automatic Declassification Of 25-Year-Old Information, 2008
- Richelson, Jeffrey. The US Intelligence Community. Boulder, CO: Westview Press. 2008.
- UKUSA COMINT Agreement and Appendices Thereto, 1951–1953
