= Single Scope Background Investigation =

Type of US security clearance check

A Single Scope Background Investigation (SSBI), now called a Tier 5 (T5) investigation, is a type of United States security clearance investigation. It involves investigators or agents interviewing past employers, coworkers and other individuals associated with the subject of the SSBI. It is governed by the U.S. Intelligence Community Policy Guidance Number 704.1.

The Tier 5 investigation is required in order to receive a Top Secret (TS) or Q clearance. It is required for positions designated as High Risk. A TS/SCI clearance for sensitive compartmented information requires a Tier 5+ investigation, and additionally requires re-investigation every 7 years.

Standard elements include background checks of employment, education, organization affiliations and any local agency where the subject has lived, worked, traveled or attended school. These checks lead to interviews with persons who know the subject both personally and professionally. The investigation may include a National Agency Check with Local Agency Check and Credit Check (NACLC) of the subject's spouse or cohabitant. Previous background investigations conducted on the subject may also be reviewed to corroborate the information obtained or disclosed within the new SSBI.

The Standard Form 86 (SF86) is required to begin the background check process.

== See also ==
- Yankee White
