= Defense Counterintelligence and Security Agency =

Agency in the U.S. Department of Defense

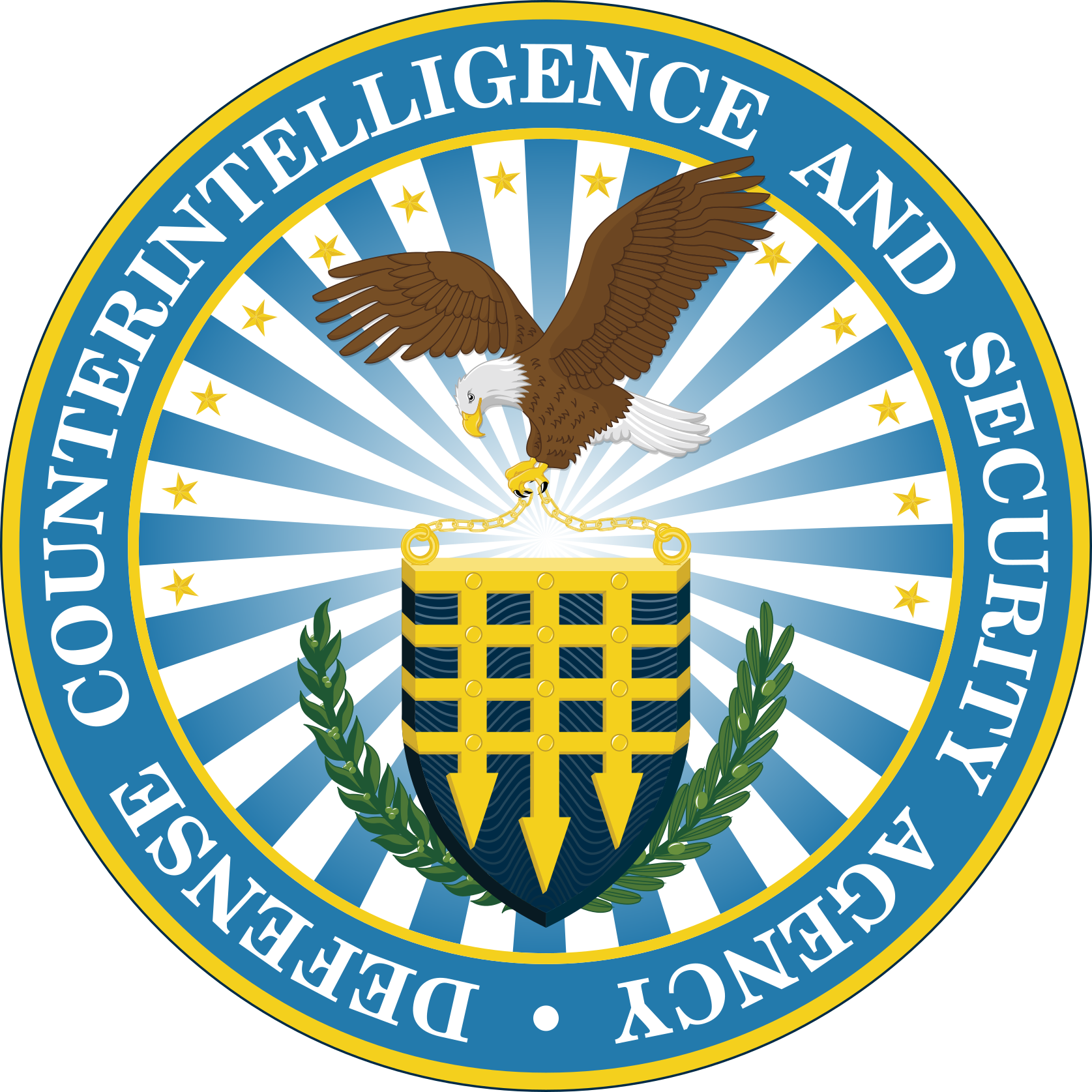
- Seal of the Defense Counterintelligence and Security Agency

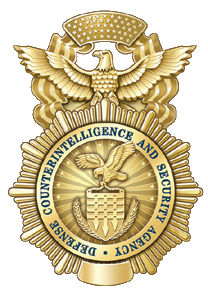
- Special agent's badge of the Defense Counterintelligence and Security Agency

Agency overview
- Formed: 30 September 2019; 6 years ago
- Preceding agencies: Defense Investigative Service (DIS) (1972–1999); Defense Security Service (DSS) (1999–2019)
- Type: Security Agency
- Jurisdiction: United States
- Headquarters: Marine Corps Base Quantico, Virginia, U.S.
- Agency executive: Justin Overbaugh, Acting Director
- Parent department: United States Department of Defense
- Website: www.dcsa.mil

The Defense Counterintelligence and Security Agency (DCSA) is a federal security and defense agency of the United States Department of Defense (DoD) that reports to the under secretary of defense for intelligence. DCSA is the largest counterintelligence and security agency in the federal government and is responsible for providing personnel vetting, critical technology protection, counterintelligence, training, and education and certification. DCSA services over 100 federal entities, oversees 10,000 cleared companies, and conducts approximately 2 million background investigations each year. DCSA collaborates with international counterparts on matters pertaining to military-specific counterintelligence and security matters.

== Background ==
The agency was originally established as the Defense Investigative Service and was created on January 1, 1972. In 1999, the agency changed its name to the Defense Security Service. In July 2019, DSS was reorganized as DCSA, in conjunction with the transfer of responsibility for conducting background investigations from the National Background Investigations Bureau at the United States Office of Personnel Management.

== Responsibility ==
DCSA conducts personnel security investigations for 95% of the federal government, supervises industrial security, provides counterintelligence support to the cleared defense industrial base, and performs security education and training. DCSA also provides the uniformed US military services, Department of Defense agencies, 35 federal agencies, and approximately 10,000 cleared government contractor facilities with security support services. The Director of DCSA reports to the Under Secretary of Defense for Intelligence.

== National Industrial Security Program (NISP) ==
DCSA administers the NISP on behalf of the Department of Defense and 35 other federal agencies. DCSA provides oversight to approximately 10,000 cleared contract companies to ensure they are adequately protecting facilities, personnel, and associated Information Technology systems from attacks and vulnerabilities.

== Organization ==
DCSA is organized into five directorates, each of which are led by a mission director and contain various subcomponents.

- Personnel Security
  - Consolidated Adjudication Services (CAS)
- Industrial Security
  - National Access Elsewhere Security Oversight Center (NAESOC)
  - NISP Authorization Office (NAO)
- Security Training
  - Center for Development of Security Excellence (CDSE)
  - The National Center for Credibility Assessment (NCCA)
- Counterintelligence & Insider Threat
  - DoD Insider Threat Management and Analysis Center (DITMAC)
- Field Operations
  - Western Region
  - Central Region
  - Eastern Region
  - Mid-Atlantic Region

== Personnel ==
DCSA Industrial Security Representatives, Counterintelligence Agents, Background Investigators, and Information System Security Professionals are credentialed Special Agents. DCSA also uses a number of contract investigators and staff to help support DCSA's various missions.

== Locations ==
The DCSA headquarters is located on Marine Corps Base Quantico. DCSA also has 167 field offices across the United States.

== See also ==
US military investigative organizations

- Air Force Office of Special Investigations (AFOSI)
- Coast Guard Investigative Service (CGIS)
- Defense Criminal Investigative Service (DCIS)
- Naval Criminal Investigative Service (NCIS)
- United States Army Counterintelligence (ACI)
- United States Army Criminal Investigation Command (USACIDC or CID)
- United States Marine Corps Criminal Investigation Division (USMCCID or CID)
