= President's Management Agenda =

Policy initiative by United States president George W. Bush

The President's Management Agenda (PMA) is an initiative, announced by U.S. President George W. Bush in 2001, to make the U.S. federal government more efficient and effective. In its drive to make government more "citizen-centered, market-based, and results-oriented," the agenda emphasizes regular performance reviews for departments, increased managerial flexibility, and greater accountability for employees, in all cases drawing on techniques and models popular in the private sector. Reviews examine five areas: human capital, financial accountability, competitive sourcing, e-government, and budget and performance integration. Agencies and Departments are scored each quarter by the Office of Management and Budget (OMB) (and by the Office of Personnel Management (OPM) for human capital). As with the balanced scorecard management approach popular in the private sector, scoring is on red-yellow-green stoplight. Scores are given for "progress" and "status". Details and scores are maintained on a public website, performance.gov, maintained by OMB (it is unclear if updates under present President Trump are being made).
