= Combined Federal Campaign =

Non-profit organization donation system for U.S. government employees

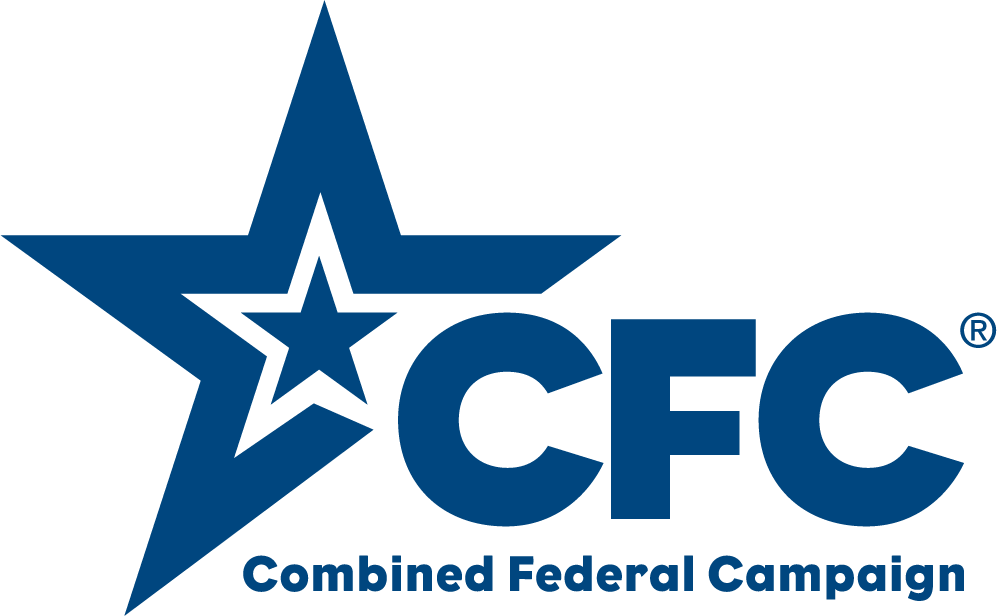
- Purpose: workplace giving program
- Affiliations: United States Office of Personnel Management
- Website: opm.gov/cfc

The Combined Federal Campaign (CFC) is the workplace giving program of the federal government of the United States. The program is authorized by executive order 12353 (as amended) of March 23, 1982, and is overseen by the United States Office of Personnel Management (OPM). Issued by President Reagan, the order states that a CFC objective is "to lessen the burdens of government and of local communities in meeting needs of human health and welfare ..." According to OPM's website, the mission of the CFC "is to promote and support philanthropy through a program that is employee focused, cost-efficient, and effective in providing all federal employees the opportunity to improve the quality of life for all".

The federal regulations that govern the CFC are at 5 CFR §950.

== Origins ==
In 1957, President Dwight D. Eisenhower promulgated procedures for a program of charitable solicitation in the federal workplace and established the "President's Committee on Fund-Raising Within the Federal Service" to review and modify the fund-raising program (Executive Order No. 10728, 22 Fed. Reg. 7219, Establishing the President's Committee on Fund-Raising Within the Federal Service, Sept. 6, 1957).

In 1961, President John F. Kennedy signed Executive Order 10927, "Abolishing the President's Committee on Fund-Raising Within the Federal Service and Providing for the Conduct of Fund-Raising Activities," which gave authority to the United States Civil Service Commission to organize nonprofit solicitations of federal government employees:

... The Chairman of the Civil Service Commission is authorized to consult with appropriate interested persons and organizations, the national voluntary agencies, and the executive departments and agencies concerned. Such arrangements shall (1) permit true voluntary giving and reserve to the individual the option of disclosing his gift or keeping it confidential; (2) designate specific periods during which solicitations may be conducted; and (3) provide for not more than three solicitations annually, except in cases of emergency or disaster appeals for which specific provision may be made by the Chairman of the Civil Service Commission.

— John F. Kennedy, Executive Order 10927

Former logo for the Combined Federal Campaign (CFC)

Kennedy's executive order was eventually replaced by President Ronald Reagan's 1982 executive order 12353, "Charitable Fundraising," which created the modern Combined Federal Campaign under the United States Office of Personnel Management.

== Organization ==
The CFC consists of a number of local committees and a central Office of the CFC. The overall program is overseen by the Office of Personnel Management.

Before 2014, administration was very decentralized. While collecting contributions via payroll deduction was centralized, most of the publicity and distribution of funds was the responsibility of the local committees. Circa 2014, there were 163 such committees. Most of those committees relied on local United Way charities to perform the actual work. In 2014, OPM issued rules to centralize administration of the CFC. OPM argued centralized administration would reduce expenses and eliminate redundant, paper-heavy functions. The first campaign under the new structure took place in 2017. The new structure gave a single charity responsibility for distributing contributions. A reduced number of regional CFC committees were responsible for promoting the campaign. In 2020, there were 36 such CFC zones.

In 2015, OPM awarded a contract to administer the CFC to The Give Back Foundation, a charity based in Madison, Wisconsin. The Give Back Foundation subcontracted to Total Administrative Service Corporation (TASC), a for-profit corporation that runs the day-to-day operations of the CFC. OPM renewed the contract in 2021.

=== Administrative costs ===
The CFC spends a portion of contributions on administrative costs. The 2014 rule changes included charging each charity an annual application fee, and if the application was approved, an additional listing fee. Although OPM intended these new fees to cover the entire cost, it continued to need to deduct money from contributions to meet administrative expenses.

According to the OPM, historically, campaign costs have averaged ten percent. However, costs increased and contributions decreased in the period when administration was centralized. Administrative costs for the 2017 campaign were 25%. In 2019, the CFC continued to charge application fees, listing fees, and distribution fees. The distribution fees that year were 19% of pledges. (Note: Changes in reporting complicate comparing costs from year to year. Distribution fees are not the same as total cost, and pledges are not the same as contributions.)

In 2025, administrative costs were about 33% of donations.

In 2025 the Trump administration paused the start of the campaign while weighing ending it completely. The campaign eventually went forward, and after several changes were made to reduce administrative costs, continued in 2026. OPM said it would "continue evaluating whether the program remains viable for subsequent years."

== Participation ==
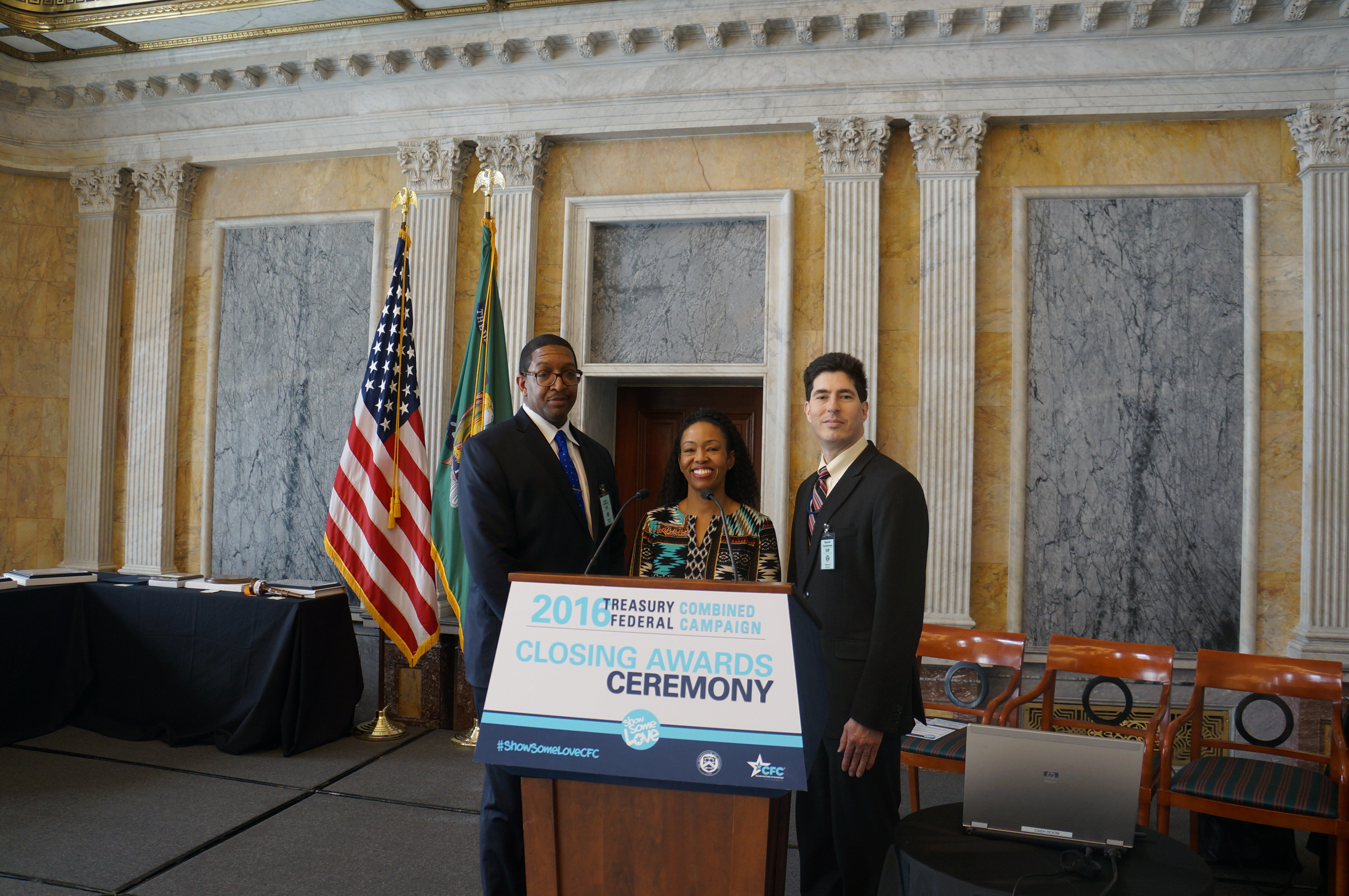
At the Main Treasury Building, in the Cash Room, a CFC award ceremony

Contributions to the CFC totaled $12.9 million in 1964, $82.8 million in 1979, and peaked at $282.6 million in 2009. In 2011, CFC pledges totaled $272.7 million with 24% of the federal workforce participating and an average employee pledge of $284.27. In 2012, OPM began the process restructuring the CFC, by establishing the CFC-50 commission, followed by draft rules in 2013. The vast majority of CFC stakeholders that submitted comments in the public comment period opposed key aspects of the proposed rules. The CFC donations began to decline in this period. In the last year of the historical structure with charities operating the CFC, 2016, donations to the CFC totaled $167 million with employee participation at 10.7 percent. Under the first year of OPM's new centralized structure, donations dropped 39% to $101 million and employee participation dropped to 4.3%.

For a few years before 2025, donations were around $65 -70 million per year.

The number of participating charities was estimated in 2012 at more than 20,000 nonprofit organizations worldwide. Organizations wishing to participate must submit a new charity application annually. Beginning in 2017, OPM began charging charities upfront fees in order to participate in the CFC. Application and listing fees were tiered based on the size and nature of the charity. Application fees collected from charities totaled $3,498,745 and listing fees totaled $5,766,385. 8,573 charities opted to pay the upfront fees and participate in the CFC. After the 2017 CFC campaign concluded, OPM announced that, pursuant to provisions in the new rules, a 16.5% distribution fee (totaling $16,772,233) would be charged on donations to cover the cost of the CFC. Early reports are that the number of charities participating in 2018 will drop by approximately 9%

== Screening of Charities ==
The CFC requires participating charities to meet certain requirements. From time to time, the CFC has been criticized both for requirements both too restrictive and too lenient.

=== Terrorist screening controversy ===
In 2004, the program added a new requirement that all organizations participating in the CFC must certify that they screen all of their employees against government-created blacklists, intended to identify people involved in "terrorist activities". This resulted in the American Civil Liberties Union (ACLU) resigning from the CFC July 31, 2004, because such checks violate their principles. In November 2004, the ACLU and 12 other non-profit organizations filed a lawsuit challenging this policy. Since then, in November 2005, the OCFCO has put out revised requirements. The new regulation requires that each federation, federation member, and un-affiliated organization applying for participation in the CFC must, as a condition of participation, complete a certification that it is in compliance with all statutes, Executive orders, and regulations restricting or prohibiting U.S. persons from engaging in transactions and dealings with countries, entities, or individuals subject to economic sanctions administered by the U.S. Department of the Treasury's Office of Foreign Assets Control (OFAC). In essence, the charities have to certify that the organizations that they support are not considered terrorist organizations by the US Government. While the ACLU was not in the CFC for 2005, these revised requirements seem to have satisfied most of the charities who complained. In 2007, the ACLU returned to the CFC.

=== Charities failing to pay taxes ===
In 2006, Federal regulators released a report finding the CFC had allowed charities to participate despite being behind on payroll taxes or otherwise engaging in illegal activities. The CFC said a federal law prevented it from screening charities for tax compliance, however in 2006 it said it was taking steps to assure participating charities actually were recognized by the IRS as tax exempt.

=== Charities with high overhead costs ===
Prior to 2006, the CFC restricted charities with fundraising and other overhead costs exceeding 25% of revenue. It did not prohibit such charities from participating, but required them to explain those costs. Starting in 2006, it dropped this screening, citing burden administering the rule, as well as lawsuits from charities affected by the rule.
