= Standard Form 86 =

United States government form

The SF 86

Standard Form 86 (SF 86) is a United States government questionnaire used to collect information for the purpose of "conducting background investigations, reinvestigations, and continuous evaluations of persons under consideration for, or retention of, national security positions".

SF 86 is distinguished from SF 85, which is used for public trust or lower-risk positions. The form is required to be completed by military personnel, government contractors, and government employees in order to receive a requisite security clearance. Information demanded in the form include any colleges or universities attended over the past three years, an account of the last ten years of the individual's employment, ties to foreign nationals and governments, overseas travel, a list of past residences, etc.

An online interface for completing the SF-86 is e-QIP, or the Electronic Questionnaires for Investigations Processing.

== See also ==
- Single Scope Background Investigation
- Standard Form 312
