= United States Office of Personnel Management =

United States federal government agency

- Official seal

- Official wordmark

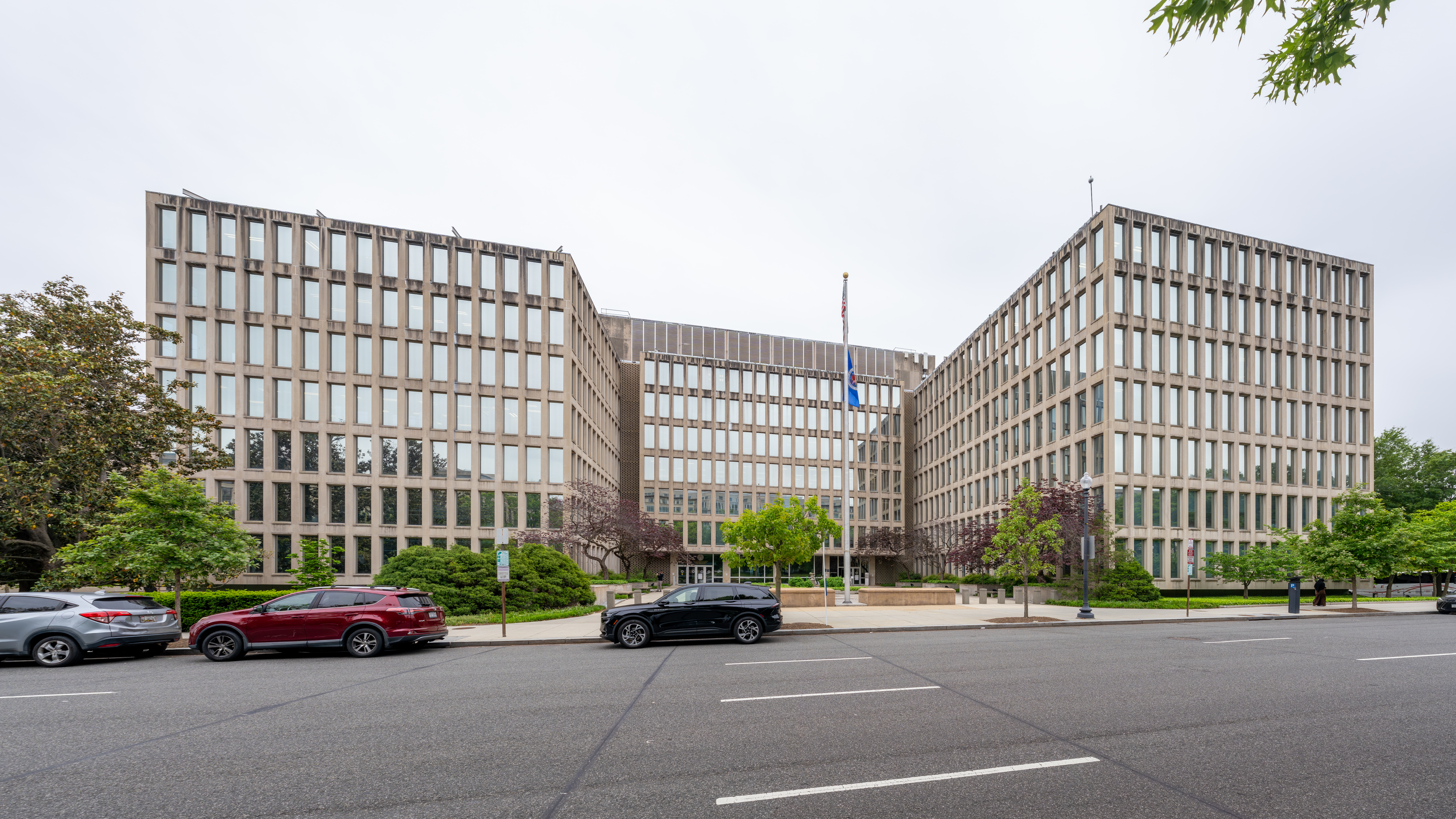
- Theodore Roosevelt Federal Building (2026)

Agency overview
- Formed: January 1, 1979; 47 years ago
- Preceding agency: Civil Service Commission
- Jurisdiction: United States federal government
- Headquarters: Theodore Roosevelt Federal Building 1900 E Street, NW Washington, D.C., US
- Employees: 2,448 (2021)
- Annual budget: $329,755,000 (2021)
- Agency executive: Scott Kupor, Director
- Website: opm.gov

The United States Office of Personnel Management (OPM) is an independent agency of the federal government of the United States that manages the United States federal civil service. The agency provides federal human resources policy, oversight, and support, and tends to healthcare (FEHB), life insurance (FEGLI), and retirement benefits (CSRS and FERS, but not TSP) for federal government employees, retirees, and their dependents.

OPM is headed by a director, who is nominated by the president and confirmed by the Senate. As of July 14, 2025, Scott Kupor is the director.

== History ==
The Pendleton Civil Service Reform Act of 1883 created OPM's predecessor, the United States Civil Service Commission. On January 1, 1979, the Civil Service Reform Act of 1978 and Reorganization Plan No. 2 of 1978 took effect, dissolving the commission and assigning most of its former functions—except the federal employees appellate function—to new agencies, with most assigned to the newly created U.S. Office of Personnel Management (OPM) and Merit Systems Protection Board (MSPB) (43 FR 36037, 92 Stat. 3783).

The United States Office of Government Ethics, responsible for directing executive branch policies relating to the prevention of conflicts of interest on the part of federal executive branch officers and employees, was part of OPM until being spun off as an independent agency in 1989.

In 1996, OPM's investigation branch was privatized, and USIS was formed. In 2014, after several scandals, OPM declined to renew its contract with USIS and brought background investigations back in house under the short-lived National Background Investigations Bureau. In 2019, responsibility for conducting federal background checks changed hands again when NBIB was dissolved and its functions were given to the Defense Security Service, part of the Department of Defense, which was reorganized into the Defense Counterintelligence and Security Agency for the purpose.

=== Obama-era reform efforts ===
In July 2013, Representative Blake Farenthold introduced the Office of Personnel Management Inspector General Act. The bill would increase oversight of OPM's revolving fund. Farenthold introduced the bill as a response to accusations of fraud and concern about security clearance background investigations. The bill would fund the expenses for investigations, oversight activities, and audits from the revolving fund. The bill was in response to a discovery that between 2002 and 2012, OPM's revolving fund had tripled, totaling over $2 billion, or 90% of OPM's budget. In February 2014, President Barack Obama signed the bill into law. The fund's history dates to the early 1980s, where it was used for two main activities: training and background investigations for government personnel.

=== 2015 data breach ===
In April 2015, hackers working on behalf of the Jiangsu State Security Department, a provincial branch of the Chinese Ministry of State Security, obtained access to 22.1 million SF-86 records of U.S. federal employees, contractors, and their friends and family. In one of the largest breaches of government data in U.S. history, information that was obtained and exfiltrated in the breach included personally identifiable information such as Social Security numbers, names, dates and places of birth, and addresses.

New information about this security breach came to light on September 24, 2015. The agency then indicated that additional evidence showed that 5.6 million people's fingerprints were stolen as part of the hacks, more than five times the 1.1 million originally estimated. The total number of people whose records were disclosed in whole or part, including Social Security numbers and addresses, remained at 21.5 million.

=== First Trump administration proposal to merge into GSA ===
Between 2018 and 2019, as part of a larger initiative to restructure the executive branch, President Donald Trump submitted a proposal to congress to merge OPM into the General Services Administration (GSA) while returning the federal personnel policy-making components under the direct authority of the Executive Office of the President of the United States to the Office of Management and Budget in the White House. Representative Gerry Connolly, chair of the Subcommittee on Government Operations under the House Committee on Oversight and Reform, fiercely criticized the proposal. During a congressional hearing, Connolly said: "The administration wants to take over the merit policy-making functions and put them into the highly politicized environment of the White House itself, away from direct congressional oversight and inspector general review." Political pressure against the proposal peaked when a provision barring the president from transferring any function, responsibility, authority, service, system, or program until six months after the completion of an "independent report" by the federally chartered National Academy of Public Administration was added to the 1,120 page bill S-1790, the National Defense Authorization Act for Fiscal Year 2020.

=== Second Trump administration workforce restructuring and security concerns ===
To reduce the federal workforce, Trump established the Department of Government Efficiency (DOGE) on January 20, 2025, and appointed Elon Musk as its leader. DOGE is leveraging OPM's authority and influence to execute the Trump administration's initiatives for restructuring the federal workforce.

Charles Ezell, OPM's acting director, has been issuing guidance and memos to implement Trump's executive orders, including his January 27 memorandum regarding Schedule F. This aligns closely with DOGE's objectives and workforce restructuring plans.

Other efforts in line with DOGE's goals include revising telework policies, considering the termination of recently hired federal employees, and instructing agencies to bypass certain regulations.

==== Deferred resignation program ====
In January 2025, the OPM launched a controversial "deferred resignation" program, offering federal employees the option to resign effective September 30, 2025, while continuing to receive pay and benefits until that date. The program was announced in an email headed "Fork in the Road", framed as part of a broader effort by the Trump administration to reduce the federal workforce.

The proposal faced immediate backlash from federal employees and unions. The American Federation of Government Employees (AFGE) warned workers not to accept the offer, citing concerns over potential benefit disputes and unclear legal protections. Legal experts also raised concerns about the program's unprecedented nature, questioning its compliance with federal employment laws.

==== Musk's aides and congressional oversight ====
According to Reuters, on January 20, Musk's team took control of OPM's headquarters. By January 31, it had revoked the access of several OPM senior career civil servants, blocking them from key government computer systems. This included access to the Enterprise Human Resources Integration, a comprehensive database storing sensitive information such as government employees' dates of birth, Social Security numbers, performance appraisals, and home addresses. Concerns were raised about lack of congressional oversight at OPM.

Wired reported that a group of six engineers aged between 18 and 24 who previously worked for Musk were overseeing significant U.S. government roles, particularly the OPM and DOGE. This development came as Musk's influence expands into federal agencies under the Trump administration's initiatives to reshape the federal workforce. Government watchdogs and unions have raised concerns about inexperienced people—one of whom recently graduated from high school—altering federal policies and operations.

Government watchdogs and lawmakers have demanded transparency, questioning whether Musk's associates had legal authority to oversee federal operations. The involvement of outsiders in federal decision-making raised ethics and security concerns, particularly as the administration pushed significant workforce reductions.

==== Cybersecurity lawsuit over newly deployed email servers ====
Simultaneously, OPM faced scrutiny over a newly deployed email system designed to send mass communications to federal employees. A lawsuit filed by two anonymous federal workers alleged that OPM failed to conduct a Privacy Impact Assessment (PIA) before launching the system, potentially exposing sensitive government communications.

Critics warned that the system lacked basic encryption protections, making it vulnerable to spoofing, phishing, and unauthorized access. Some federal IT departments reportedly advised employees to flag all messages from the new system as potential phishing attempts due to authentication concerns.

The cybersecurity controversy further exacerbated concerns over OPM's security posture, especially given the agency's history with the 2015 OPM data breach, which compromised over 21 million federal employees' personal records. As of early 2025, OPM had not confirmed whether the vulnerabilities had been mitigated, and the lawsuit remained ongoing.

==== Requirement that employees report accomplishments ====
On February 22, 2025, the OPM emailed all federal employees, asking them to reply with "what you accomplished last week" by midnight EST on February 24. Shortly before the email was sent, Musk posted about it on X, writing, "Failure to respond will be taken as a resignation." A claim that this action was unlawful was added to a pending lawsuit against the OPM for the mass layoffs of probationary workers. Some agencies instructed their employees not to reply to the email. On February 24, the OPM announced that employees were not required to reply to the email.

== Function ==
According to its website, OPM's mission is "recruiting, retaining and honoring a world-class force to serve the American people". OPM is partially responsible for maintaining the appearance of independence and neutrality in the administrative law system. While technically employees of the agencies they work for, administrative law judges (ALJs) are hired exclusively by OPM, effectively removing any discretionary employment procedures from other agencies. OPM uses a rigorous selection process that ranks the top three candidates for each ALJ vacancy and then selects from those candidates, generally giving preference to veterans.

OPM is also responsible for federal employee retirement applications for FERS and CSRS employees. OPM makes decisions on federal employee regular and disability retirement cases. OPM also oversees FEHB and FEGLI, federal employees' health insurance and life insurance programs. But it does not oversee TSP, which is handled by the Federal Retirement Thrift Investment Board (FRTIB), a separate independent agency.

OPM also had an innovation team, the Lab at OPM, that worked on complex challenges using human-centered design with federal partners ranging from CDC, VA, and others. On April 18, 2025, the entire team was eliminated by DOGE and the Trump agenda. The Lab at OPM aimed to understand and listen to people most impacted by government decisions in order to improve government. In December 2025, OPM announced the establishment of the United States Tech Force, a cross-government hiring initiative intended to recruit about 1,000 technologists for two-year terms to work on federal technology modernization projects, including AI-related efforts, across multiple agencies.

At an underground limestone mine in Boyers, Pennsylvania, federal employees' retirements are processed on paper by hand, and the information is stored in file cabinets. On average, it takes 61 days to process a retirement.

=== Components ===
- Retirement Services – Oversees the Civil Service Retirement System (CSRS) and the Federal Employees Retirement System (FERS).
- Healthcare & Insurance – Oversees the Federal Employees Health Benefits (FEHB) and Federal Employees' Group Life Insurance (FEGLI) programs.
- Employee Services Branch

== Directors of OPM ==
Source: OPM's Agency Leadership Through Time

Denotes acting capacity.

Name	Start	End	President	Ref(s)
Alan K. Campbell	January 2, 1979	January 20, 1981	Jimmy Carter (1977–1981)	
Donald J. Devine	March 23, 1981	March 25, 1985	Ronald Reagan (1981–1989)	
Loretta Cornelius; Acting	March 25, 1985	August 22, 1985	Ronald Reagan (1981–1989)	
Constance Horner	August 22, 1985	May 10, 1989	Ronald Reagan (1981–1989)	
Constance Berry Newman	June 8, 1989	June 30, 1992	George H. W. Bush (1989–1993)	
James B. King	April 7, 1993	September 1, 1997	Bill Clinton (1993–2001)	
Janice Lachance	November 12, 1997	January 20, 2001	Bill Clinton (1993–2001)	
Steven Cohen; Acting	January 20, 2001	July 11, 2001	George W. Bush (2001–2009)	
Kay Coles James	July 11, 2001	January 31, 2005	George W. Bush (2001–2009)	
Dan Blair; Acting	February 1, 2005	June 27, 2005	George W. Bush (2001–2009)	
Linda M. Springer	June 28, 2005	August 13, 2008	George W. Bush (2001–2009)	
Michael Hager; Acting	August 13, 2008	January 20, 2009	George W. Bush (2001–2009)	
Kathie Ann Whipple; Acting	January 20, 2009	April 13, 2009	Barack Obama (2009–2017)	
John Berry	April 13, 2009	April 13, 2013	Barack Obama (2009–2017)	
Elaine Kaplan; Acting	April 13, 2013	November 4, 2013	Barack Obama (2009–2017)	
Katherine Archuleta	November 4, 2013	July 10, 2015	Barack Obama (2009–2017)	
Beth Cobert; Acting	July 10, 2015	January 20, 2017	Barack Obama (2009–2017)	
Kathleen McGettigan; Acting	January 20, 2017	March 9, 2018	Donald Trump (2017–2021)	
Jeff Pon	March 9, 2018	October 5, 2018	Donald Trump (2017–2021)	
Margaret Weichert; Acting	October 5, 2018	September 16, 2019	Donald Trump (2017–2021)	
Dale Cabaniss	September 16, 2019	March 17, 2020	Donald Trump (2017–2021)	
Michael Rigas; Acting	March 17, 2020	January 20, 2021	Donald Trump (2017–2021)	
Kathleen McGettigan; Acting	January 20, 2021	June 24, 2021	Joe Biden (2021–2025)	
Kiran Ahuja	June 24, 2021	May 6, 2024	Joe Biden (2021–2025)	
Rob Shriver; Acting	May 6, 2024	January 20, 2025	Joe Biden (2021–2025)	
Charles Ezell; Acting	January 20, 2025	July 14, 2025	Donald Trump (2025–present)	
Scott Kupor	July 14, 2025	present	Donald Trump (2025–present)	

== See also ==
- Civil service
- Combined Federal Campaign
- Federal Executive Boards
- Federal Labor Relations Authority
- Hatch Act
- Human Resources University
- Intergovernmental Personnel Act
- Ministry of Personnel Management (South Korea)
- Presidential Management Fellows Program
- Title 5 of the Code of Federal Regulations
- United States Merit Systems Protection Board
