= Richard Sylvester =

Richard Sylvester may refer to:

- Richard H. Sylvester (1859–1930), police chief
- Richard H. Sylvester (writer) (1830–1895), journalist of Iowa
- Rick Sylvester (born 1942), stuntman
