= Peter Newsham =

Former Chief of Police of the Metropolitan Police Department of the District of Columbia

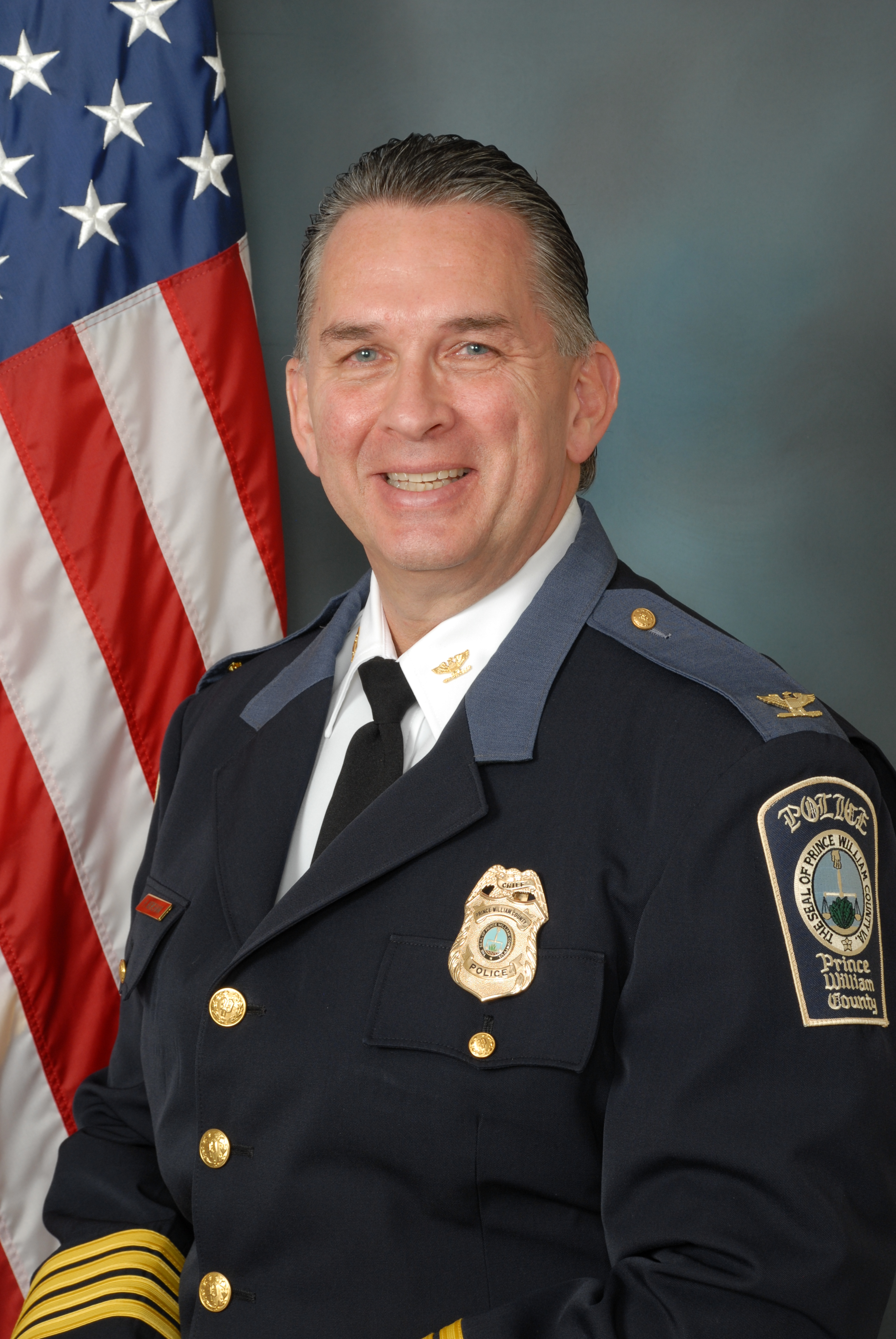
- Newsham in 2021
- Born: 1963 or 1964 (age 62–63); Providence, Rhode Island, U.S.
- Education: College of the Holy Cross (BA); University of Maryland (JD)
- Police career
- Allegiance: District of Columbia; Prince William County, Virginia
- Department: Metropolitan Police Department of the District of Columbia; Prince William County Police Department
- Service years: 1989–2020; 2020–present
- Rank: Chief of Police

Peter Newsham (born 1963 or 1964) is an American lawyer who was the chief of the Metropolitan Police Department of the District of Columbia from January 2017 to January 2021. He is currently Chief of the Prince William County Police Department in Virginia, having been appointed to that post in November 2020.

A veteran of the police department of Washington, D.C., since 1989, he participated in various capacities in numerous high-profile investigations and arrests, including the disappearance of Chandra Levy, the Washington Navy Yard shooting, and the murder of Seth Rich. He became the Chief of Police in January 2017, after having previously served as deputy to his predecessor, Police Chief Cathy Lanier. In November 2020, it was announced that Newsham would be leaving the District to become Chief of Police for nearby Prince William County, Virginia; he was succeeded in the District of Columbia in January 2021 by Robert Contee.

== Early life and education ==
Newsham was born in Providence, Rhode Island, and grew up in Weymouth, Massachusetts. He attended North Adams State College (since renamed the Massachusetts College of Liberal Arts) and received a B.A. from the College of the Holy Cross in Worcester, Massachusetts. After graduating, Newsham moved to Washington, D.C., with the intention of getting a job on Capitol Hill. Newsham never worked on Capitol Hill, and ended up applying to the Metropolitan Police Department.

In 1996, Newsham attended the University of Maryland Francis King Carey School of Law and earned his J.D. degree in 2000. As of 2020, Newsham is a member in good standing of the Maryland and District of Columbia bars.

== Career ==
Newsham joined the Metropolitan Police Department in 1989. In the 1990s, Newsham was selected by then-Chief Charles H. Ramsey "to oversee a department overhaul after concerns surfaced in the late 1990s over the high number of deadly shootings by officers". In 2000 Chief Ramsey appointed Newsham Commander of the Second District. In April of that year he participated in the investigation of a high-profile shooting at the National Zoo. Newsham also participated in the investigation of the May 2001 disappearance of federal intern Chandra Levy. In April 2002, Newsham was reported to have "ordered police officers to cordon off Pershing Park, about two blocks from the White House, after he observed some protesters committing acts of vandalism". This was characterized by detractors of the decision as a mass arrests of protesters, with attorneys claiming protesters were arrested without any notice to disperse. The final settlement resulting from the case was $13.25 million in which the court ruled Newsham’s order of mass arrests was made without probable cause and violated the protestors' constitutional rights.

Also in 2002 Newsham’s ex-wife filed a protective order against him following allegations of physical violence. In family court she accused him of physically assaulting her stating "He in turn, turned around, busted my teeth, gave me a black eye, busted my lip. I still have the scar." During court proceedings Newsham also admitted to having had his service weapon taken away from him in the 1990s, allegedly for an alcohol-related incident.

=== Assistant Chief positions and matters ===
In 2002, Chief Ramsey promoted Newsham to Assistant Chief and placed him in charge of the Office of Professional Responsibility, which includes the Internal Affairs Division, Civil Rights Division, and the Force Investigation Team.

In July 2004 Newsham was placed in charge of Regional Operations Command-North. In that capacity, Newsham reported in 2003 that the department had confirmed that a class of armor-piercing handguns that Congress was seeking to ban had been tested by the department and found to be capable of penetrating police body armor. In 2007, Newsham took over as Assistant Chief of the Internal Affairs Bureau. In 2008, Newsham oversaw the issuance by police of the first handgun permits in the District of Columbia in 32 years, following the ruling by the United States Supreme Court in District of Columbia v. Heller, which struck down the District's ban on handgun ownership.

The following year, in 2009, Newsham was given charge of the Investigative Services Bureau, overseeing all of the city's detectives as well as all cases. As Chief of Investigations to Chief Lanier, Newsham "was instrumental in helping Lanier reduce homicides". This oversight included a 2008 case where an 11-year-old girl reported being raped twice, but was then charged by the investigating officers with filing a false report after she confused which men raped her; Newsham inherited oversight of the case with his 2009 promotion, and his handling of the case was later criticized in the mid-2010s. The victim’s mother accused Newsham of lying to her and ruining her daughter's life, stating Newsham "did more than ruin my daughter's life--my husband, myself, family members, close friends. It's been eight, nine years and we're not over it." Further reports of mishandled sexual assault cases were made during Newsham's tenure with the Investigative Services Bureau with a third party investigation uncovering hundreds of sexual assault reports that went undocumented by detectives.

In 2013, Newsham commanded the response to the Washington Navy Yard shooting. In 2016, Newsham oversaw the investigation of the murder of Seth Rich, noting that there was no information to support internet rumors that the death was connected to WikiLeaks involvement in the 2016 Democratic National Committee email leak. Over the course of his career, Newsham was also the commanding officer supervising four presidential inaugurations and papal visits to the District by Pope Benedict XVI in 2008 and Pope Francis in 2015.

Newsham was a finalist for the position of chief of police in both Fort Myers, Florida, and Phoenix, Arizona. Of the 65 applicants for the position in Phoenix, Newsham was one of the three finalists, the only one not previously associated with the Phoenix Police Department. Newsham was one of eight finalists for the position in Fort Myers.

=== Appointment as Chief of Police ===
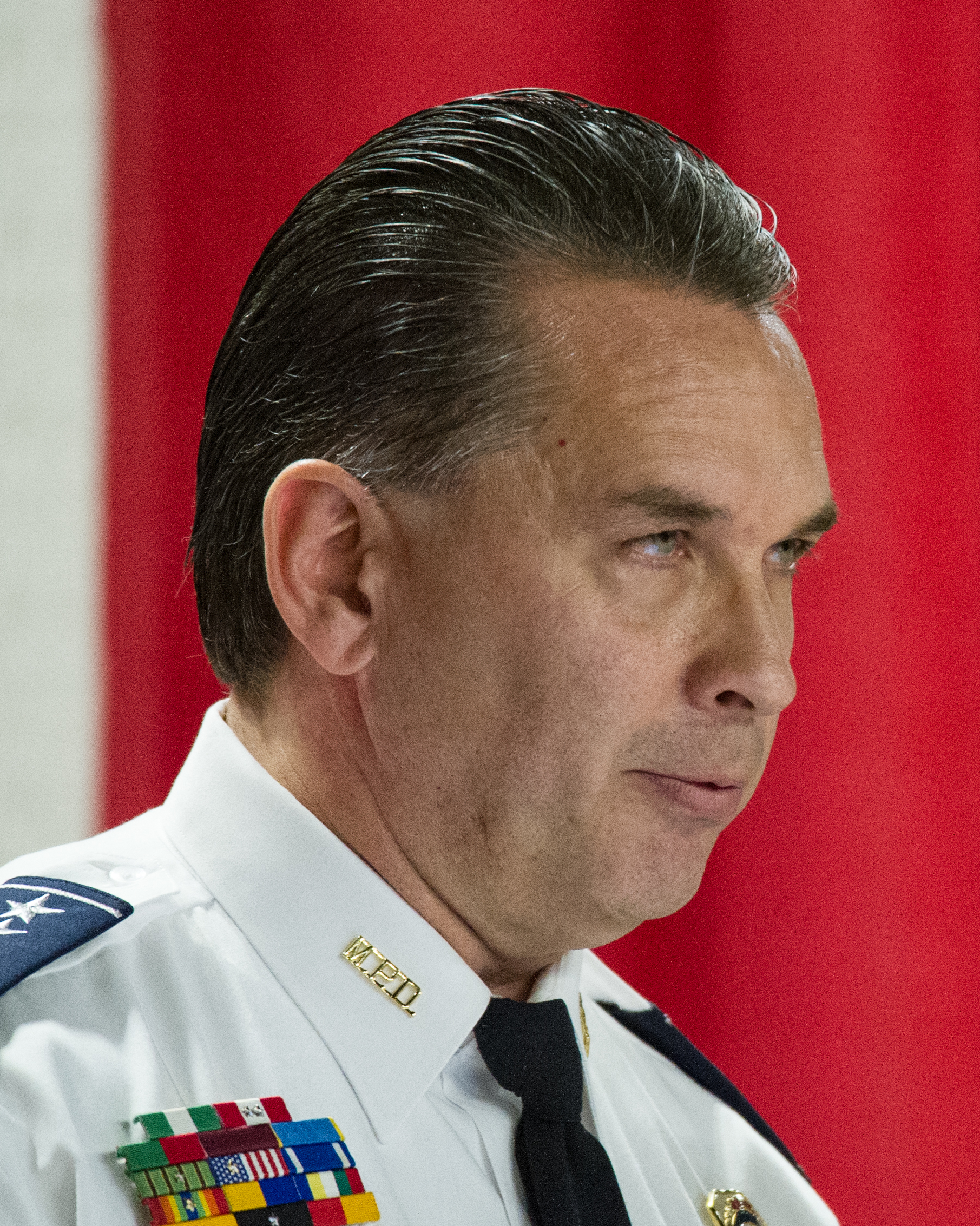
Newsham in January 2017

Following the departure of Cathy Lanier as Chief Of Police in September 2016, Newsham was named Interim Police Chief by Mayor Muriel Bowser. As Interim Police Chief, one of the first matters to be addressed by Newsham was the investigation of Edgar Maddison Welch for firing shots from an AR-15-style rifle at the Comet Ping Pong pizzeria. Welch had been convinced by Pizzagate conspiracy theory proponents on the internet that the restaurant was part of a Democratic Party child sex ring. Newsham visited the restaurant in a show of support the following week, speaking out against the consequences of fake news. In January 2017, Newsham oversaw city-wide police preparations for the Inauguration of Donald Trump, with its anticipated high number of protests.

In February 2017 Newsham was nominated as Chief of Police by Mayor Muriel Bowser. Protester disruptions caused the suspension of his first oversight hearing, and the ACLU recommended delaying the confirmation vote until an investigation was concluded. In defending her nomination of Newsham to be police chief, Mayor Bowser praised his "commitment to transparency" and "“availability to his officers and members of the public", and said she was impressed with the job her nominee did as interim chief, citing the police department's performance during the Presidential Inauguration of Donald Trump and the ensuing Women's March on Washington on his watch.

On the eve of a confirmation vote by the D.C. council, the Washington City Paper said of the nominee, "He's generally respected by the rank-and-file when it comes to policing, and he has managed to forge his own reputation as a leader despite years of being the main enforcer for former Chief Cathy Lanier, who was not particularly well liked by the rank-and-file", while noting allegations of domestic and alcohol abuse made in the 1990s, and "a professional history stained by a high-profile mass arrest gone bad". Newsham was approved by the Council in a 12-1 vote, with the sole dissenting vote coming from Councilmember David Grosso.

== Administration as Chief of Police ==
Newsham has identified his priorities as chief to address trust in the community and officer morale.

Following a massive gunfight in Northeast Washington in January 2019, in which more than 40 bullets were fired in front of a barbershop long suspected by police to be an "open-air drug market", activists and D.C. Council members criticized what they called illegal and aggressive searches by officers. In response, Newsham asserted that Council members had emboldened the drug dealers by suggesting that police had acted inappropriately. Community activists called the assertion shocking.

In September 2019, data released by MPD pursuant to a court order found significant disparities among stops by officers. African Americans accounted for 70% of all police stops while D.C. is 47% African American. Newsham disputed whether the data, taken over a four-week period, was representative. By October 2019, homicides had increased 11 percent from the same time in 2018, which rose 40 percent from the previous year. 2019 had the highest number of homicides in a decade and the trend continued into 2020. To fight the rise, Newsham authorized overtime pay for officer patrol. Newsham was inadvertently caught on camera saying that he thought homicides would continue unabated. In January 2020, Newsham announced that D.C. police will no longer handcuff children under 12, except as needed to protect the child or the public from danger. In a March 2020 D.C. Council meeting, Newsham confirmed that the MPD was conducting multiple internal investigations into crime underreporting, but assured the council that "when we report out on crime statistics, we do it as accurately as we can".

As he had in his previous roles, Newsham also addressed gun violence as Chief of Police. In October 2019, he "expressed frustration that more isn't being done to deal with repeat gun offenders". In February 2020, he noted that detectives were working with federal agencies to investigate the origins of privately made firearms. Newsham joined the mayor and other officials in saying that "action was necessary to stop the flow of ghost guns into the city". In March 2020, Newsham praised incoming U.S. Attorney Tim Shea for the latter's agreement to aggressively pursue gun violence and gun crimes by repeat violent offenders.

Following George Floyd protests in Washington, D.C., in May and June 2020, Newsham objected to some reforms introduced by the D.C. Council, while supporting others. The Council sought to bring greater accountability, limit the use of force against unarmed civilians, and make it easier to fire officers, among other reforms. In particular, Newsham objected to provisions regarding the release of body-camera footage, which historically had generally not been released. Newsham said police officers "feel they have been abandoned", and that the council's actions failed to reflect years of reforms within the department, while Councilmembers said he had missed the point of the protests, with members Robert White, Charles Allen, and Vincent C. Gray asserting that his comments were dangerous. In July 2020, in response to litigation filed in the aftermath of the use of force to clear protesters for the Donald Trump photo op at St. John's Church, Newsham denied that officers in his department were involved in that action.

In November 2020, it was announced that Newsham would be leaving the District to become Chief of Police for nearby Prince William County, Virginia.

== Personal life ==
Newsham lives in Woodbridge, Virginia. He has two children from a previous marriage, and two children from a previous relationship. Newsham has lived in the greater Washington area for over 30 years and is a Boston Red Sox and New England Patriots fan; however, he has stated that the Washington Commanders is his favorite National Football Conference team. As of 2020, Newsham is a member of the Maryland State Bar.

Police appointments
Preceded by Cathy Lanier	Chief of the Metropolitan Police Department of the District of Columbia	Succeeded by Robert Contee
