= Altegrity Risk International =

Global risk consulting firm

Altegrity Risk International, Inc.
- Type: Subsidiary
- Founded: 2010
- Defunct: 2015
- Headquarters: New York City, U.S.
- Key people: William Bratton, Chairman; Michael Beber, CEO
- Parent: Altegrity, Inc.
- Website: altegrityrisk.com

Altegrity Risk International (ARI) was a New York City-based risk consulting and information services company from 2010 to 2015. A subsidiary of Altegrity, Inc. of Falls Church, VA, ARI provided investigations, business intelligence, forensic accounting, compliance and monitoring and security services to businesses and government agencies around the world.

In February 2015, the company filed for bankruptcy. After their bankruptcy, Altegrity settled with the United States Department of Justice for $30 million over fraud charges. ARI became part of the Kroll, Inc. business unit.

== Founding ==
After launching in February 2010, the company named William Bratton as chairman, and acquired Corporate Risk International (CRI), a firm that has performed over 65,000 due diligence reviews and investigations in more than 150 countries.

Altegrity Risk International investigated backgrounds of companies and individuals on behalf of clients in the course of both pre-emptive and post-crisis engagements. ARI was the firm that vetted the background of whistleblower Edward Snowden. ARI also produced due diligence reviews for clients involved in principal investing, hedge fund investments (in the course of both compliance and transactional diligence) as well as those who seek to understand risk and opportunities associated with doing business with individuals and companies worldwide.

Altegrity Security Consulting provided advisory and training services to international civilian police departments, consulting on operational effectiveness as well as crisis management and through CRI, strategies and services for managing kidnap, ransom and extortion crisis.

== Security failures ==
Through its subsidiary, USIS, Altegrity is the company which vetted the security clearance of Edward Snowden and Aaron Alexis.

The U.S. government terminated two major contracts with the company after security intrusions said to be "state-sponsored".

Kroll Laboratory Specialists, Inc. ( "KLS" ), another subsidiary of Kroll, Inc., was sued by Eric Landon in NY ( Landon v. Kroll ) for failing to comply with NYS and other standards for Forensic Toxicology testing, whereby KLS was to provide completed drug tests to law enforcement agencies to be used as evidence in courts. As in USIS/Snowden, KLS was profiteering by skipping necessary aspects of the toxicology testing. As a result, countless people were falsely prosecuted and incarcerated on the KLS fraudulent lab reports.

== Bankruptcy ==
ARI was a subsidiary of Altegrity Inc, and was owned by Providence Equity Partners, a venture capital firm. As of 31 December 2014, creditors led by Oaktree Capital Management were nearing an agreement to seize control of Altegrity Inc.

In February 2015, the company filed for bankruptcy. After their bankruptcy, Altegrity settled with the United States Department of Justice for $30 million over fraud charges. ARI became part of the Kroll, Inc. business unit.

== See also ==
- USIS
