= Laurie O. Robinson =

American scholar and public servant

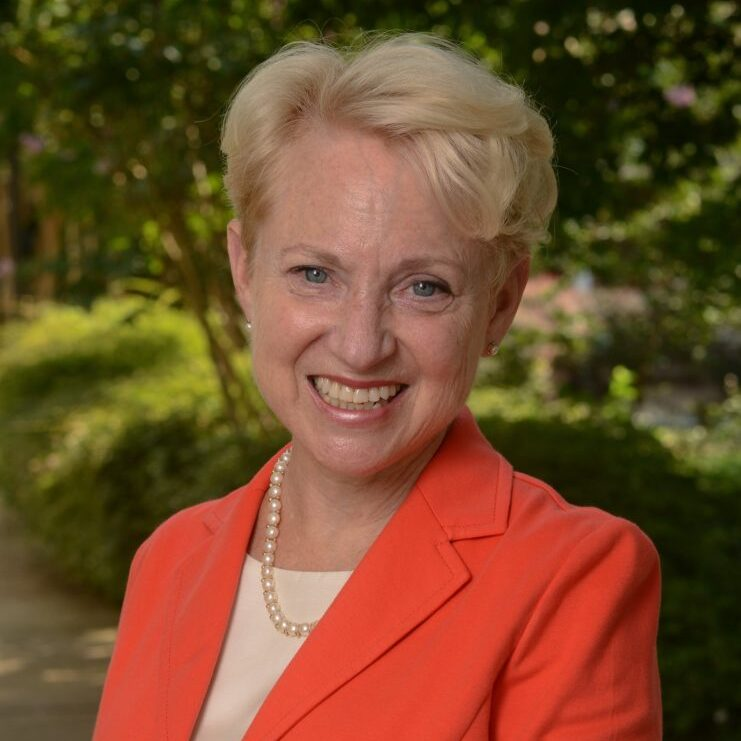
- Born: July 7, 1946 (age 79); Washington, D.C.
- Education: B.A., Political Science, Brown University
- Occupations: Clarence J. Robinson Professor Emerita of Criminology, Law, and Society at George Mason University

Laurie Robinson (born July 7, 1946) is an American scholar and public servant who has held multiple positions across government, academia, and the nonprofit sector. Robinson's most notable roles include serving as Assistant Attorney General in charge of the U.S. Department of Justice Office of Justice Programs under former Presidents Bill Clinton and Barack Obama, and co-chairing Obama's Task Force on 21st Century Policing. She also served on the congressionally created Charles Colson Task Force on Federal Corrections and on an independent commission that explored the potential closure of New York City's Rikers Island jail complex. Most recently, Robinson served as founding Chair of the Board of Directors of the Council on Criminal Justice, a nonpartisan policy and research organization.

== Early life and education ==
Robinson was born (July 7, 1946) and raised in Washington, D.C. She graduated magna cum laude and Phi Beta Kappa from Brown University in 1968 with a B.A. in Political Science.

== Career ==
Robinson began her professional career as a journalist, spending three years reporting and editing for the Community News Service.

In 1972, she joined the American Bar Association and spent seven years as assistant staff director for the criminal justice division and 14 years as director. During her tenure, she founded the ABA's Juvenile Justice Center and led initiatives on sentencing, federal criminal code reform, and indigent defense.

From 1993 to 2000, Robinson served as the Senate-confirmed, presidentially appointed Assistant Attorney General in the U.S. Department of Justice Office of Justice Programs (OJP) under President Clinton. She established OJP's Office of Domestic Preparedness, spearheading federal engagement with state and local governments concentrating on strategies to address crime. Throughout her time in office, Robinson oversaw the most substantial surge in federal expenditure toward crime-related research in U.S. history. She launched projects focusing on violence against women, drug treatment courts, and law enforcement technology.

After leaving the administration, Robinson served from 2001 to 2009 as a distinguished senior scholar in the University of Pennsylvania's Jerry Lee Center of Criminology and as executive director of its Forum on Crime and Justice. During this time, she also served as the Director of the Master of Science Program in the university's Department of Criminology.

In 2008, Robinson returned to government service when President Obama appointed her to a second tour as Assistant Attorney General in charge of OJP. In her time at OJP, she emphasized science and evidence-based programming. Notably, she led the launch of a project that improved the integration of evidence into OJP programs. Combined with her service under President Clinton, Robinson's time leading OJP is the longest of any director in the agency's 50-year history.

In 2012, Robinson joined George Mason University as the Clarence J. Robinson Professor of Criminology, Law, and Society. She retired from this position in 2021, but she remains a Senior Fellow at the university's Center for Evidence-Based Crime Policy.

== President's Task Force on 21st Century Policing ==
In 2014, President Obama named Robinson Co-Chair, with former Philadelphia and Washington, D.C., police leader Charles H. Ramsey, of the President's Task Force on 21st Century Policing. Created by executive order, the panel was established in response to the unrest in Ferguson, MO, following the police shooting of Michael Brown. The 11-member task force included academics, law enforcement officials, and civil rights activists. Its mission was to identify policing best practices and develop recommendations to strengthen trust between law enforcement officers and the communities they serve. The task force final report and recommendations were released in May 2015. A renewed "call to action" was released by Robinson, Ramsey, and other task force members in April 2023 following the killing of Tyre Nichols by Memphis police.

== Other leadership roles ==
In 2014, Robinson was named to the Charles Colson Task Force on Federal Corrections, a congressionally mandated panel charged with examining challenges in the federal prison system and developing practical, data-driven policy responses. Two years later, she was appointed to an independent commission convened to explore the potential for closing New York City's Rikers Island jail complex.

Robinson has served as a leader or member of more than three dozen organizational boards and committees. Currently, Robinson is a member of the Council on Criminal Justice Board of Directors, which she chaired from 2019 to 2024. Previous positions include member and chair of the Board of Trustees of the Vera Institute of Justice (2001-2009 and 2013–2017); Board of Directors member for The Constitution Project (2000–2009), the National Center for Victims of Crimes (2000–2009), the Police Foundation (2002–2009), and the National Policing Institute (2019-present); Advisory Board member for the Federal Sentencing Reporter (1991–2009), CURE Violence (2012-present), the Coalition for Evidence-Based Policy (2005–2009), the Justice Policy Network (2015–2020), the Institute of Criminology Police Executive Programme, Cambridge University (2008–2009), and the George Mason University Administration of Justice Program (2000–2009).

In addition, Robinson has served as a consultant on policing and other criminal justice issues for multiple organizations, including the Justice Management Institute, the Council of State Governments, Abt Associates, and The Pew Charitable Trusts.

== Recognition ==
In 1997, Robinson received the National Council on Crime & Delinquency's Roscoe Pound Award for significant and sustained commitment to promoting criminal justice reforms that are fair, humane, and economically sound.

In 2000, she received the Edmond J. Randolph Award for outstanding service to the United States Department of Justice, presented by Attorney General Janet Reno.

In 2009, she was named the Elected Honorary Fellow of the Academy of Experimental Criminology in recognition of Outstanding Contributions to Experimental Criminology.

In 2010, she received the Blueprints for Violence Prevention's Pioneer in Prevention Award for Vision and Leadership in Promotion of Effective Crime Prevention Policy.

In 2011, she received the International Community Corrections Association's Margaret Mead Award for Leadership in the Justice Field.

In 2012, Robinson received the National Criminal Justice Association's Career Service Award for substantial contributions to the field of criminal justice, as well as the Justice Policy Leadership Award, presented by SEARCH, The National Consortium for Justice Information and Statistics.

In 2013, she received the Distinguished Achievement Award in Evidence-Based Crime Policy from the George Mason University Center for Evidence-Based Crime Policy, where she is a Senior Fellow.

== Selected bibliography ==
- Robinson, L., "Five Years after Ferguson: Reflecting on Police Reform and What's Ahead," ANNALS, AAPSS, 687. January 2020. DOI: 10.1177/0002716219887372.
- Robinson, L., "50 Years Later: The Kerner Commission Legacy," Translational Criminology (Fall, 2018).
- Robinson, L., "Policing in the U.S.: From the Kerner Legacy Looking Forward," in Fred Harris and Alan Curtis (eds.), Healing our Divided Society – Investing in America Fifty Years After the Kerner Report. Temple University Press. (2018).
- Robinson, L., Ramsey C. The Future of Policing Reform: The Way Forward? Public Administration Review, Vol. 77, Iss. 2. March/April 2017. DOI: 10.111/puar.12736.
- Lum, C., Koper, C., Gill, C., Hibdon J., Telep, C., & Robinson, L. An Evidence-Assessment of the Recommendations of the President's Task Force on 21st Century Policing: Implementation and Research Priorities. Alexandria, VA: International Association of Chiefs of Police. (2016).
- Robinson, L. & Abt, T., "Evidence-informed Criminal Justice Policy: Looking Back, Moving Forward," in Thomas Blomberg, Julie Mestre Brancale, Kevin Beaver and William Bales, (eds.), Advancing Criminology and Criminal Justice Policy. Routledge. (2016)
- Davis, E. & Robinson, L., "Modeling Successful Research-Practitioner Partnerships," Translational Criminology (Fall, 2014).
- Robinson, L., Introduction to Reducing Crime, Reducing Incarceration: Essays on Criminal Justice Innovation. Berman, Greg. New Orleans: Quid Pro LLC (2013).
- Braga, A., Robinson, L., & Davis, E., "Encouraging a Broader Set of Criminologists to Form Research Partnerships with Police Departments," The Criminologist, Vol. 38, No. 4 (July/August 2013).
- Robinson, L., "Bridging the Gap between Science and Criminal Justice Policy: The Federal Role," Translational Criminology (Spring 2013).
- Robinson, L., "Federal Leaders: Larger Role on Reentry," Advancing Practice (April 2013).
- Robinson, L., Foreword to From Juvenile Delinquency to Adult Crime: Criminal Careers, Justice Policy and Prevention. Loeber, Rolf, and Farrington, David, eds. New York: Oxford University Press (2012).
- Robinson, L., "Bringing Science to the Forefront of Criminal Justice Policy," The Criminologist, Vol. 37, No. 2 (March/April 2012).
- Robinson, L., "Exploring Certainty and Severity: Perspectives from a Federal Perch," Criminology and Public Policy, Vol. 10, Issue 1 (February 2011).
- Robinson, L., "The Federal Role in Promoting Evidence-Based Practice," The Academy of Experimental Criminology Newsletter, Vol. 5, Issue 1 (April 2010).
- Robinson, L., "Restoring Federal Leadership on Crime Policy," Federal Sentencing Reporter, Vol. 20, No. 5 (June, 2008).
- Robinson, L., "Commentary on McCoy -- Problem-Solving Courts," American Criminal Law Review, Vol. 40., No. 4 (Fall, 2003).
- Robinson, L., "Sex Offender Management: The Public Policy Challenges," in Robert A. Prentky, Eric S. Janus, Michael C. Seto, (Eds.), Sexually Coercive Behavior: Understanding and Management, Ann. NY. Acad. Sci., Vol. 989 (2003).
- Robinson, L., "The Future Federal Role in State and Local Criminal Justice Assistance: Gazing into the Legislative Crystal Ball," Corrections Today (December, 2002).
- Travis, J., Robinson, L., Solomon, A., "Prisoner Reentry: Issues for Practice and Policy," Criminal Justice (Spring 2002).
- Robinson, L., and Travis, J., "Managing Prisoner Reentry for Public Safety," Federal Sentencing Reporter, Vol. 12, No. 5 (March/April 2000).
- Robinson, L., "Sex Offender Recidivism: A Challenge for the Court," Court Review (Journal of the American Judges Association) (Spring, 1999).
- Robinson, L., "Introduction," Justice Research & Policy, Vol. 1, No. l (Spring, 1999).
- Robinson, L., "Managing Sex Offenders in the Community: Challenges and Progress," Perspectives (publication of the American Probation and Parole Association), (Fall, 1998).
