= Adam Gelb =

Founder and president of the Council on Criminal Justice

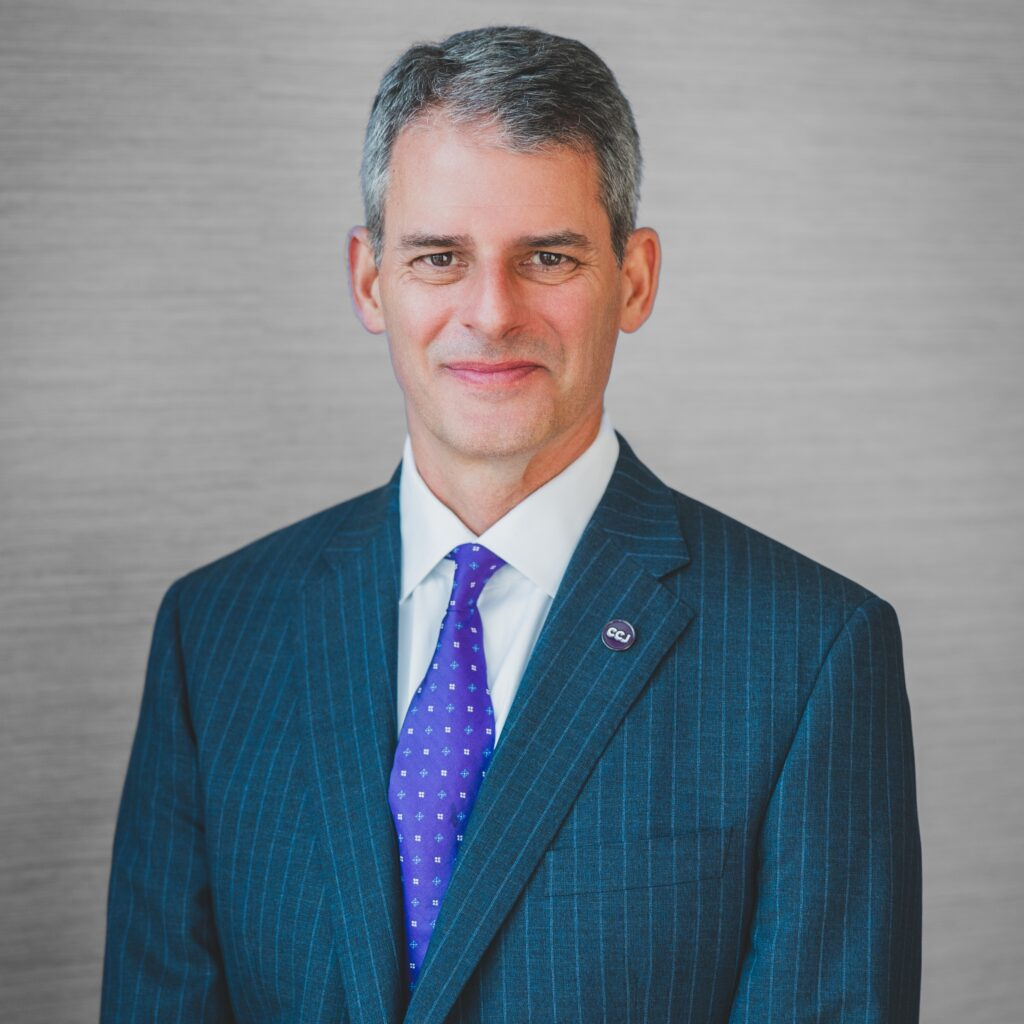
- Born: Hartford, Connecticut
- Education: University of Virginia (BA) Harvard University (MPP)
- Occupations: Founder, President, and CEO of the Council on Criminal Justice

Adam Barnet Gelb is the founder, president, and CEO of the Council on Criminal Justice, a nonpartisan think tank and invitational membership organization that produces research and policy proposals to improve state, federal, and local public safety and justice systems. A former journalist, congressional aide, and senior state government official, Gelb is also a former director of the Public Safety Performance Project at The Pew Charitable Trusts. He regularly advises federal, state, and local policymakers and provides analysis and commentary on crime and justice issues for national and local media.

== Early life and education ==
Born to Judith Cohen Gelb and Leslie H. “Les” Gelb in Hartford, Connecticut, Gelb grew up in Alexandria, Virginia, with two sisters. Gelb’s father was a federal government official, a correspondent, editor, and columnist for The New York Times, and a president of the Council on Foreign Relations. Inspired by his father's work, Gelb pursued a career in journalism and public policy. He earned a Bachelor of Arts degree in government and history from the University of Virginia in 1987, serving in 1986 as news editor of the student newspaper, The Cavalier Daily. In 1994, Gelb received a Master of Public Policy with a concentration in crime control and justice from Harvard University’s Kennedy School of Government.

== Career ==
Gelb began his professional career in journalism in 1987 as a reporter at The Atlanta Journal-Constitution, covering the police beat at the height of the nation’s drug war. Gelb has said his work experiences in those years persuaded him that America’s criminal justice system was not producing sufficient safety or justice. After graduating from the Harvard Kennedy School, Gelb served on the staff of the U.S. Senate Judiciary Committee during negotiations and final passage of the omnibus bipartisan Violent Crime Control and Enforcement Act of 1994, commonly referred to as the 1994 Crime Bill.

Gelb then served as policy director for Maryland Lieutenant Governor Kathleen Kennedy Townsend, where he helped initiate and oversee several projects that focused comprehensive crime control and prevention efforts toward at-risk people and neighborhoods.

He served as executive director of the Georgia governor’s Commission on Certainty in Sentencing from 2001 to 2003, where he designed a new system of sentencing options for probationers, and then as vice president for programs at the Georgia Council on Substance Abuse.

In 2006, Gelb moved to The Pew Charitable Trusts, where he directed the Public Safety Performance Project, an initiative to improve state sentencing and corrections policy. The effort became known as the Justice Reinvestment Initiative and involved partnerships with the U.S. Department of Justice, the Council of State Governments Justice Center, the Crime and Justice Institute, and other organizations. The project also published landmark research including “One in 100: Behind Bars in America,” which revealed that the U.S. incarceration rate had grown to encompass 1 percent of the adult resident population.

=== Council on Criminal Justice ===
In 2019, Gelb founded the Council on Criminal Justice (CCJ), a nonpartisan think tank and invitational membership organization that works to improve criminal justice policy in the United States. A key part of its work is facilitating consensus among diverse groups of experts on important issues in crime and criminal justice. Its commissions and task forces have produced research, findings, and policy recommendations on policing, violent crime, managing COVID’s impacts, long prison sentences, veterans, and women in the justice system, and other topics. The Council’s crime trends reports track offending patterns in a sample of U.S. cities and are routinely cited by government leaders and the media.

The Council’s boards and 350 elected members comprise people from across the ideological spectrum and various sectors and disciplines, representing law enforcement, corrections, courts, community organizations, research, and advocacy, as well as crime victims and survivors and formerly incarcerated people.

== Other Roles and Affiliations ==
Gelb serves on the advisory boards of Recidiviz, the Health and Reentry Project, Act Now, and the Cavalier Daily Alumni Association, and has previously served on the Board of Directors of the National Association of Drug Court Professionals (now All Rise) and the Stephanie Roper Committee and Foundation.

== Selected Bibliography ==
- Trump claims credit for murder drop. It's not that simple. USA Today, February 26, 2026
- Are the Most Dangerous Words in Criminal Justice About to Disappear? Newsweek, August 28, 2025
- Excessive Punishment: How the Justice System Creates Mass Incarceration in Excessive Punishment: How the Justice System Creates Mass Incarceration, Columbia University Press, April 2024.
- Reconsidering Long Sentences: The Search for Common Ground Federal Sentencing Reporter (2023) 36 (1-2): 4–5.
- On criminal justice, don't just focus on bad news. We ignore progress at our peril. USA Today, September 23, 2023.
- America's surge in violence: Why we must reduce violent crime for prison reform to work USA Today, March 9, 2021.
- You Get What You Measure: New Performance Indicators Needed to Gauge Progress of Criminal Justice Reform Papers from the Executive Session on Community Corrections, Harvard Kennedy School, May 2018
- Denney, Jacob, and Adam Gelb. National Prison Rate Continues to Decline Amid Sentencing, Re-Entry Reforms The Pew Charitable Trusts, 16 Jan. 2018,
- You Get What You Measure: Compstat for Community Corrections with William Burrell, The Pew Charitable Trusts Public Safety Performance Project, July 2007.
- Compstat for Community Corrections Perspectives: The Journal of the American Probation and Parole Association, Winter 2006, pp. 30–33.
- Tools of the Trade: A Guide to Incorporating Science into Practice with Faye S. Taxman PhD et al, Washington DC: National Institute of Corrections, December 2004.
- Forget the Extremes. Try a Dose of Both The Washington Post, Outlook Section, Sunday, May 6, 2001.
- Graduated Sanctions: Stepping into Accountable Systems and Offenders with Faye S. Taxman PhD and David Soule, The Prison Journal, June 1999, Vol. 79, No. 2, Sage Publications, pp. 182–204.
