= Chief of the Metropolitan Police Department of the District of Columbia =

Police chief in Washington, D.C.

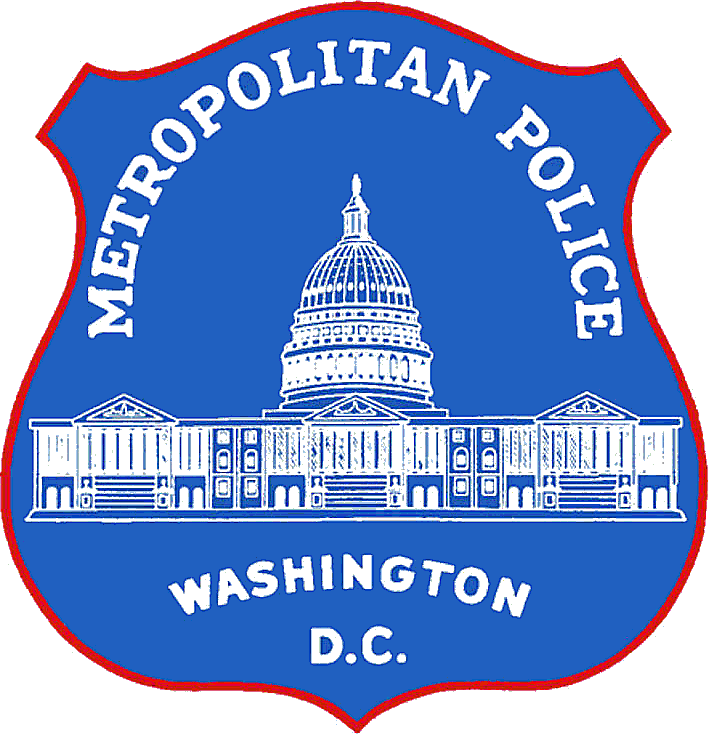
- Seal of the Metropolitan Police Department

- Flag of the District of Columbia

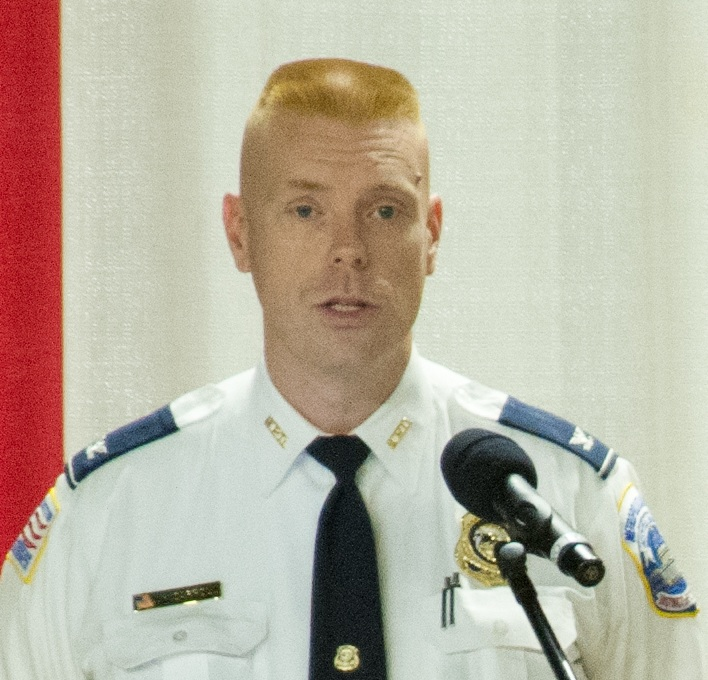
- Incumbent; Jeffery W. Carroll since: January 1, 2026; (8 months and 6 days)
- Metropolitan Police of the District of Columbia
- Reports to: Mayor of the District of Columbia
- Seat: Washington, D.C., U.S.
- Appointer: Mayor of the District of Columbia
- Precursor: Major and Superintendent
- Formation: 1953
- First holder: Robert V. Murray
- Salary: $270,000 Base
- Website: http://MPDC.DC.gov

The Chief of the Metropolitan Police Department of the District of Columbia, generally simply referred to as the Chief of Police, is the head of the Metropolitan Police Department of Washington, D.C. The current Chief of Police is Jeffery W. Carroll, who succeeded Pamela A. Smith on January 1, 2026 in an interim capacity. D.C. Mayor Muriel Bowser publicly swore in Carroll on January 6, 2026.

== History ==
In 1861, the Metropolitan Police Board unanimously chose one of its members, William Benning Webb, to serve as the first chief of the Metropolitan Police, the formal title at the time being "Major and Superintendent".

With effect from September 16, 1952, the rank and title of Major and Superintendent was abolished and replaced with the position of Chief of Police. Robert V. Murray would be the last Major and Superintendent and the first Chief of Police of the MPD, In 1953 Congress passed the District Government Reorganization Act, establishing a new Metropolitan Police Department with effect from June 26, 1953.

== Heads of the Metropolitan Police ==
The Metropolitan Police has a comprehensive list online of past and present police chiefs.

=== Chief of the Metropolitan Police Department ===
Name	Tenure	Duration
Jeffery W. Carroll (interim)	January 1, 2026 – incumbent	8 months and 6 days
Pamela A. Smith	July 17, 2023 – December 31, 2025	2 years, 5 months and 14 days
Ashan Benedict (interim)	May 24, 2023 – July 16, 2023	1 month and 22 days
Robert Contee	May 4, 2021 – May 24, 2023	2 years and 20 days
Robert Contee (interim)	January 2, 2021 – May 4, 2021	4 months and 2 days
Peter Newsham	May 2, 2017 – January 1, 2021	3 years, 7 months and 30 days
Peter Newsham (interim)	September 15, 2016 – May 2, 2017	7 months and 17 days
Cathy L. Lanier	May 4, 2007 – September 15, 2016	9 years, 4 months and 11 days
Cathy L. Lanier (interim)	January 2, 2007 – May 4, 2007	4 months and 2 days
Charles H. Ramsey	April 21, 1998 – December 28, 2006	8 years, 8 months and 7 days
Sonya Proctor (interim)	November 25, 1997 – April 21, 1998	4 months and 27 days
Larry Soulsby	December 5, 1995 – November 25, 1997	1 year, 11 months and 20 days
Fred Thomas	January 8, 1993 – July 7, 1995	2 years, 5 months and 29 days
Isaac Fulwood	August 4, 1989 – October 30, 1992	3 years, 2 months and 26 days
Maurice T. Turner, Jr.	July 1, 1981 – July 26, 1989	8 years and 25 days
Burtell M. Jefferson	January 12, 1978 – June 30 1981	3 years, 5 months and 18 days
Maurice J. Cullinane	December 15, 1974 – January 11, 1978	3 years and 27 days
Jerry V. Wilson	August 1, 1969 – September 30, 1974	5 years, 1 month and 29 days
John B. Layton	December 1, 1964 – July 31, 1969	4 years, 7 months and 30 days
Robert V. Murray	June 26, 1953 – December 1, 1964	11 years, 5 months and 5 days

=== Chief of Police, Metropolitan Police ===
Name	Tenure	Duration
Robert V. Murray	September 16, 1952 – June 26, 1953	9 months and 10 days

=== Major and Superintendent of the Metropolitan Police ===
Name	Tenure	Duration
Robert V. Murray	December 1, 1951 – September 15, 1952	9 months and 14 days
Robert J. Barrett	July 1, 1947 – November 30, 1951	4 years, 4 months and 29 days
Harvey G. Callahan	February 1, 1946 – June 30, 1947	1 year, 4 months and 29 days
Edward J. Kelly	November 1, 1941 – February 1, 1946	4 years and 3 months
Ernest W. Brown	October 22, 1932 – November 1, 1941	9 years and 10 days
Pelham D. Glassford	November 16, 1931 – October 20, 1932	11 months and 4 days
Henry G. Pratt	April 1, 1929 – November 1, 1931	2 years and 7 months
Edwin B. Hesse	October 6, 1925 – April 1, 1929	3 years, 5 months and 26 days
Daniel Sullivan	February 11, 1922 – October 1, 1925	3 years, 7 months and 20 days
Harry L. Gessford	April 19, 1920 – December 1, 1921	1 year, 7 months and 12 days
Raymond W. Pullman	April 1, 1915 – February 22, 1920	4 years, 10 months and 21 days
Richard H. Sylvester	July 18, 1898 – April 1, 1915	16 years, 8 months and 14 days
William C. Moore	December 8, 1886 – July 12, 1898	11 years, 7 months and 4 days
Samuel H. Walker	July 1, 1886 – December 1, 1886	5 months
William McEntyre Dye	April 1, 1883 – June 30, 1886	3 years, 2 months and 29 days
William G. Brock	December 1, 1879 – April 1, 1883	3 years and 4 months
Thomas P. Morgan	February 2, 1878 – November 29, 1879	1 year, 9 months and 27 days
Almarin C. Richards	December 1, 1864 – January 28, 1878	13 years, 1 month and 27 days
William Benning Webb	September 1861 – November 1864	3 years, 2 months
