= Richard H. Sylvester =

American police chief

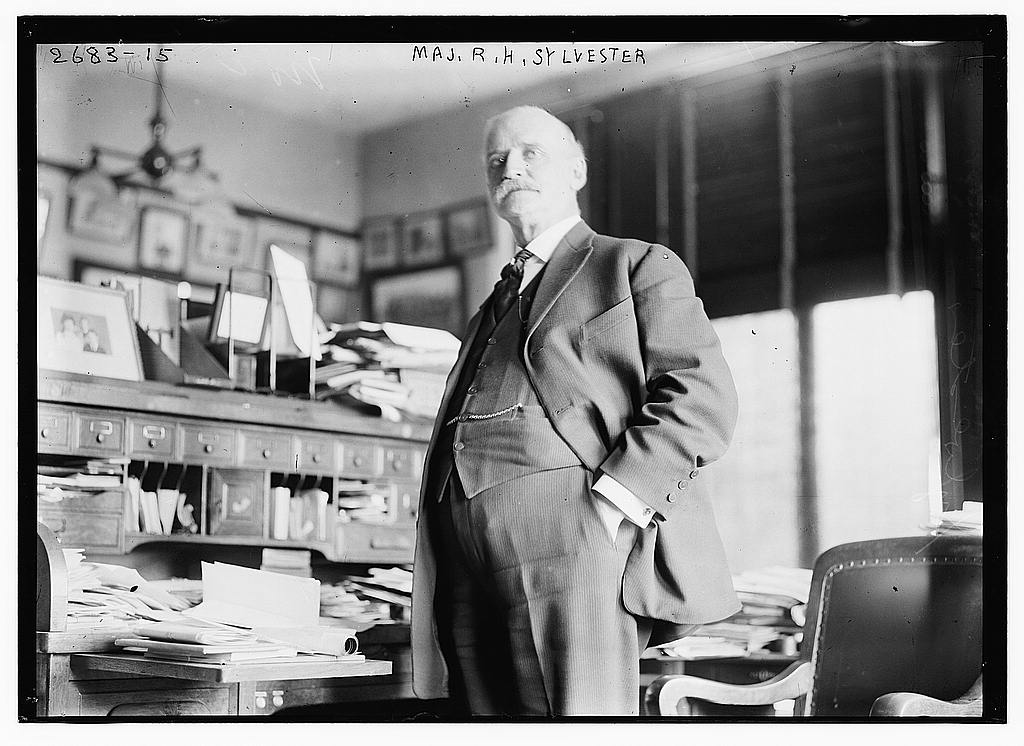
- Sylvester circa 1913

Chief of Police of Washington, DC
- In office 1898-1915
- Preceded by: William C. Moore
- Succeeded by: Raymond W. Pullman

Personal details
- Born: August 14, 1859 Iowa City, Iowa, U.S.
- Died: December 11, 1930 (aged 71) Biltmore Hotel; Wilmington, Delaware, U.S.
- Resting place: Rock Creek Cemetery; Washington, D.C., U.S.
- Spouse: Laura V.
- Children: Laura Sylvester Wood
- Parent(s): Richard H. Sylvester Sr. Martha Woods

Richard H. Sylvester Jr. (August 14, 1859 – December 11, 1930) was the Chief of Police for Washington, District of Columbia from July 1898 to April 1915. He was an early president of the International Association of Chiefs of Police (IACP). Sylvester played an influential role in militarization of U.S. police departments in the early 20th century.

== Early years and education ==
Sylvester was born in Iowa City, Iowa, on August 14, 1859, to Richard H. Sylvester Sr.

He attended Washington University in St. Louis, where he majored in law, but he dropped out to become a journalist. He began working at papers in the Midwest. He was sent to Washington, D.C., as a newspaper correspondent. He worked as a disbursement officer with the Ute Indian Commission.

== Police career ==
In 1898 Sylvester became chief of police for Washington, D.C., in 1898.

=== Militarization of police ===
During his tenure as Police Chief, Sylvester advocated for the use of the .38 caliber pistol by police (a weapon previously used by the military), referred to police officers as "citizen-soldiers", and advocated the use of similar interrogation techniques as used against Filipino insurgents by the U.S. military during the Philippine wars and occupation. Sylvester, who was police chief in Washington, D.C., which had a substantial nonwhite population, believed that racial minorities were morally degenerate and opposed racial intermingling. As police chief, his main targets were racial minorities.

Sylvester divided police procedures into the arrest as the first degree, transportation to jail as the second degree and interrogation as the third degree.

=== Retirement ===
He retired as chief of police for Washington, D.C., on March 6, 1915, after charges were filed against him for his failure to protect suffragettes during their march in Washington on the day before the inauguration of Woodrow Wilson, and accusations of corruption laid against him by Congressman Frank Park. He was succeeded by Raymond W. Pullman.

== Private sector ==
He established the du Pont protection division in 1914 to ensure the safety of the company's plants manufacturing materiel during World War I. While the war was still going on, Sylvester was serving as head of the du Pont police force in July 1918, when his investigation of an unexplained fire at a manufacturing plant led to his uncovering a plot to destroy buildings using fire extinguishers whose contents had been replaced with gasoline.

Sylvester testified before the House Judiciary Committee in April 1928 in support of a "fence" bill drafted by Representative Fiorello H. La Guardia of New York that would make the transporting or concealing of stolen goods used in interstate commerce a crime punishable by a fine of $5,000 or up to two years in prison. He was an early advocate of great cooperation across international police forces, served on a committee established by the National Crime Commission on ways to improve rural policing and participated in the development of recommendations to have employees paid by check rather than cash as a way to reduce payroll robberies.

== Death ==
He died on December 11, 1930, in Wilmington, Delaware, where he had retired from DuPont just three weeks earlier. He was buried in Rock Creek Cemetery.

== See also ==
- Metropolitan Police Department of the District of Columbia Chiefs
