= Robert Contee =

American police officer

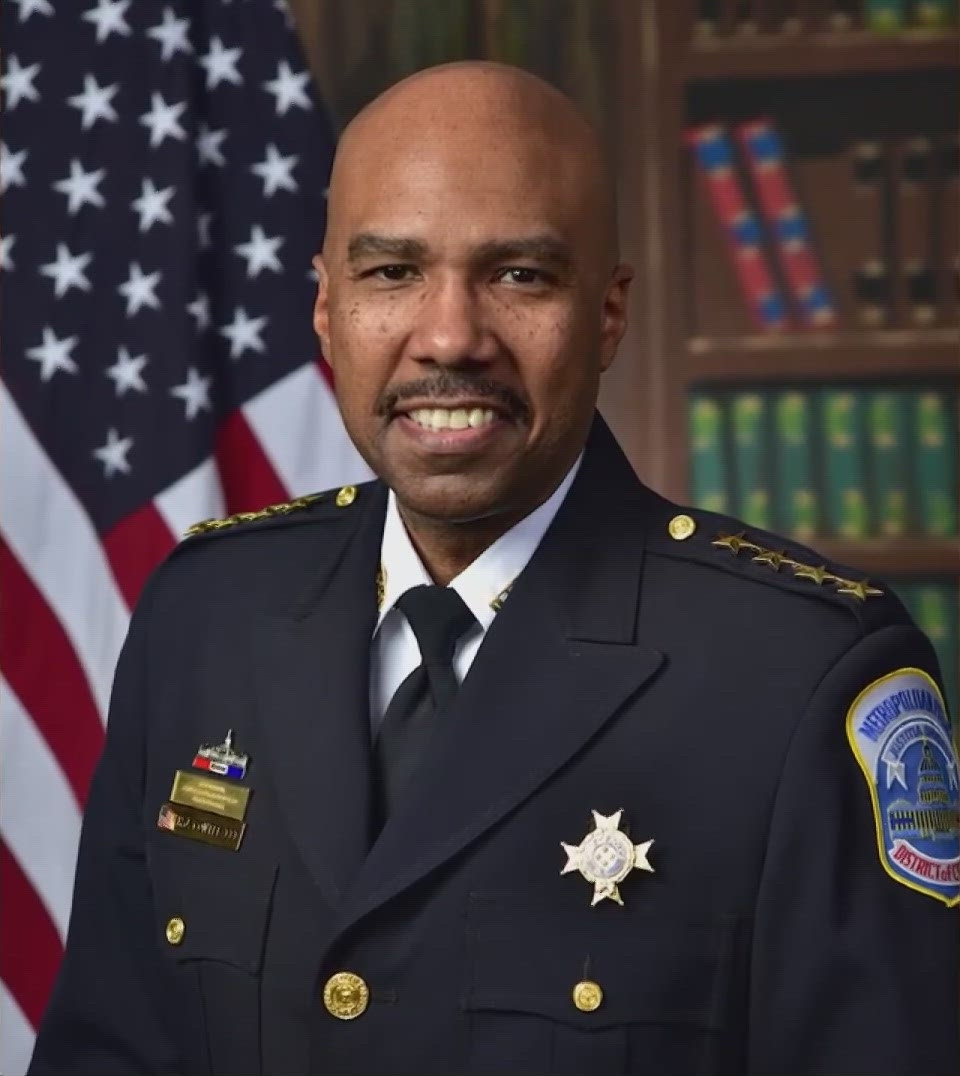
- Official portrait, c. 2022
- Born: c. 1972 (aged c. 52); Washington, D.C., United States
- Education: George Washington University (BA)
- Police career
- Allegiance: District of Columbia
- Department: Metropolitan Police Department of the District of Columbia
- Service years: 1992–2023
- Rank: Chief of Police

Robert J. Contee III (born c. 1972) is the former Chief of the Metropolitan Police Department of Washington, D.C., United States. He was appointed by Mayor Muriel Bowser as acting chief effective January 2, 2021, and was confirmed unanimously by the DC Council on May 4, replacing Peter Newsham. He retired from the Metropolitan Police Department on May 31, 2023.

== Early life and education ==
Contee grew up in the Carver Langston neighborhood of Washington, D.C., and worked a series of jobs as a teenager, and took part in then-D.C. Mayor Marion Barry's Youth Leadership Institute, eventually becoming a D.C. police cadet at 17 years old while attending Spingarn High School.

He holds a bachelor's degree in Professional Studies with concentration in Police Science from George Washington University, and has completed the Management College at the Institute for Law Enforcement Administration and the Senior Management Institute for Police (SMIP) of the Police Executive Research Forum in Boston, Massachusetts.

== Career ==
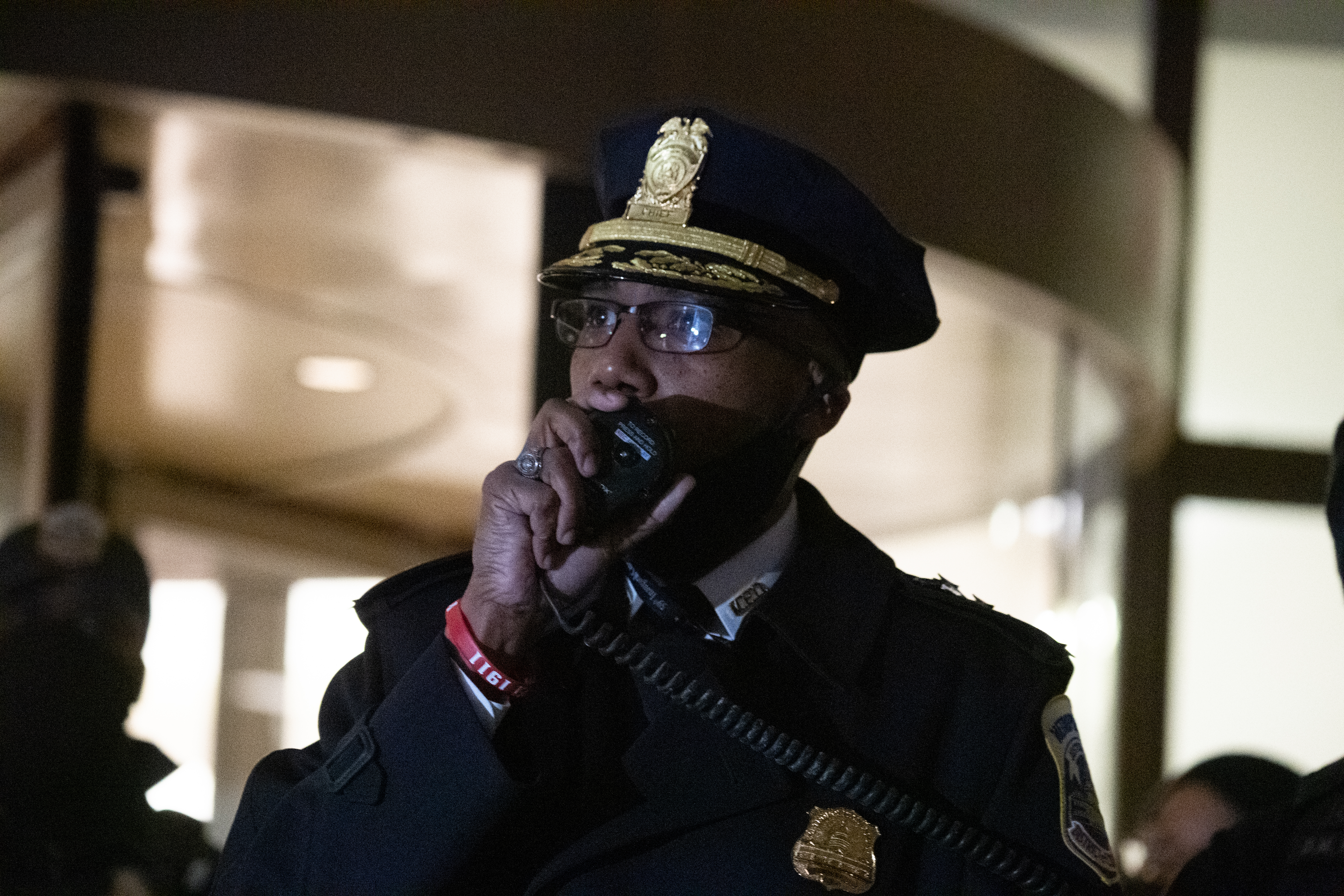
Contee addresses the crowd before the swearing in of Special Deputy U.S. Marshals prior to 2021 presidential inauguration

Contee joined the Metropolitan Police Department as a cadet in 1989, while a senior in high school, and became a sworn officer in 1992. After being first assigned to the Third District he quickly rose through the ranks serving as a sergeant in the Second District and the Metropolitan Police Academy. Contee was promoted to lieutenant and subsequently served as a Patrol Services Area leader in the Second District, was assigned to the Regional Operations Command - North, and lead the intelligence branch. In 2004, Chief Contee was promoted to captain and was tasked with overseeing the Homicide Branch and Sexual Assault Unit.

Contee was promoted to Second District commander in August 2004 and was transferred to the Special Operations Division (SOD) in April 2006, where he was responsible for overseeing tactical patrol, special events and traffic safety functions. Following his post at SOD, Chief Contee became commander of the Sixth District in 2007, before taking command of the Recruiting Division in October 2014. He was named commander of the First District in January 2016, and was appointed Assistant Chief of MPD's Professional Development Bureau in the summer 2016 where he oversaw the Human Resources Management Division, Disciplinary Review Division, the Metropolitan Police Academy, and Recruiting Division. In April 2017, Chief Contee was named Patrol Chief of Patrol Services South (PSS), which included his oversight of the First, Sixth, and Seventh Police Districts.

In March 2018, he was named assistant chief of the Investigative Services Bureau, which includes the Criminal Investigations Division, the Narcotics and Special Investigations Division, the Crime Scene Investigations Division, the Youth and Family Services Division, and the School Safety Division.

Contee was promoted to Chief of Police by DC Mayor Muriel Bowser on January 2, 2021, just four days prior to the attack on the US Capitol Building. Chief Contee serves as a regular as a regular featured speaker at MPD's DC Police Leadership Academy.

On April 26, 2023, Contee announced his retirement from MPD, as he accepted a new position as assistant director of the FBI.

Police appointments
Preceded by Peter Newsham	Chief of the Metropolitan Police Department of the District of Columbia; 2021–2023; Acting: 2021	Succeeded by Ashan M. Benedict; Interim
