= USIS (company) =

U.S. government contractor

US Investigation Services
- Industry: Financial
- Founded: 1996
- Headquarters: Fairfax County, Virginia, U.S.
- Website: www.usis.com

USIS (US Investigation Services) was an American company that provided security-based information and service solutions to both government and corporate customers, in the United States and abroad. Its corporate headquarters were in Fairfax County, Virginia, in Greater Washington, D.C., in the area of Falls Church. Training took place in Boyers, Pennsylvania. USIS was a part of Altegrity Inc., a company headquartered in the Falls Church area that was owned by Providence Equity Partners.

== History ==
USIS was founded in 1996 after the investigative branch, Federal Investigative Service, of the United States Office of Personnel Management (OPM) was privatized. Its creation was due to an effort of Vice President of the United States Al Gore to reduce the size of the civil service. Originally known as US Investigations Services Inc., it was at first an employee-owned company.

The Carlyle Group invested in USIS and in 2003, Welsh, Carson, Anderson & Stowe also committed capital to them. In 2007, Carlyle announced that it would sell USIS to Providence Equity Partners, a private equity firm, for US$1.5 billion.

In the fiscal year 2012, USIS received $253 million for the contract work of the OPM, 67% of the OPM's contract spending for the fiscal year.

== Background checks ==
=== Aaron Alexis background check ===
In 2007, an OPM contract investigator employed by USIS conducted the field work for the OPM-FIS background investigation on Aaron Alexis, who fatally shot 12 people and injured three others in a mass shooting at the headquarters of the Naval Sea Systems Command (NAVSEA) inside the Washington Navy Yard in southeast Washington, D.C. on Monday, September 16, 2013.

=== Edward Snowden investigation ===
In 2011, OPM contract investigators employed by USIS conducted the field work for the OPM security clearance re-investigation on Edward Snowden, who leaked classified documents beginning on June 5, 2013.

On June 18, 2013, the Subcommittee on Efficiency and Effectiveness of Federal Programs and the Federal Workforce and the Subcommittee on Financial and Contracting Oversight, both of the U.S. Senate Homeland Security and Governmental Affairs Committee, held a joint hearing. Michelle B. Schmitz, the OPM assistant inspector general for investigations, testified that USIS had been under investigation since late 2011, stating that it involves a "complicated contract fraud case". Patrick McFarland, the OPM inspector general, did not reveal the reason for the investigation of USIS, and said when asked about Snowden's security clearance re-investigation, "We do believe there may be some problems."

=== USIS response to accusations regarding Alexis and Snowden ===
In a September 8, 2014, media release, the company insisted that, despite being "the target of inaccurate and misleading public allegations", USIS is a responsible government contractor. It labeled as myth reports that USIS botched its field work for OPM background investigations on Aaron Alexis and Edward Snowden, calling the claim "absolutely false". The company asserted that "OPM confirmed in sworn testimony before Congress on February 11, 2014 that the investigative file compiled by USIS on Aaron Alexis 'was complete and in compliance with all investigative standards'". USIS also said it followed all OPM-mandated procedures and protocols in its background investigation of Edward Snowden.

The company further clarified that it "does not grant security clearances and plays no role in making those determinations". The decision to grant or renew a clearance, said USIS, "is the sole responsibility of the federal government agency that requested the background investigation". However, the OPM hired USIS to perform not only background checks but also secondary reviews of those checks to ensure that no one who should not have access to state secrets was overlooked by mistake. While USIS did have staff to review these background investigations and to ensure they met government investigative standards, the federal government and the OPM was still responsible for the adjudication in granting of security clearances.

== Fraud investigation and charges ==
In June 2013, the office of Senator Claire McCaskill stated that USIS was "under active criminal investigation". A statement from USIS stated that it was unaware that it was under criminal investigation. It added that "USIS complied with that subpoena and has cooperated fully with the government's civil investigative efforts". USIS, as the government's primary provider of background checks for the United States, earned $253 million in awards this year alone.

On January 23, 2014, the U.S. Department of Justice filed fraud charges against USIS. The suit was originally filed by a long time USIS employee, whistleblower Blake Percival. The suit, United States of America, ex rel Blake Percival vs USIS alleges that beginning in at least March 2008 and continuing through at least September 2012, USIS management devised and executed a scheme to deliberately circumvent contractually required quality reviews of reports of investigation of completed background investigations in order to increase the company's revenues and profits. USIS responded that the faulty checks "relate to a small group of individuals over a specific time period". In August 2015, Altegrity agreed to forgo $30 million in payments the U.S. government owed to USIS in order to settle the case with the Department of Justice.

=== Cyber attack ===
On July 7, 2014, the company said it was hit by a cyber attack prompting the US government to suspend its work with the firm. Multiple experts including USIS Lead Information Security Engineer John Nolan who have examined the hack "believe it has all the markings of a state-sponsored attack", but did not detail possible suspects. The investigation revealed that the hackers broke into USIS by pivoting from an SAP ERP system managed by a third party.

=== OPM drops USIS ===
On September 9, 2014, the OPM confirmed it would not renew any of its contracts with USIS upon their expiration at month's end. USIS said it was "deeply disappointed with OPM's decision", which affected 3,000 employees handling a caseload that averaged about 21,000 background investigations a month for total fees of $320 million during the last fiscal year.

== Bankruptcy ==
In early 2015, USIS's parent company, Altegrity (also known as Corporate Risk Holdings), filed for bankruptcy.
