= Pamela A. Smith =

Former American police chief (born 1968)

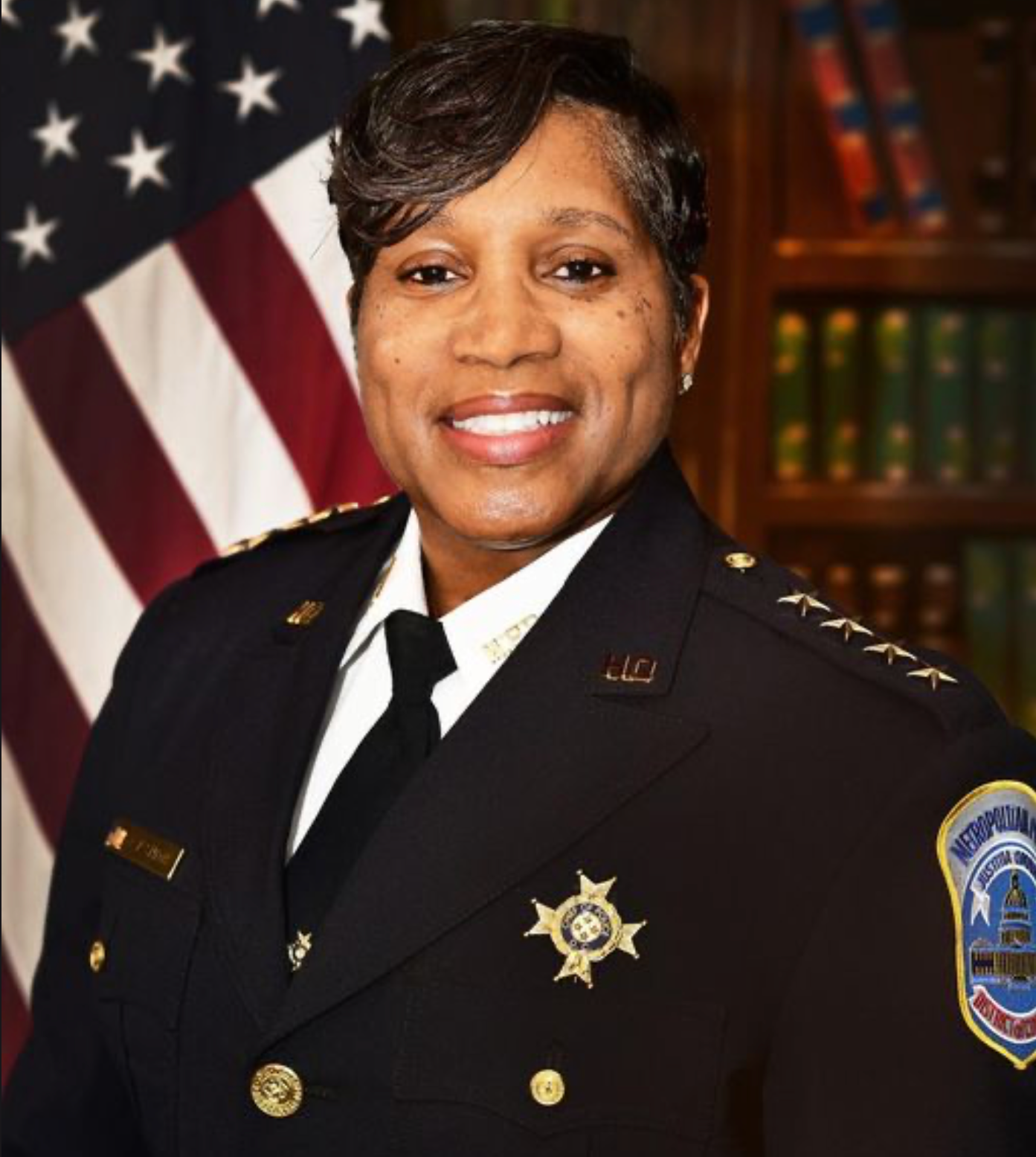
- Official portrait, 2023
- Born: January 4, 1968 (age 58); Pine Bluff, Arkansas, U.S.
- Education: University of Arkansas at Pine Bluff
- Police career
- Allegiance: District of Columbia
- Department: Metropolitan Police Department of the District of Columbia; United States Park Police
- Service years: 1998–present
- Rank: Chief of Police

Pamela A. Smith (born January 4, 1968) is a former American police chief.

Smith joined the United States Park Police in 1998 and advanced through the ranks to become chief of police there from 2021 to 2022. She was the first African-American female to serve in the role.

She joined the Metropolitan Police Department of the District of Columbia in 2022 as its chief equity officer and then served as its chief of police from July 2023 to December 2025.

Smith resigned from the Metropolitan Police Department in 2025 about a week prior to the release of a House Committee on Oversight and Government Reform report that alleged that Smith had intimidated subordinate officers into reporting inaccurately low crime statistics for political reasons.

== Early life and education ==
Smith was born on January 4, 1968, in Pine Bluff, Arkansas to Walter Lee Smith Sr. and Eddie Mae Bass Sanders. Her mother was 16 when she married her father. Smith's mother was addicted to alcohol and her father to drugs. They divorced when Smith was a child. She was briefly in the foster care system. Smith was primarily raised on the east side of Pine Bluff by her mother and grandmother, Ellatrise Bass. She graduated from Pine Bluff High School. Smith ran track in high school and college. She earned a Bachelor of Arts degree in education from the University of Arkansas at Pine Bluff in 1992. She completed a graduate certificate in criminal justice education from the University of Virginia. Smith is a session 265 graduate of the FBI National Academy.

== Career ==
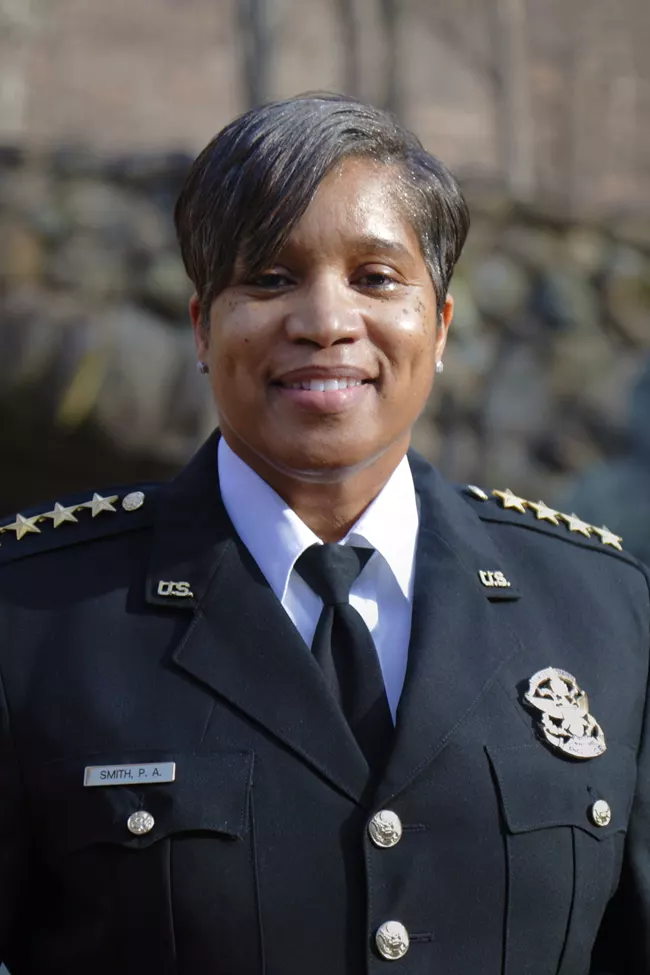
Smith as the United States Park Police Chief in 2021.

After college, Smith moved to New York where she worked as a seasonal park ranger at the Gateway National Recreation Area. She was a social worker on Staten Island working with the foster care system. She later assisted juveniles while working for the New York City Department of Probation. She served as a corrections officer in Manhattan.

=== United States Park Police ===
Smith began her career with the United States Park Police in 1998 as a patrol officer in the San Francisco field office. She was reassigned to the New York field office where she joined the canine unit as a canine handler in the explosive ordinance and detection unit. She was the first woman to lead the New York Field Office as its Major. Smith transitioned to a senior instructor at the Federal Law Enforcement Training Center (FLETC), law enforcement driver training program in Glynco, Georgia. She rose through the ranks as sergeant, lieutenant, captain, major, deputy chief, and acting chief of police in late 2020. She was serving in an acting capacity during the January 6 United States Capitol attack and later testified in the U.S. Senate about the attack. She was promoted to chief of police on February 28, 2021, becoming the first African-American female to serve as chief in the agency's 230-year-old history. She retired on April 30, 2022, and was succeeded by interim chief Christopher Stock.

=== Metropolitan Police Department of the District of Columbia ===
Smith joined the Metropolitan Police Department of the District of Columbia (MPD) in May 2022 as the chief equity officer, assigned to the executive office of the chief of police. She led the department's efforts on diversity, equity and inclusion (DEI). She developed an organizational channel for department-wide accountability by providing strategic advice to the MPD chief of police, executive leadership, and senior management officials within the department. In addition to her DEI focus, she supervised the directorates for employee well-being and support unit and equal employment opportunity office. In April 2023, Smith was promoted to the assistant chief of police, homeland security bureau where she led the operational and administrative functions of the special operations division, joint strategic and tactical analysis command center, and the office of intelligence. In July 2023, mayor Muriel Bowser nominated Smith to serve as the MPD chief of police. She was sworn in later that month in an acting capacity, succeeding interim chief Ashan M. Benedict. The Council of the District of Columbia confirmed her as the new chief in a unanimous vote on November 7, 2023. She was the second female and first Black female to serve in the position.

On December 8, 2025, Smith announced that she would step down from her position on December 31, 2025. About a week after on December 14, the House Committee on Oversight and Government Reform published a report alleging that Smith had intimidated subordinate officers into reporting inaccurately low crime statistics. On December 19, 2025, Smith delivered a speech at her walkout ceremony, stating, “Let’s be really clear about one thing: Never would I, never will I, ever compromise my integrity for a few crime numbers...”. These remarks came amid ongoing public and political scrutiny over the Metropolitan Police Department's crime statistics and internal accountability practices.

== Personal life ==
Smith moved to the Washington metropolitan area in 2011. She is a season ticket holder of the Washington Mystics. As of 2023, she resides in ward 8 of Washington, D.C. She is an ordained Baptist minister.

== See also ==
- Women in policing in the United States

Police appointments
| Preceded by | Chief of the United States Park Police; 2020–2022; Acting: 2020–2021 | Succeeded by Christopher Stock; Interim |
| Preceded by Ashan M. Benedict; Interim | Chief of the Metropolitan Police Department of the District of Columbia; 2023–present Acting: 2023 | Incumbent |
