= Isaac Fulwood =

American police officer

Chief of the Metropolitan Police Department of the District of Columbia
- In office July 1989 – September 1992
- Preceded by: Maurice T. Turner, Jr.
- Succeeded by: Fred Thomas

Personal details
- Born: April 28, 1940 Washington, D.C., U.S.
- Died: September 1, 2017 (aged 77) Washington, D.C., U.S.
- Spouse: Ruth Johnson
- Children: Two
- Education: Eastern High School

Isaac "Ike" Fulwood Jr. (April 28, 1940 – September 1, 2017) was an American police officer who served as the Chief of the Metropolitan Police Department of the District of Columbia from July 1989 until September 1992. Chief Fulwood inherited a city plagued by high crime, a record homicide rate, as well as the height of the crack epidemic. His tenure was also marked by a strained relationship with Mayor Marion Barry, as Barry was arrested on federal drug charges just five months after Fulwood's appointment as police chief.
