= Washington Navy Yard shooting =

2013 mass shooting in Washington, D.C., U.S.

- CCTV footage of Aaron Alexis in building 197 holding a Remington 870 shotgun
- Location: 38°52′28.7″N 76°59′54.7″W; NAVSEA Building 197, Washington Navy Yard, Washington, D.C., U.S.
- Date: September 16, 2013; 13 years ago 8:16 – 9:25 a.m. (EDT; UTC−04:00)
- Attack type: Mass shooting; mass murder; shootout
- Weapons: Sawed-off Remington Model 870 Express Synthetic Tactical 7-Round 12-gauge shotgun; Stolen Beretta M9 9mm semi-automatic pistol
- Deaths: 13 (including the perpetrator)
- Injuries: 8 (3 from gunfire)
- Perpetrator: Aaron Alexis
- Motive: Paranoia

The Washington Navy Yard shooting occurred on September 16, 2013, when 34-year-old Aaron Alexis fatally shot 12 people and injured three others in a mass shooting at the headquarters of the Naval Sea Systems Command (NAVSEA), inside the Washington Navy Yard, in southeast Washington, D.C. The attack took place in the Navy Yard's Building 197; it began around 8:16 a.m. EDT and ended when police killed Alexis around 9:25 a.m. It is the deadliest mass shooting in Washington, D.C. history, as well as the second deadliest mass murder on a U.S. military base, behind the 2009 Fort Hood shooting.

== Events ==
=== Shooting begins ===
Alexis left a Residence Inn Hotel he was booked into on Monday, September 16 and arrived at the Navy Yard in a rented Toyota Prius at around 7:53 a.m., using a valid pass to enter the Yard. As shown on surveillance footage, he entered Building 197 at 8:08 a.m. through the main entrance, carrying a disassembled shotgun (its barrel and stock had been sawed off) in a shoulder bag. He went to the fourth floor, where he had conducted work during the prior week. There, he assembled the shotgun inside a bathroom, then emerged and crossed a hallway into the Building's 4 West area, a cubicle area near the atrium. He began shooting at 8:16 a.m. Six people were hit, five of whom died; the sixth survived wounds to the head and hand. At 8:17 a.m., the first 9-1-1 calls were made.

By 8:20 a.m., Alexis had shot and killed eight people on the fourth floor, and he made his way to the third floor, where he fatally shot two more people within the next two minutes. He also fired at several people on at least five occasions, wounding one woman in the shoulder as she ran up a stairwell. A NAVSEA employee described encountering a gunman wearing all-blue clothing in a third-floor hallway and said that "he just turned and started firing." After firing several shots on the third floor, Alexis went to the first floor.

=== Police response ===
Pentagon Channel report on the event

Officers began arriving at 8:23 a.m. from the D.C. Metropolitan Police Department and several other law enforcement agencies. There are many buildings on the base, however, and officers were unable to discern Building 197's location, so they asked bystanders where it was. They eventually found Building 197 after moving towards the direction from which people were fleeing. There was confusion regarding the shooting also taking place in a nearby building; in reality, a wounded victim had been evacuated from Building 197 and moved to an area near the second building for medical attention. The United States Capitol Police became embroiled in a controversy when the police union accused the agency of ordering its personnel to stand down and not respond to the shooting.

While on the first floor, the shooter moved around randomly before turning around and heading towards the front entrance. He shot and killed Richard Ridgell, the security officer stationed there, and took his 9mm Beretta M9 pistol. Two police officers had asked Ridgell to remain at his post and try to stop the gunman if he attempted to leave the building. The shooter then fired his shotgun at a second security guard and a Navy military police officer at the first-floor atrium, missing both; the security guard fired back and the shooter fled down a hallway. Shortly afterwards, the shooter fired at two police officers and a Naval Criminal Investigative Service agent in another hallway before fleeing again.

At 8:34 a.m., the shooter went towards the west side of the building, where he encountered two men standing at a corner of the building in an alleyway. He tried to fire at them with his shotgun but realized that he was out of ammunition; he switched to the Beretta, killing one of the men, and the other man escaped without injury. Reports indicated that the victim in the alleyway was hit by a "stray bullet". The shooter's use of the pistol in the alleyway led police to initially believe that a second gunman was involved.

=== Death of the shooter ===
After killing his final victim, Alexis moved to a cubicle area where he discarded the shotgun. At the same time, a team of officers entered Building 197, but they became confused after gunshots echoed through the atrium, leading them to believe that he was on an upper floor. They headed up to the second floor while Alexis remained on the first floor. At approximately 8:55 a.m., he went to the third floor and concealed himself inside a bank of cubicles. At 9:12 a.m., two officers and two Naval Criminal Investigative Service (NCIS) agents entered the cubicle area. Alexis opened fire on the two of them, hitting officer Scott Williams in both legs. Officer Emmanuel Smith and NCIS agents Brian Kelley and Ed Martin dragged Williams out of the area and alerted other officers to the shooter's presence. Williams was later taken down to the first floor for medical attention, recovering from his wounds.

At 9:15 a.m., D.C. Police Emergency Response Team officer Dorian DeSantis and U.S. Park Police officers Andrew Wong and Carl Hiott entered the cubicle area and searched the individual banks. Eventually, Alexis jumped out from one of the desks and fired at DeSantis from approximately five feet (1.5 m) away, hitting him twice in his tactical vest, and the three officers returned fire. DeSantis was uninjured by the gunshot. At 9:25 a.m., DeSantis shot Alexis in the head, and his death was confirmed at 11:50 a.m.

=== Victims ===
There were 13 fatalities, including Alexis. He and 11 of the victims were killed at the scene, while Vishnu Pandit, a program manager for the US Navy, later died at George Washington University Hospital. All the victims were civilian employees or contractors, none of them in the military. Eight others were injured, three of them from gunfire. Police officer Scott Williams and two female civilians were wounded by gunfire and were in critical condition at Washington Hospital Center. Wounded victim Jennifer Bennet was shot in the shoulder, chest and thumb, and her arm is now attached to her shoulder by a metal plate and ten metal screws.

The victims' names and ages were:

Name	Age
Michael Arnold	59
Martin Bodrog	54
Arthur Daniels	51
Sylvia Fraser	53
Kathleen Gaarde	62
John Roger Johnson	73
Mary Frances Knight	51
Frank Kohler	50
Vishnu Pandit	61
Kenneth Bernard Proctor	46
Gerald Read	58
Richard Michael Ridgell	52

== Perpetrator ==
Aaron Alexis
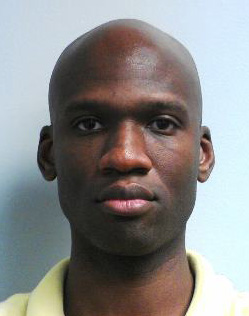
- Born: May 9, 1979; Queens, New York City, U.S.
- Died: September 16, 2013 (aged 34); Washington, D.C., U.S.
- Cause of death: Gunshot wound
- Occupations: Civilian contractor, U.S. Navy sailor

Aaron Alexis was born on May 9, 1979, in the New York City borough of Queens. He grew up in Brooklyn and was a resident of Fort Worth, Texas. He joined the Navy in May 2007 and served in Fleet Logistics Support Squadron 46 at Naval Air Station Joint Reserve Base Fort Worth. His rating was aviation electrician's mate, and he had attained the rank of petty officer third class when he was honorably discharged from the Navy on January 31, 2011, albeit the Navy originally intended for him to receive a general discharge.

According to a Navy official, Alexis was cited on at least eight occasions for misconduct. In September 2010, he was arrested in Fort Worth for discharging a firearm within city limits. He was also arrested in 2004 in Seattle, Washington, for malicious mischief after shooting out the tires of another man's vehicle in what he described as an anger-fueled "blackout", and for disorderly conduct in 2008 in DeKalb County, Georgia. None of his arrests led to prosecution.

=== Professional work ===
Alexis received a secret-level security clearance in March 2008 that was valid for ten years. Following the Navy Yard shooting, it was found that the federal personnel report, which led to the clearance's approval, did not mention that his 2004 arrest had involved a firearm. Alexis said on his clearance application that he had never been charged with a felony and that he had not been arrested in the last seven years; the personnel report said that he had given these answers because the 2004 charge had been dismissed. This security clearance investigation was conducted by USIS, the same contractor that had vetted Edward Snowden. The Department of Justice has filed fraud charges against USIS in a whistleblower case filed as United States of America ex rel. Blake Percival vs USIS.

Alexis worked in Japan from September 2012 to January 2013 on the Navy Marine Corps Intranet network for an HP Enterprise Services sub-contracting company called The Experts. After returning from Japan, he expressed frustration to a former roommate that he had not been paid properly for the work that he performed. Another roommate said that he would frequently complain about being the victim of discrimination. In July 2013, he resumed working for The Experts in the United States.

Alexis was working on a bachelor's degree in aeronautics from Embry–Riddle Aeronautical University, Worldwide. He was Buddhist.

=== Mental health issues ===
After the Navy Yard shooting, the media speculated that Alexis had appeared to be suffering from mental illness. The media reported that Alexis had filed a police report in Rhode Island on August 2, 2013. He claimed to be the victim of harassment and that he was hearing voices in his head. According to an FBI official after the shooting, Alexis was under the "belief that he was being controlled or influenced by extremely low-frequency electromagnetic waves". A message later obtained by federal authorities from Alexis's personal computing devices said, "Ultra low frequency attack is what I've been subject to for the last 3 months. And to be perfectly honest, that is what has driven me to this."

On August 4, 2013, naval police were called to Alexis's hotel at Naval Station Newport and found that he had "taken apart his bed, believing someone was hiding under it, and observed that Alexis had taped a microphone to the ceiling to record the voices of people that were following him". At the time of the incident, he was working for the contractor at the base.

On August 23, Alexis showed up at a Providence, Rhode Island, emergency room complaining of insomnia. He was prescribed 50 milligrams of trazodone, a serotonin antagonist and reuptake inhibitor antidepressant. Five days later, he sought treatment for insomnia in the emergency room of a VA medical center in Washington, D.C., where he told doctors he was not depressed and was not thinking of harming others. He was given ten more tablets of trazodone.

=== Prior to the shooting ===
At the time of the shooting, Alexis had been working for a subcontractor on a Hewlett-Packard Enterprise Services contract supporting a Navy-Marine Corps (NMCI) computer network. Alexis arrived in the Washington, D.C., area on or around August 25, 2013, and stayed at various hotels to escape the voices. At the time of the massacre, he had been staying with five other civilian contractors at the Residence Inn hotel he booked into in southwest Washington, D.C., since September 7.

On Saturday, September 14, two days before the massacre, Alexis visited the Sharpshooters Small Arms Range in Lorton, Virginia, 15 miles (24 km) south of Washington. He tested an AR-15 semiautomatic rifle but did not seek to buy it, a lawyer for the store said. After testing the rifle, Alexis inquired about buying a handgun at the store, but was told federal law does not allow dealers to sell such guns directly to out-of-state customers. Alexis instead purchased a Remington Model 870 Express Tactical 12-gauge shotgun and two boxes of shells, after passing a state and federal background check. Before the shooting, Alexis sawed off the shotgun and scratched the phrases "Better off this way!", "My ELF weapon!", "Not what yall [sic] say!", and "End to the torment!" onto the gun's receiver.

== Aftermath ==
=== Reports of other shooters ===
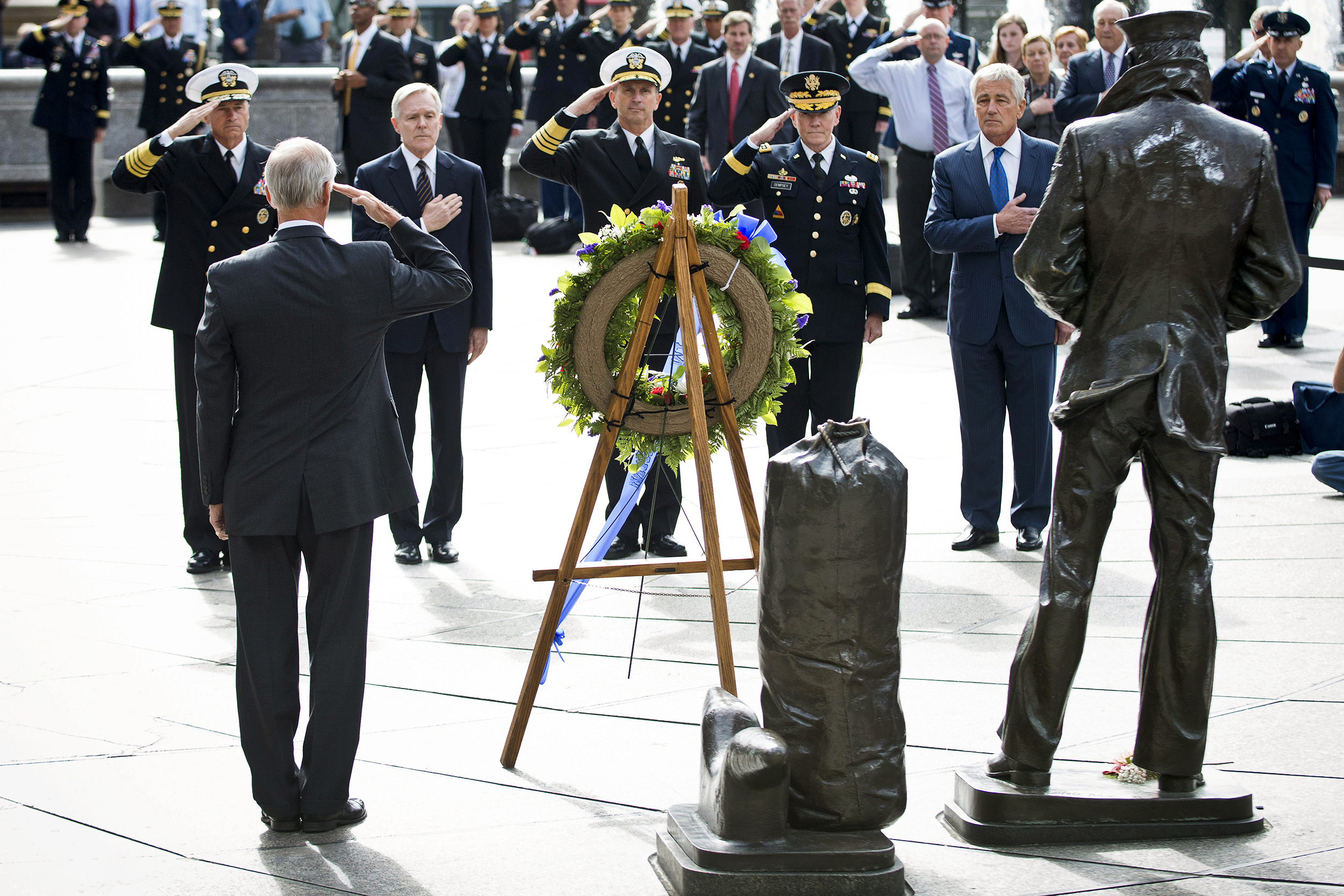
Defense Secretary Chuck Hagel and others lay a wreath at the Navy Memorial on September 17 in honor of the victims.

On the day of the shooting, Washington Chief of Police Cathy L. Lanier initially said that police were searching for a white male wearing khaki military fatigues and a beret, who had allegedly been seen with a handgun, and a black male wearing olive military fatigues and carrying a long gun. The white male was later identified and deemed not to be a suspect. The black male was not identified. At 7:00 p.m., officials ruled out the possibility of another shooter, but were still seeking one other person for possible involvement.

=== Security precautions ===
On September 16, many roadways and bridges were temporarily closed, and flights out of Ronald Reagan Washington National Airport were temporarily suspended. Eight schools were locked down, with the closest, Brent Elementary School, being locked down until 1 PM. Shortly after 3:00 p.m., United States Senate buildings went on lock-down for about an hour "out of an abundance of caution", according to the Senate Sergeant at Arms. The Washington Nationals baseball team postponed their scheduled evening game, owing to the proximity of Nationals Park to the Navy Yard area (the facilities are close enough to share a Metro station).

The Navy Yard reopened and resumed usual operations on September 19, 2013. Building 197 reopened on February 2, 2015. In October 2013, the Navy announced a repair-and-restoration contract for the building; the contract indicated that "the repairs shall be done in a manner that changes the feel, finish, appearance and layout of the space, creating a different sense of place and mitigating the psychological and emotional impacts that the facility itself could have on returning occupants". The building, renamed after Joshua Humphreys, reopened in 2015. The renovations, costing approximately $44 million, include a reflection area and new visitors' entrance, new flooring, furnishings, and an updated cafeteria.

== Reactions ==
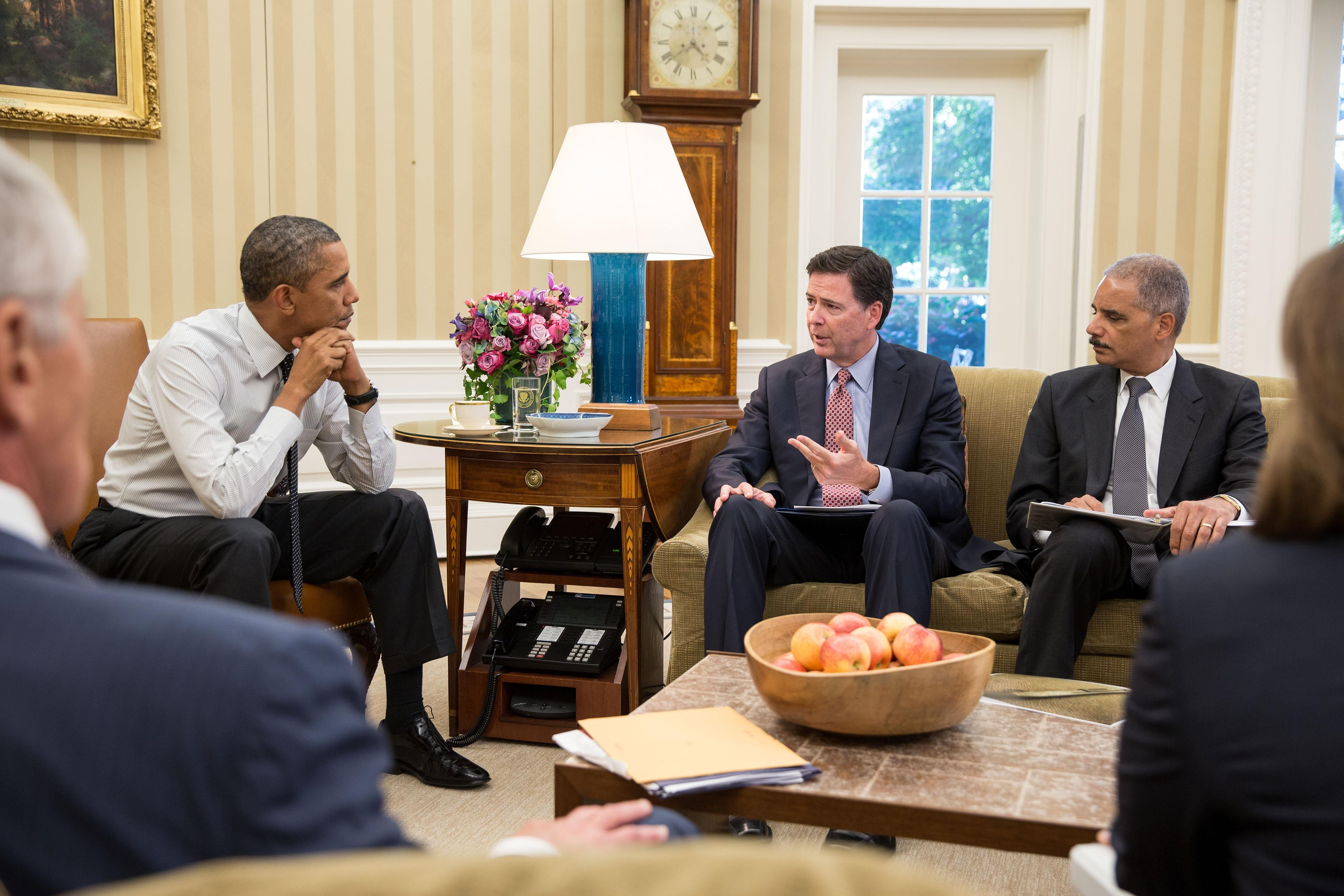
President Obama receives an update on the investigation of the shooting from FBI Director James Comey, left, and Attorney General Eric Holder in the Oval Office on September 17, 2013.

Shortly after news of the shooting broke, United States President Barack Obama pledged to ensure the perpetrators would be held responsible. Obama ordered flags at the White House, all public buildings and all military and naval posts, stations and vessels to be flown at half-staff until sunset on September 20. On September 17, Department of Defense officials laid a wreath at the Navy Memorial plaza in honor of the victims. In the wake of the shooting, President Obama called on Congress to revisit gun control legislation. On September 22, he attended a memorial service for the victims.

The shooting sparked a discussion on the adequacy of security at U.S. military facilities. On September 18, Defense Secretary Chuck Hagel ordered a review of security procedures at military facilities around the world. Foreign Policy magazine reported that virtually anyone with a Common Access Card (C.A.C.), provided to government contractors, civilian Defense Department employees, and soldiers, can enter many military facilities "without being patted down or made to go through a metal detector". The shooter had a Secret-level security clearance and a C.A.C. allowing him to enter the Navy Yard. Conservative commentators including Alex Jones, Ted Nugent, and others suggested that "gun-free zones" on military bases were to blame for the massacre. On NBC's Meet the Press, National Rifle Association of America leader Wayne LaPierre said, "when the good guys with guns got there, it stopped." In the libertarian Reason magazine, J.D. Tuccille said that on domestic U.S. military bases, most soldiers are prohibited from carrying guns, and that this made the base more vulnerable to an attack.

On September 17, gun control activists and relatives of victims of shootings that occurred at Sandy Hook Elementary School; Aurora, Colorado; and the Wisconsin Sikh temple shooting, came to Washington to protest for stricter gun control. The activists said they hoped that the Navy Yard attack's proximity to Capitol Hill would motivate lawmakers to act to impose stricter background checks and close the gun show loophole.

On September 25, 2013, Hewlett Packard fired the computer firm The Experts, which employed the shooter, over "its failure to respond appropriately" to the Washington Navy Yard shooter's mental health issues.

On October 31 and December 17, 2013, the Senate's Committee on Homeland Security and Governmental Affairs held hearings examining government clearances, background checks, and physical security for federal facilities in the wake of the shootings.

On February 20, 2014, a ceremony was held to honor the over 170 law enforcement officers, including 57 D.C. Metropolitan Police officers, who responded and entered the building to search for the shooter. Specifically, MPD Officers Scott Williams and Dorian DeSantis were given the Medal of Valor, U.S. Park Police Medal of Honor, and the Blue Badge Medal for their roles during the gun battle.

On December 19, 2014, President Obama signed a bill authorizing the establishment of a memorial to the shooting. A remembrance wall was dedicated the following February.

== See also ==
- 2019 Virginia Beach shooting
- Gun violence in the United States
- Mass shootings in the United States
- List of rampage killers (workplace killings)
