= Blake Percival =

Corporate whistleblower

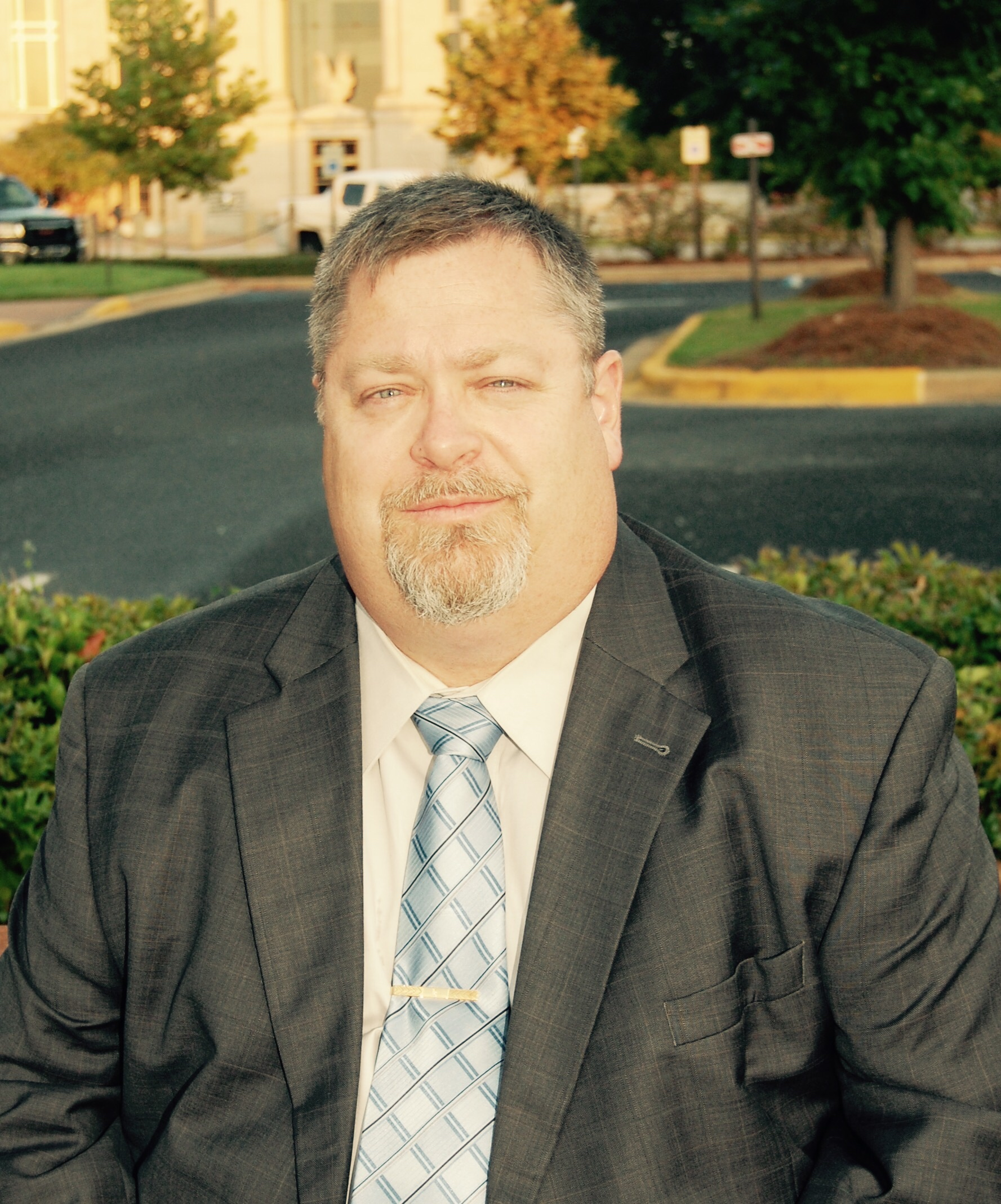
- Born: Panama City, Florida
- Education: Bluefield State College (BA, 2000)
- Alma mater: Bluefield State College
- Occupation(s): Criminal justice professional, public speaker
- Years active: 2001-2011
- Employer: USIS
- Known for: Director of Field Work Services for USIS; Whistleblower
- Spouse: Melanie Lynn Percival
- Children: Sandra Lynn Percival, Bradley Travis Percival, Lynda Ashley Hotard, Artie Blake Percival

Blake Percival was the director of fieldwork services, Western Pennsylvania (WPA), for USIS. He became a whistleblower in July 2011, when he filed a qui tam suit saying he was fired from USIS, for not ordering his subordinates to submit cases to the U.S. government for payment, that had not been completed. He had worked for USIS from January 2001 to June 2011. In his suit he stated he had been fired after he refused to order his employees to continue an elaborate fraud known as dumping.

The suit was filed under seal in U.S. District Court in Montgomery, Alabama. His allegations were investigated by the U.S. Department of Justice (DOJ) and in October 2013 the DOJ joined Percival's suit and removed the seal. The case, United States of America ex rel. Blake Percival v. U.S. Investigations Services, Civil Action No. 11-CV-527-WKW, was filed in U.S. District Court, Middle District of Alabama (Northern Division). On January 22, 2014, the DOJ filed their formal complaint against USIS. In their filing the DOJ stated that USIS committed fraud on at least 665,000 background investigations. This case was moved to Washington, D.C., on April 25, 2014. The case was settled on August 19, 2015, when USIS agreed to forgo claims to more than $30,000,000 it was owed by the U.S. Government. On December 18, 2015, the Department of Justice awarded Percival 20%, just over $6,000,000, of the money recovered from USIS.

== Education ==
Percival graduated from Bluefield State College in January 2000 with a Regents Bachelor of Arts Degree.

He graduated from the West Virginia State Police Academy in April 1994 as part of the 86th Basic Class, which certified him as a police officer in West Virginia. He graduated from the Montgomery Police Academy's lateral training class in 1998, which certified him as a police officer in Alabama.

In 2008, he was licensed as a private investigator by the State of Minnesota Board of Private Detective and Protective Agent Services. In April 2013, he was certified in Alabama as a magistrate by the Alabama Judicial College.

== Early career ==
From February 1986 to March 1992 Percival served in the U.S. Army. While in the Army he worked as a material control accounting specialist for four years and as a military police officer for two years. He was assigned at Fort Ord, California, Fort Rucker, Alabama, and Fuerth, Germany. In March 1992 he was honorably discharged at the rank of sergeant.

From 1994 to 2001, Percival worked as a police officer. He held police officer positions in West Virginia and Alabama. In West Virginia he worked at Beckley Police Department, and in Alabama he worked at Baptist Health Police Department, Auburn University at Montgomery, (A.U.M.) Police Department, and Wetumpka Police Department. He also worked as a bailiff at the City of Montgomery Alabama Municipal Court.

=== USIS ===
In 2001, Percival began working for U.S. Investigations Services which was later renamed USIS. From 2001 to 2003, he was an investigator conducting background investigations for the United States Office of Personnel Management, (OPM). In 2003 he was promoted to district manager and managed investigators in the Fayetteville, North Carolina, area. In 2005, he was reassigned as a team leader for investigators in the Montgomery, Alabama, area. In 2007 he was promoted to district manager of the Minneapolis District. In January 2011 he was promoted to director of fieldwork services, Western Pennsylvania. He was fired from USIS in June 2011.

=== After USIS ===
From September 2011 to October 2013, Percival worked for CACI as an investigator conducting background investigations for the United States Office of Personnel Management, (OPM). From April 2012 to August 2015 he worked as a magistrate at the City of Montgomery Alabama’s Municipal Court.

After his whistleblower case settled, Percival became a public speaker on the topics of morals and ethics. In April 2017, he became a member of the Washington, D.C.–based law firm ProtectUS Law, which specializes in whistleblower cases. Percival's book Holding on to Integrity and Paying the Price: A Whistleblower's Story was published January 6, 2020.

== See also ==
- List of whistleblowers
