= Cathy Lanier =

American police chief

Cathy L. Lanier
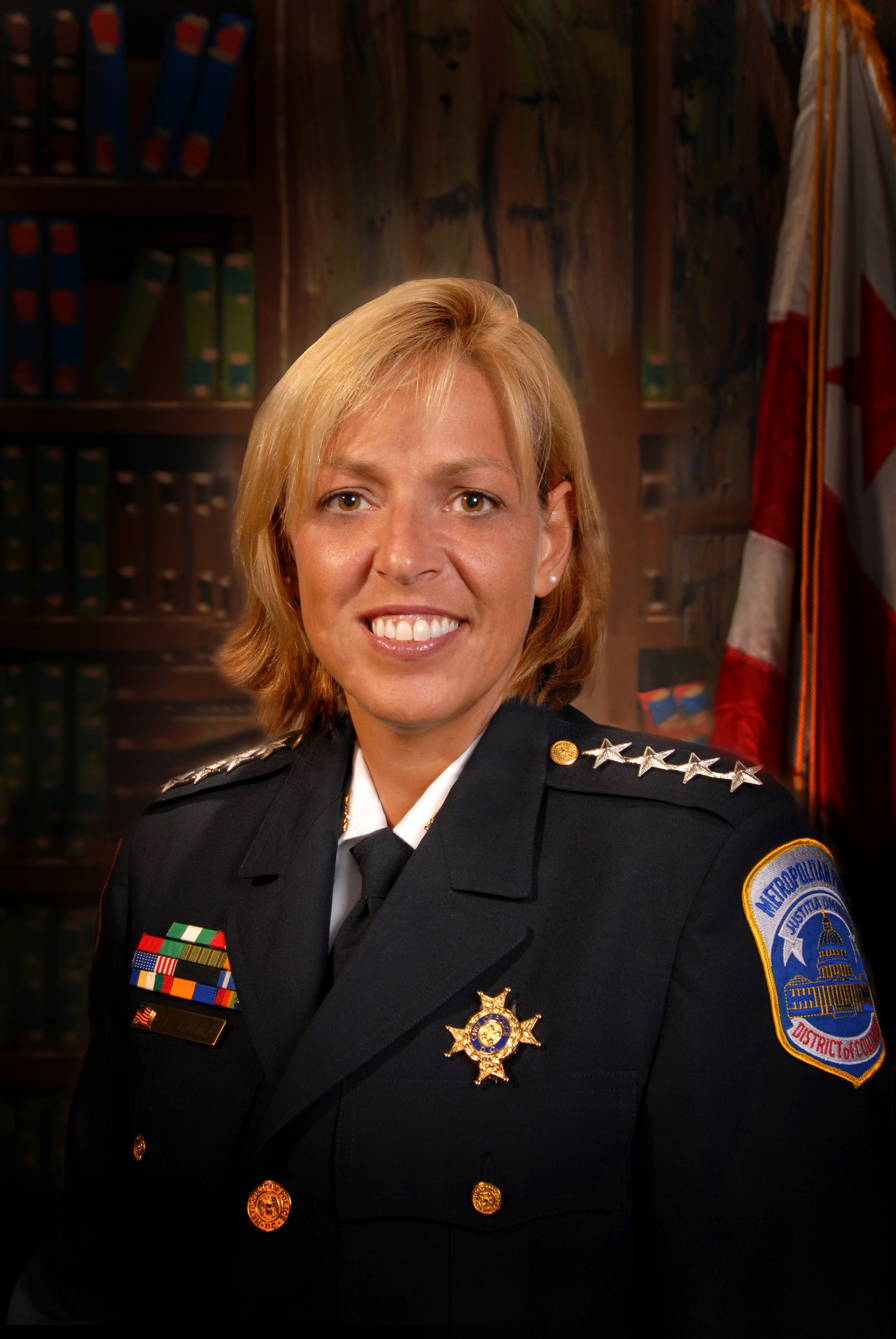
- Lanier in August 2007
- Born: July 22, 1967 (age 59); Tuxedo, Maryland, U.S.
- Education: Johns Hopkins University
- Police career
- Country: United States of America
- Allegiance: District of Columbia
- Department: Metropolitan Police Department of the District of Columbia
- Service years: 1990–2016
- Status: Retired
- Rank: 1990: Sworn in as an officer; 1994: Sergeant; 1996: Lieutenant; 1998: Captain; 1999: Inspector; 2000: Commander; 2007: Chief of Police
- Other work: NFL Head of Security

Cathy Lynn Lanier (born July 22, 1967) is a former chief of the Metropolitan Police Department of the District of Columbia (MPDC). Lanier was appointed by Washington, D.C. Mayor Adrian Fenty in January 2007, replacing outgoing police chief Charles H. Ramsey. She is the first woman to hold the position. In May 2012, Mayor Vincent C. Gray agreed to retain Lanier as police chief under a new five-year contract. Lanier accepted a third appointment from Mayor Muriel Bowser in 2016, making her the first chief of police in MPD history to serve three mayors. Violent crime dropped 23 percent over the years Lanier was chief, and homicides plunged to a half-century low in 2012. On August 16, 2016, it was announced that Lanier had accepted a position as the senior vice president of security with the National Football League. Her last day as police chief was September 15, 2016, when she was succeeded by her deputy, Peter Newsham. Lanier was the longest serving Chief of Police in the history of the Metropolitan Police Department of the District of Columbia.

== Early life and education ==
Lanier was raised in suburban Tuxedo, Maryland, on the northeast edge of the District of Columbia in Prince George's County, Maryland.

Lanier had a challenging childhood. Her father abandoned her family when she was two. When she was 14, she was impregnated by a 26-year-old man (in a case of statutory rape), who then proposed marriage to her. She dropped out of high school at 15 and became a mother soon after. She later married the father of her child, with the permission of her father, which her father granted, according to Lanier, in part to reduce his own child support payment to Lanier's mother. After her husband left her, she raised her son as a single mother, with help from church assistance, food stamps, and other welfare programs. She earned a GED and Associate's degree from the University of the District of Columbia.

Lanier received both Bachelor of Science and Master of Science degrees in management from Johns Hopkins University and holds a Master of Arts in national security studies from the Naval Postgraduate School in Monterey, California; her thesis was Preventing Terror Attacks in the Homeland: A New Mission for State and Local Police. She attended an executive education program at Harvard Kennedy School.

== Career ==
Lanier had joined the Metropolitan Police Department of the District of Columbia in 1990 as a foot patrolman. In 1994, she was promoted to Sergeant and, two years later, a Lieutenant, before becoming a patrol supervisor. In 1999, she became a Captain and, later that year, was promoted to Inspector and placed in charge of the Department's Major Narcotics Branch/Gang Crime Unit. In August 2000, she was promoted to Commander-in-Charge of the Fourth District of the city. In April 2006, she became the Commander at the Office of Homeland Security and Counter-terrorism, Office of the Chief of Police in MPDC, overseeing, among other things, the bomb squad and the emergency response team.

Lanier was criticized in July 2009 after claiming that motorists who used GPS navigation and smartphones to avoid traffic cameras were employing a "cowardly tactic".

Lanier has defended the practice of arresting individuals reselling tickets to sporting events, even if the tickets were sold at face value. The tactic has led to the arrest of out of town visitors who had extra tickets to see the Washington Nationals.

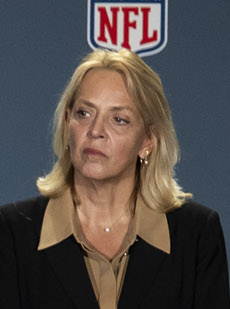
Cathy Lanier in New Orleans in February 2025

She retired from the Metropolitan Police Department in September 2016 to become the head of security of the National Football League.

Police appointments
Preceded by Charles H. Ramsey	Chief of the Metropolitan Police Department of the District of Columbia	Succeeded by Peter Newsham
