= Council on Criminal Justice =

American public safety think tank

- Established: 2019; 7 years ago
- Type: Think tank
- Legal status: Active
- Purpose: Criminal justice research and policy
- Headquarters: Washington D.C.
- Location: USA
- Region served: USA
- Website: counciloncj.org

The Council on Criminal Justice ("CCJ" or "the Council") is an American think tank and invitational membership organization focused on public safety and criminal justice. Nonpartisan and independent, the Council conducts research to establish key facts about crime and justice and convenes prominent government and community leaders to seek consensus on strategic policy roadmaps. The Council's boards and members comprise a cross-section of leaders and experts from law enforcement, courts, corrections, community organizations, advocacy, and academia, as well as formerly incarcerated people, crime victims and survivors, and others affected by the criminal justice system.

== Founding ==
The Council on Criminal Justice was established as a 501(c)(3) nonprofit organization in 2019 by Adam Gelb, who previously worked on criminal justice policy as a journalist, senior state government official, U.S. Senate Judiciary Committee staffer, local program provider, and director of public safety initiatives at The Pew Charitable Trusts. Based in the United States, the Council is founded on the belief that “a fair and effective criminal justice system is essential to democracy and a core measure of America's well-being.”

== Membership and Leadership ==
Council membership is by invitation; members are nominated and seconded by current CCJ members, vetted by a membership committee, and elected by the Board of Directors. Membership is for life, and removal happens only by resignation or action of the board. As of late 2025, the Council had roughly 350 elected members.

The Council is led by Gelb and guided by two boards. The 14-member governing Board of Directors is led by chair Diane Williams, president emeritus of the nonprofit Safer Foundation, and vice-chair Timothy Head, president and CEO of Unify.US. Laurie O. Robinson, an American scholar and public servant, was the Council's founding board chair. The advisory Board of Trustees includes former U.S. Attorney General Alberto Gonzales, former U.S. Deputy Attorney General Sally Yates, former Philadelphia Mayor Michael Nutter, Campaign Zero Co-founder DeRay Mckesson, Harris County (TX) Sheriff Ed Gonzalez, former Deputy Assistant to President Trump Ja’Ron Smith, former California Chief Justice Tani Cantil-Sakauye, and former California Governor Jerry Brown.

== Activities ==
Through its think tank and membership components, the Council convenes independent, ideologically diverse task forces to study criminal justice issues and provide research and policy recommendations for use by lawmakers, criminal justice practitioners, advocates, journalists, and others. It also conducts original research and syntheses and translates existing research to facilitate understanding by policymakers and the public.

Task forces include:

=== Task Force on Federal Priorities ===
CCJ established the Task Force on Federal Priorities in June 2019 to build on policies adopted under the federal First Step Act. The task force, chaired by former Georgia Governor Nathan Deal, developed 15 consensus recommendations, from revising sentencing for drug offenses and acquitted conduct to the functioning of federal prisons and support for successful reentry. Reflecting one proposal to create a federal grant program to help high-violence cities, Congress in 2022 passed the Bipartisan Safer Communities Act, the most significant anti-violence legislation in 30 years. The VOCA Fix to Sustain the Crime Victims Fund Act of 2021 also aligned with a task force recommendation urging Congress to ensure the long-term solvency of the fund.

=== National Commission on COVID-19 and Criminal Justice ===
Established in July 2020 as corrections agencies, law enforcement, courts, and community organizations grappled with impacts of the COVID pandemic, the commission assessed the impact of COVID-19 on the justice system, proposed strategies to limit viral outbreaks, tracked rapidly changing crime patterns, and recommended multiple policy changes to better balance public health and safety. Two former U.S. Attorneys General, Alberto Gonzales and Loretta Lynch, co-chaired the commission.

=== Task Force on Policing ===
In the wake of George Floyd's killing by Minneapolis police officer Derek Chauvin and a wave of nationwide protests, CCJ in November 2020 launched the Task Force on Policing. The panel's mission was to identify the policies and practices most likely to reduce violent encounters between officers and the public and improve the fairness and effectiveness of American policing. Members agreed on five priorities for the federal, state, and local level, including the development of national training standards, establishment of a federal decertification registry, and the adoption of duty-to-intervene policies. The Crime Lab at the University of Chicago's Harris School of Public Policy served as research partner for the panel.

=== Violent Crime Working Group ===
In July 2021 CCJ established the Violent Crime Working Group after violent crime, particularly homicide, rose rapidly in U.S. cities beginning early in the COVID-19 pandemic. The group summarized the best available evidence about law enforcement and community-based violence reduction strategies and identified 10 actions most likely to make the greatest immediate impact on reducing gun violence. In December 2023, the U.S. Department of Justice released a “Violent Crime Reduction Roadmap” based on the 10 essential actions report.

=== Health and Reentry Project ===
In 2022, the Council partnered with Viaduct Consulting and Waxman Strategies to create the Health and Reentry Project, an initiative to improve health care for incarcerated people before their release from prison or jail. The project spun off into a separate organization, which is led by Vikki Wachino, former Deputy Administrator of the Centers for Medicare & Medicaid Services.

=== Task Force on Long Sentences ===
In April 2022, CCJ established the Task Force on Long Sentences to examine how long prison terms affect public safety, crime victims and survivors, incarcerated people and their families, communities, and correctional staff. The panel produced 14 recommendations to enhance judicial discretion in sentencing, promote individual and system accountability, reduce racial and ethnic disparities, better serve victims of crime, and increase public safety. The task force was led by co-chairs Trey Gowdy, a former congressman from South Carolina, and Sally Yates, former U.S. Deputy Attorney General.

=== Veterans Justice Commission ===
CCJ's Veterans Justice Commission examined why so many military veterans are landing in prison and jail and produced 11 recommendations for policy changes to address the problem. Launched in August 2022, the commission was chaired by former U.S. Defense Secretary and U.S. Senator Chuck Hagel and included former Defense Secretary and White House Chief of Staff Leon Panetta. Following the commission's work, multiple states began to reexamine how they manage veterans whose criminal behavior is influenced by their military service, with Nebraska becoming the first of several states that have passed legislation based on a model policy developed by the panel. The commission also worked with the Second Chance Business Coalition, Business Roundtable, Society for Human Resource Management, JPMorgan Chase, and others to create a model corporate policy to increase hiring of veterans who have been involved in the justice system.

=== Crime Trends Working Group ===
In April 2023, CCJ established the Crime Trends Working Group to research crime trends and recommend improvements in the nation's capacity to produce timely, accurate, and complete crime data. The FBI has implemented two recommendations from the group: starting publication of monthly crime trends reports and capturing trends in non-fatal shootings. The group was chaired by John Roman, Senior Fellow and Director, Center on Public Safety and Justice, NORC at the University of Chicago, who took over after the passing of the group's founding chair, Richard Rosenfeld, Curators’ Distinguished Professor Emeritus, Department of Criminology and Criminal Justice, University of Missouri-St. Louis.

=== Women's Justice Commission ===
In July 2024, the Council launched a Women's Justice Commission to document the distinct challenges affecting women in the justice system and recommend reforms to enhance safety, health, and justice. The commission's first policy recommendations, released in October 2025, call for prioritizing alternatives to arrest for women who do not pose a risk to public safety, basing pretrial detention decisions on public safety and flight risk, and expanding consideration of women's distinct circumstances at charging and sentencing. The commission is chaired by former U.S. Attorney General Loretta Lynch. Oklahoma First Lady Sarah Stitt is Senior Adviser.

=== Task Force on Artificial Intelligence ===
The Council launched the Task Force on Artificial Intelligence in June 2025 to develop standards and evidence-based recommendations to guide the safe, ethical, and effective use of AI in the criminal justice system. Its first set of five guiding principles was released in October 2025. Former Texas Supreme Court Chief Justice Nathan Hecht chairs the task force, which includes 14 other leaders representing AI technology developers and researchers, police executives and other criminal justice practitioners, civil rights advocates, community leaders, and formerly incarcerated people. The initiative is supported by researchers at RAND.

Beyond its task forces and commissions, the Council conducts several other research and policy initiatives.

==== Crime and Corrections Trends ====
CCJ began producing analyses of crime trends in mid-2020 as the nation experienced the effects of a COVID pandemic, the police killing of Floyd, and nationwide protests. Mid-year and annual reports examine violent and nonviolent offenses in a cross-section of cities that consistently publish monthly crime data, allowing policymakers and the public to assess crime trends in near real-time. The findings are routinely cited by media. The Council also produces city-level fact sheets and in-depth examinations of specific offenses.

Separately, the Council regularly updates a compendium of data on crime, victimization, arrests, jails, prisons, probation, and parole called “The Footprint.” On the 25th anniversary of the Violent Crime Control and Law Enforcement Act of 1994, commonly known as the 1994 Crime Bill, CCJ released a report examining the impact the bill had on prison populations, sentencing, law enforcement, and immigration.

==== Racial Disparities ====
The Council's Pushing Toward Parity project examines racial and ethnic disparities in the criminal justice system in an attempt to understand what influences them. Analyses from the project investigate national imprisonment trends by race and sex, assess the impact of sentencing law change on disparity trends in 12 states, examine imprisonment trends among female populations by race and ethnicity, and explore how differing measurement of Hispanic ethnicity affects understanding of disparity trends in imprisonment.

==== First Step Act ====
In 2023, CCJ released a set of analyses examining the effects of the bipartisan First Step Act. The research explores the act's impact on recidivism rates and compares the amount of federal prison time served by those released before and after the act took effect.

==== Building Common Ground ====
As part of its work building common ground for improvements to the criminal justice system, CCJ's Centering Justice initiative seeks to bridge the ideological divide by fostering conversations grounded in data, lived and professional experience, and shared values. The initiative is led by CCJ Director of Engagement and Partnerships Khalil Cumberbatch and Chief Policy Counsel Marc A. Levin. One of its key projects was facilitating discussions that led to agreement on a set of four bipartisan principles for criminal justice policy, signed in January 2025 by 14 national advocacy organizations that span the ideological spectrum. The groups include the Conservative Political Action Conference and the American Legislative Exchange Council on the right and the American Civil Liberties Union and the Leadership Conference on Civil and Human Rights on the left.

==== Analyzing Federal Justice Funding ====
Amid the second Trump Administration's efforts to increase government efficiency, CCJ launched a project to increase public understanding of how the federal government allocates billions of taxpayer dollars for a vast array of criminal justice programs. The effort, called Justice in Perspective, is led by CCJ Senior Fellow Amy Solomon, who served as Assistant Attorney General of the Office of Justice Programs, the U.S. Department of Justice's grantmaking agency.

== Funding and Support ==
The Council does not receive government funding. It has received support from a broad range of institutional and individual donors interested in using data and evidence to shape policy and building common ground to solve problems. Current and past donors include Arnold Ventures, Bank of America, HBO, LinkedIn, the MacArthur Foundation, the National Football League, the Pew Charitable Trusts, and Stand Together.
