= Richard H. Sylvester (writer) =

American journalist

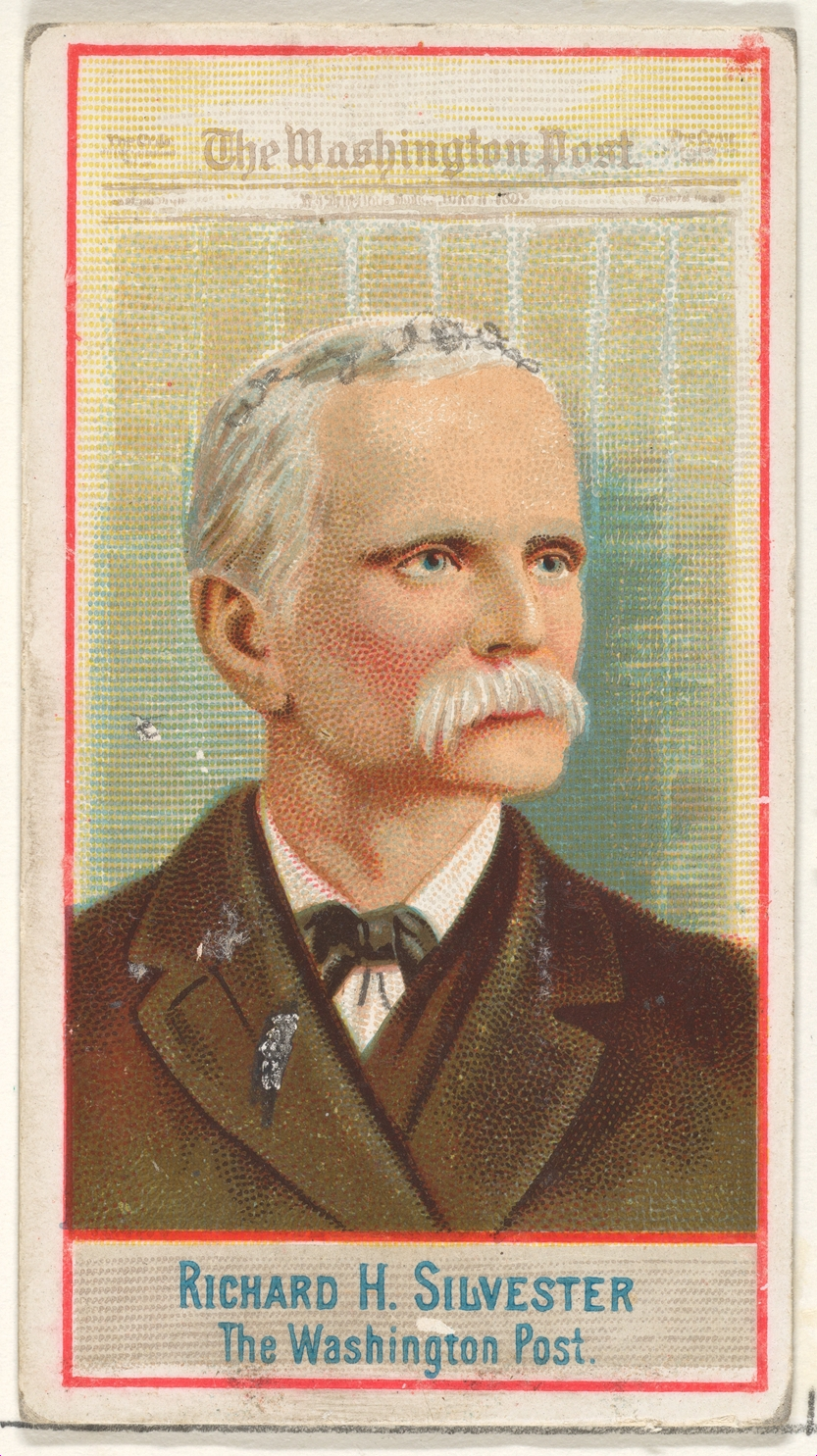
- Born: April 17, 1830; Charlestown, New Hampshire, U.S.
- Died: September 2, 1895 (aged 65)
- Education: Yale College; University of Michigan Law School
- Occupation: Journalist

Richard H. Sylvester, Sr. (April 17, 1830 – September 2, 1895) was one of the pioneer journalists of Iowa.

== Biography ==
He was born in Charlestown, New Hampshire on April 17, 1830 to Henry H. Sylvester and Elizabeth Hubbard.

He attended school at Phillips Exeter Academy, enrolled at Yale College with the Class of 1851 but left at the end of his sophomore year, and graduated at the Law School of Ann Arbor. In 1854, he came to Iowa and continued his law studies with Judge James Grant and John F. Dillon at Davenport. In 1855, he went to Iowa City and reported the proceedings of the general assembly.

Later he established the Iowa City State Reporter, a Democratic paper. He was chosen superintendent of schools in Johnson County, Iowa and founded the Iowa State Press, after conducting it several years sold it to John P. Irish. During the Civil War, he was a war correspondent of the New York World. In 1862, he was nominated by the Democratic party for Secretary of State but was not elected. He went south and was for some time editor of the Memphis Argus, and secretary of the Howard Association. He located in St. Louis where he was managing editor of the St. Louis Daily Times. In 1880, he removed to Washington, D. C., where he was associated with Frank Hatton on the Washington Post as managing editor until he died in 1895. Mr. Sylvester was an able and graceful writer, spending nearly all of his mature life in journalism. His eulogy on Governor Samuel J. Kirkwood was one of the finest productions of the times. He was the originator of the Memorial Bridge project over the Potomac to commemorate the war and link the North with the South.

He died on September 2, 1895. He was buried in Rock Creek Cemetery.
