= Charles H. Ramsey =

American police chief

Chuck Ramsey
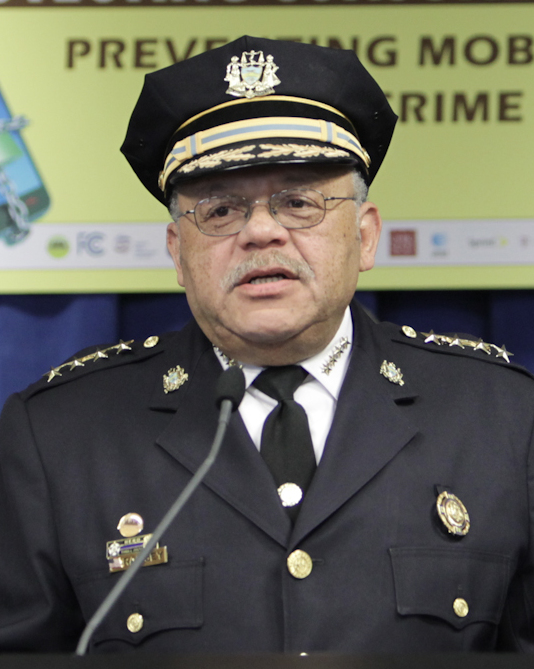
- Born: 1950 (age 75–76); Chicago, Illinois, U.S.
- Education: Lewis University (BS, MS)
- Relatives: Anne Ramsey (Aunt)
- Police career
- Country: United States of America
- Allegiance: City of Philadelphia; District of Columbia; City of Chicago, and Fairfax County Virginia
- Department: Philadelphia Police Department; DC Metropolitan Police Department; Chicago Police Department
- Service years: 1971-1998; 1998-2007; 2008-2016
- Rank: Police Commissioner, Philadelphia Police Department; January 7, 2008 - January 5, 2016 (retirement); Chief of Police, Metropolitan Police Department of the District of Columbia; April 21, 1998 - January 2, 2007; Chicago Police Department; Deputy Superintendent, 1994 - 1998: Deputy Chief, Patrol Division; 1992 - 1994; Commander, Narcotics Division; 1989 - 1992; Captain; 1988 - 1989; Lieutenant; 1984 - 1988; Sergeant; 1977 - 1984; Patrol Officer; 1971 - 1977

Charles H. Ramsey (born 1950) is a former American law enforcement officer who recently served as the Commissioner of the Philadelphia Police Department. Prior to assuming that post in January 2008, he had served as Chief of the Metropolitan Police Department of the District of Columbia (MPD) from 1998 to early 2007. In January 2017, he became a regular CNN contributor.

A native of Chicago, Illinois, he joined the Chicago Police Department as an 18-year-old cadet in 1968. After serving six years as a patrol officer, he was promoted to sergeant in 1977. He was appointed a lieutenant in 1984 and became captain in 1988. He served as Commander of the Narcotics Section from 1989 to 1992 before spending two years as a Deputy Chief of the police force's Patrol Division. In 1994, he was appointed Deputy Superintendent.

In 1998, he became the MPD chief. During his tenure, he was involved in several high-profile cases as chief of police in Washington, D.C., such as the Chandra Levy murder investigation. He has also been in the spotlight since the September 11 attacks focused attention on security issues around Washington, D.C.

Ramsey is a graduate of the FBI National Academy and holds undergraduate and graduate degrees from Lewis University in Romeoville, Illinois.

He has served as an adjunct professor at Lewis University and Northwestern University.

Ramsey is a former member of the National Infrastructure Advisory Council.

== Career as Washington, D.C. police chief ==
Ramsey's eight-year tenure as Chief of Police saw crime rates decline about 40%, the expansion of community policing and traffic safety programs, and improved MPD recruiting and hiring standards, training, equipment, facilities and fleet. He reorganized the department to cut bureaucracy, and created Regional Operations Commands to oversee the quality of D.C. police services. He helped to create a non-emergency 3-1-1 system and made crime information readily available to the public through CrimeReports.com.

He and his department assisted the Department of Homeland Security during the state funerals of Ronald Reagan and Gerald Ford. Chief Ramsey also serves as a regular featured speaker at MPD's DC Police Leadership Academy.

=== Traffic checkpoints ===
Under Ramsey, the D.C, police instituted traffic checkpoints at which information about motorists who were breaking no law at the time was entered into a database. The move was called an "invasion of privacy" by an official of the police union.

=== Pershing Park arrests ===
On September 27, 2002, the MPD made a mass arrest of a large group of demonstrators who had assembled in DC's Pershing Park to protest the World Bank and International Monetary Fund meetings. The police enclosed over 400 people in the park and arrested them without ordering them to disperse or allowing them to leave the park. Many of the arrested were not actually demonstrators, but were journalists, legal observers, and pedestrians.

On January 13, 2006, the District of Columbia Court of Appeals ruled that the arrests violated the Fourth Amendment and that Chief Ramsey could be held personally liable for the violations. On August 2, 2007, City officials in Washington agreed to pay $1 million to more than 120 of the protesters, on top of other settlements by the D.C. government, including one for $640,000. Ramsey was represented by Mark Tuohey who generated at least $1.53 million in fees for his law firm Vinson & Elkins.

According to testimony given by Detective Paul Hustler, Ramsey himself gave the arrest order, although he has repeatedly denied this. Hustler claims he overheard Ramsey say "We're going to lock them up and teach them a lesson."

=== Police car computer usage scandal ===
During Ramsey's tenure, a scandal erupted when it was discovered that computer messaging systems within police cars were being used to transmit anti-gay, racist, and sexist messages. No punishment resulted from the improper use of the systems.

== Retirement from MPD ==
On November 20, 2006, Ramsey announced that he would step down as police chief on January 2, 2007, the inauguration day of Washington, D.C Mayor-Elect Adrian M. Fenty. Fenty selected Cathy Lanier, a 39-year-old commander of the MPD's Homeland Security Division, as his replacement.

Even though Ramsey's official last day was December 28, 2006, he stayed on until January 2, 2007, to deal with security during the state funeral of former president Gerald Ford.

== Philadelphia Police Commissioner ==
On November 15, 2007, Philadelphia Mayor Elect Michael Nutter nominated Ramsey as Police Commissioner. Ramsey came out of retirement to accept the position, and he was sworn in at the beginning of Nutter's term as Mayor on January 7, 2008.

After Ramsey assumed his position, the city's homicide rate dropped 37 percent and violent crime 31 percent. In the city's nine most dangerous districts, which account for 65% of homicides and 75% of shootings, homicides were down by over 40 percent. Ramsey's tactics have included installing a network of surveillance cameras in the city's most dangerous sections, increasing the number of cops on the beat, and moving police patrols out of their squad cars and onto foot patrols or bicycle patrols. In 2014 President Obama selected Ramsey to serve as co-chair of the President's Task Force on 21st Century Policing. Ramsey has also served as President of the Police Executive Research Forum (PERF) and the Major Cities Chiefs Association (MCCA).

On October 14, 2015, Ramsey announced his retirement from the Philadelphia Police Department, effective on January 5, 2016.

Police appointments
Preceded by Sylvester Johnson	Commissioner of the Philadelphia Police Department; 2008–2016	Succeeded by Richard Ross Jr
Preceded by Sonya Proctor; As Interim Police Chief	Chief of the Metropolitan Police Department of the District of Columbia; 1998–2006	Succeeded by Cathy Lanier
