= St. Peter's Church (Washington, D.C.) =

- St. Peter's on Capitol Hill
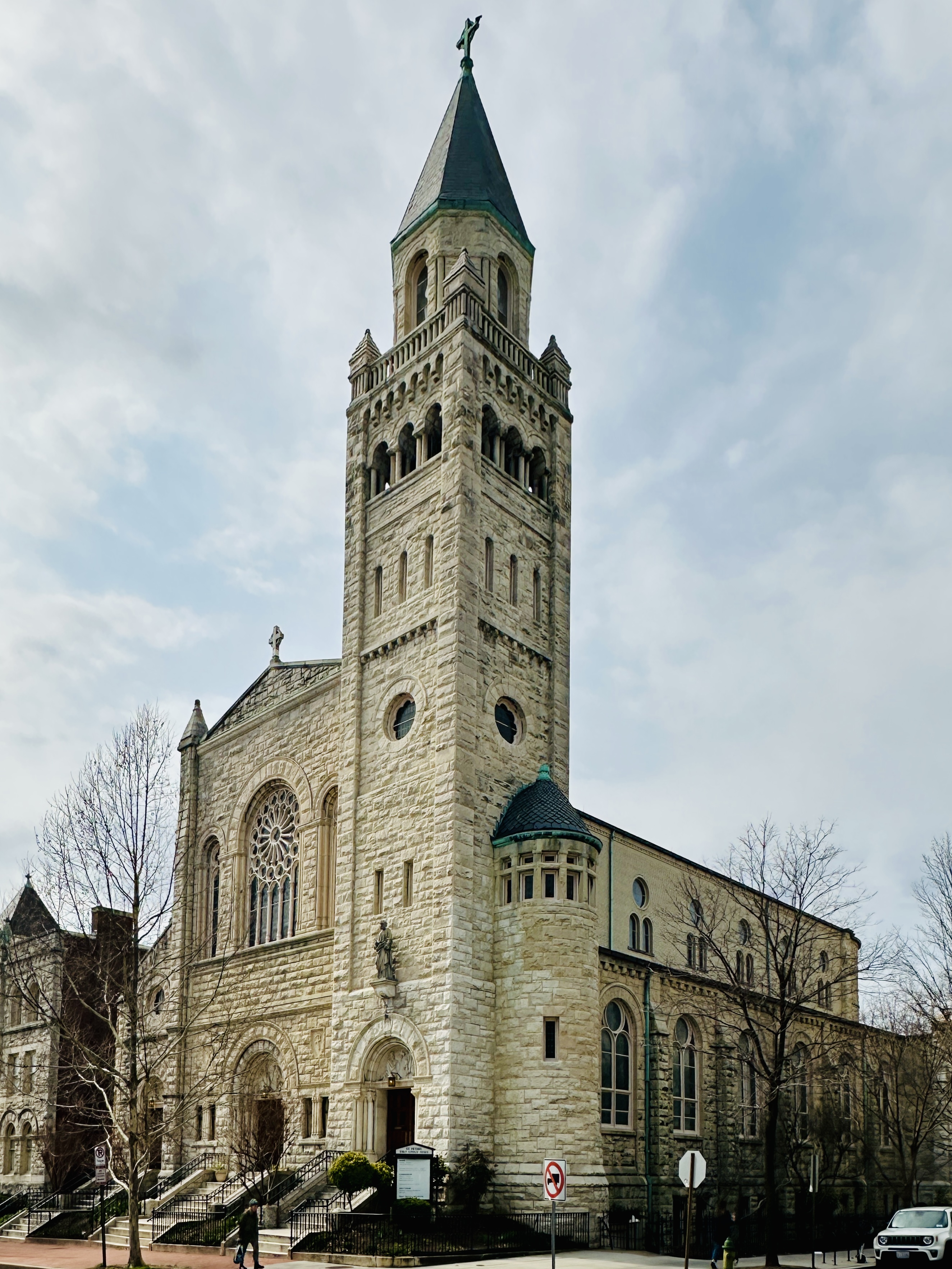
- St. Peter's Church in 2026
- St. Peter's Church
- 38°53′09.1″N 77°00′13.7″W
- Location: 313 2nd Street SE, Washington, D.C.
- Country: United States
- Denomination: Roman Catholic
- Website: saintpetersdc.org

History
- Status: Parish church
- Founded: 1820
- Dedication: Saint Peter
- Dedicated: November 23, 1890

Architecture
- Functional status: Active
- Architectural type: Church
- Years built: 1889

Administration
- Archdiocese: Washington

Clergy
- Pastor: Rev. Daniel B. Carson

St. Peter's Church, also referred to as St. Peter's on Capitol Hill, is a Catholic church on Capitol Hill in Washington, D.C., within the Archdiocese of Washington. Founded in 1820, St. Peter's was the second oldest Catholic parish in the City of Washington (but not the District of Columbia). The church was originally constructed in 1889. However, it was destroyed by a fire in 1940 and rebuilt. Its motto is, "To be a tangible manifestation of Christ in the community."

The church's proximity to the United States Capitol Building attracts many members of Congress and congressional staffers, and its location on the House side of the Capitol has made it commonly known as the House church, while its counterpart on the Senate side, St. Joseph's, is known as the Senate church.

== History ==
=== Original church building ===
St. Peter's Church was founded in 1821 to serve a growing Catholic population in Washington. As it grew, the first Catholic church in the city, St. Patrick's Church, became increasingly distant from many parishioners, especially for those east of the Anacostia River. As a result, plans for the construction of a second Catholic church in the City of Washington date to as early as 1801, when John Carroll, Bishop of Baltimore, requested President Thomas Jefferson's permission to construct a church on South Capitol Street between N and O Streets. The territory of the parish, which was intended to primarily serve residents of the Navy Yard, Washington Arsenal, and Capitol Hill, originally comprised the area between Tiber Creek and the Navy Yard, and the Washington City Canal and the eastern border of the District of Columbia.

In May 1820, a committee of nine influential Catholics, including William Leigh Brent, William Matthews, James Hoban, and Daniel Carroll as chairman, was convened to raise funds for the construction of a church. In order to facilitate contributions, Archbishop Ambrose Maréchal appointed a pastor for the church and canonically established the parish in 1820. On September 3, 1821, James F. M. Lucas was made pastor of St. Peter's. Daniel Carroll donated three lots of land on Capitol Hill, which were complemented by an additional three, on which the original church building was built in 1821. Matthews was particularly consumed with combatting the lay trusteesism that caused tension between Lucas and the wealthy parishioners. Eventually, once the debt on the church was paid off, its deed was conveyed to the archbishop, laying to rest the trustee issue. In 1829, Lucas resigned as pastor to join the Jesuits at Georgetown College.

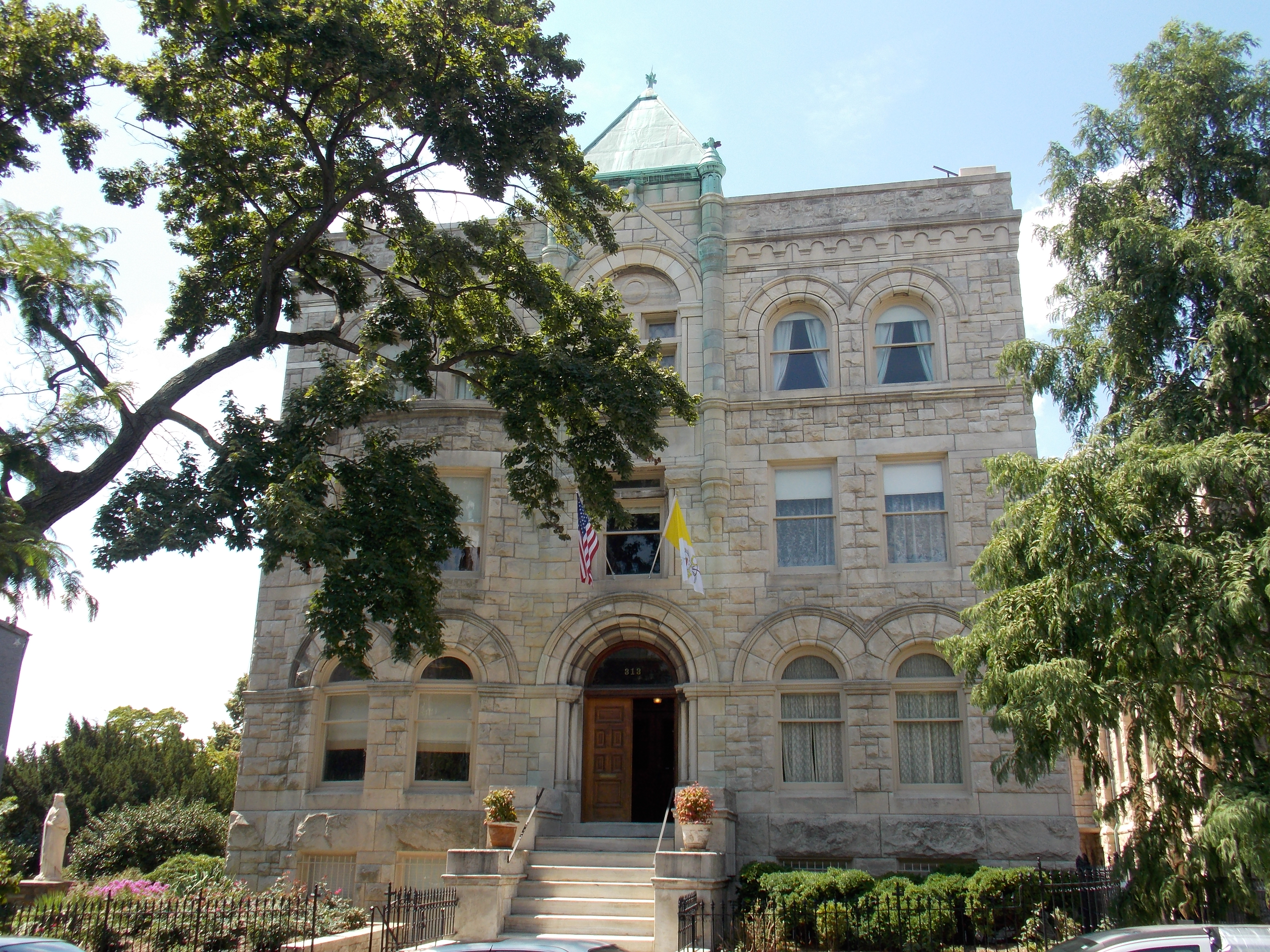
The current rectory was built in 1901.

The first church building was plain and made of brick, with a pebbledash façade and shingle roof. From its beginnings, both white and black Catholics worshipped in the same church, albeit with black parishioners sitting in the upper gallery. Before Lucas left, he began to raise funds to build a rectory. Prior to its construction, Lucas resided in the homes of parishioners.

In 1829, Matthew Deagle, previously an assistant curate to Lucas, became the second pastor of the church. His term did not last long, however, as he died in 1831. Deagle was succeeded by James Hoerner, under whom the first parish house was purchased in 1832. Hoerner was followed as pastor by Peter Schieiber, Peter Velmans, and Van Horsign. During Horsign's pastorates of 1834 to 1849, a new sacristy and schoolroom were built. Horsign was succeeded in 1851 by Edward A. Knight, who converted to Catholicism, and had previously been a member of the Sulpicians and the president of St. Mary's College in Baltimore. With his own funds, Knight expanded the church by adding confessionals, a choir gallery, and a belfry.

The subsequent pastor was Francis Boyle, under whose leadership the church's first parochial school opened. The school was built on land donated by a parishioner, Thomas Bayne. The students were taught by two Sisters of the Holy Cross starting in 1868. In 1885, the church hosted the consecration of Bishop Jeremiah O’Sullivan.

=== New church building ===
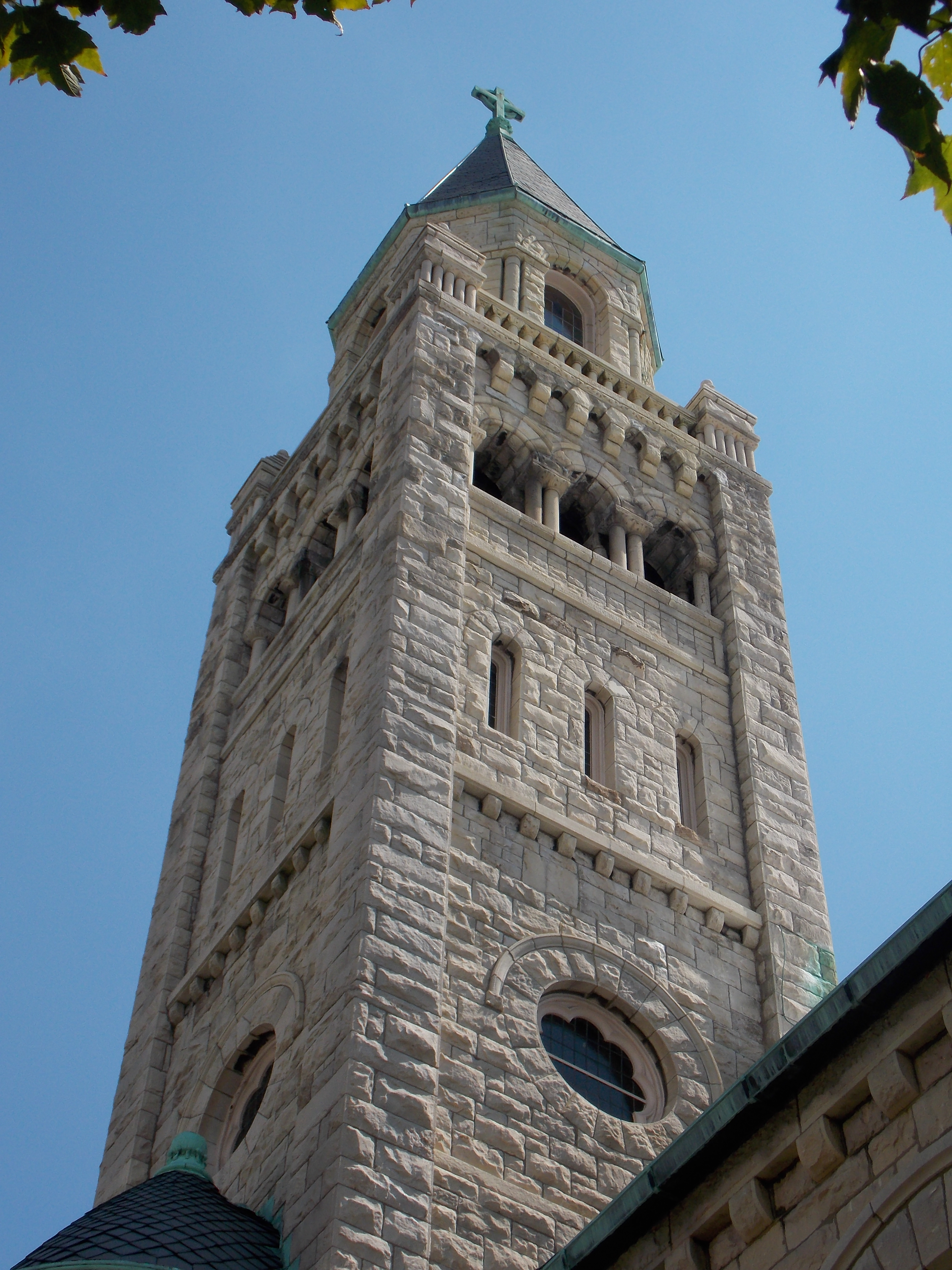
Belfry of St. Peter's, rebuilt in 1941.

During the next pastorate of Monsignor James O'Brien, who began in 1888, the demolition of the church began in 1889. The foundation of the building was dedicated by Cardinal James Gibbons on November 23, 1890. Within the year, the building was sufficiently complete to allow Mass to be said in the church on Christmas day. By the end of 1889, the building made of granite and marble quarried in Maryland was complete, with its spire rising to 140 feet and the nave seating 950 people. It was outfitted with French glass windows. In 1901, the rectory was rebuilt under O'Brien to provide for more comfortable living conditions. O'Brien retired in December 1922 and was succeeded by Eugene J. Connelly as pastor in 1922, previously the chancellor to the archbishop. A new school was built in 1923 and again in the 1930s due to overcrowding.

On the morning of March 17, 1940, the church building was destroyed by a five-alarm fire, which was caused by a spark from a blowtorch being used to remove paint from the windows of the clerestory. Assistant priests Charles W. Nelson and Frances E. Sullivan rushed to remove the Eucharistic vessels from the building. Following the fire, the nearby Foundry United Methodist Church took up a collection of its parishioners to assist St. Peter's. Likewise, the Lutheran Church of the Reformation and St. Mark's Episcopal Church offered to allow the priests of St. Peter's to celebrate Mass there, though these offers were not taken up.

The church began to be rebuilt in June 1940, opening on April 13, 1941, Easter Sunday. Archbishop Michael Curley presided over the opening.

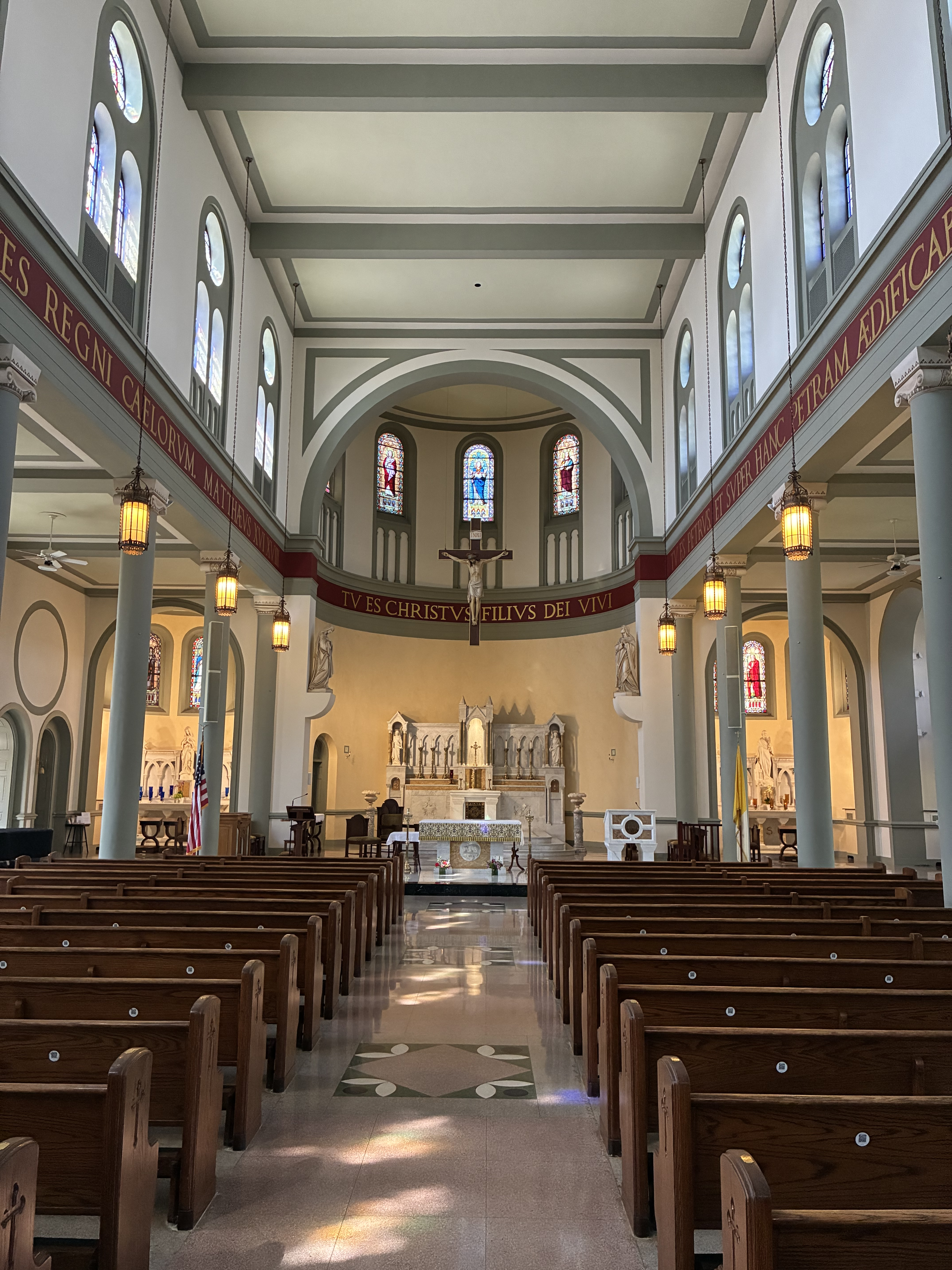
View toward the chancel

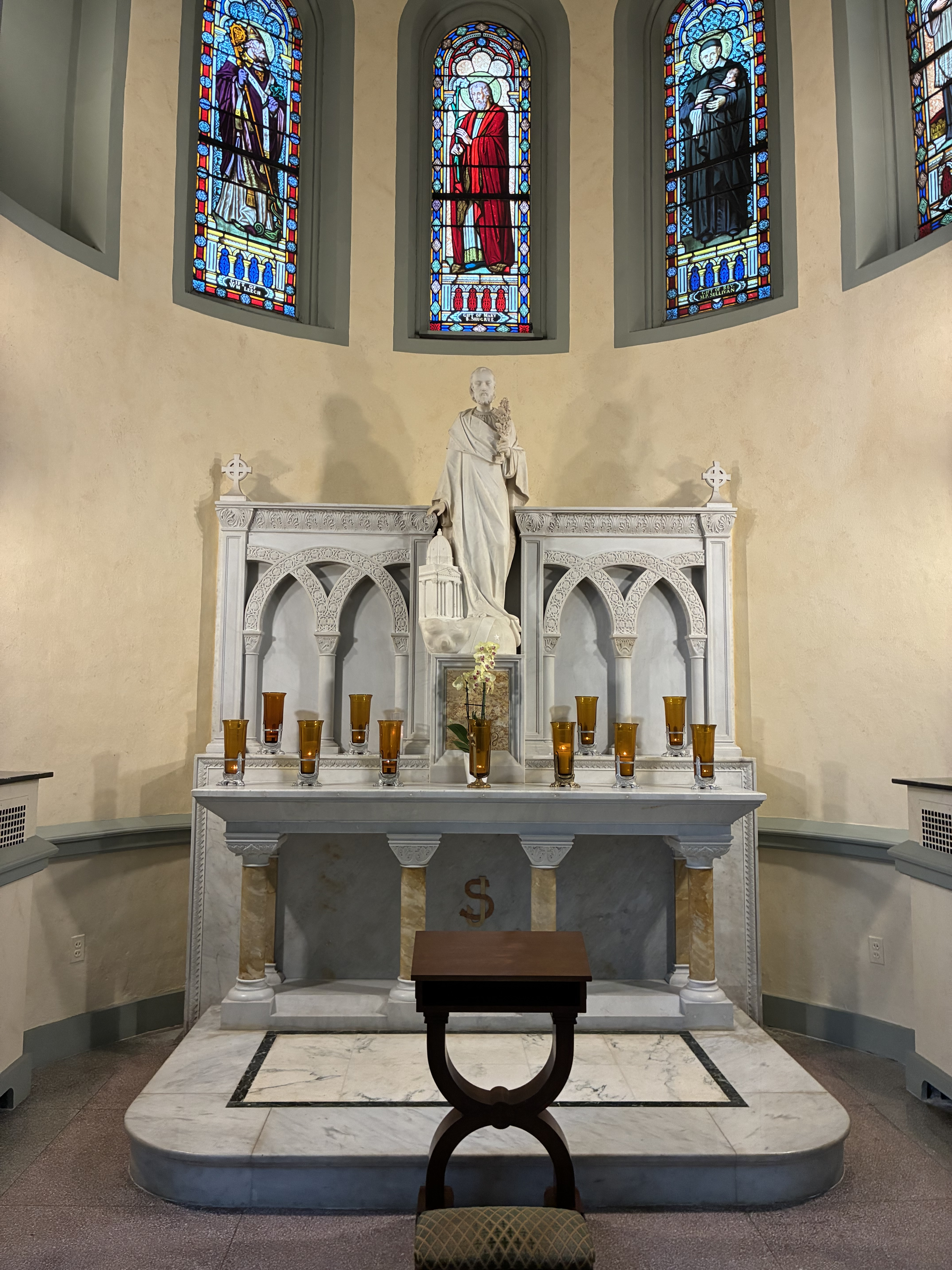
Altar in the northern nave with a statue of St Peter

== Parish life ==
As of 2025, there were 3020 registered parishioners (including children). For the fiscal year that ended 30 June 2025, a total income of about 1.3 million USD was recorded. The endowment report for the same period lists assets with a value of about 3.7 million USD.

The State of the Parish Report for 2025 lists 59 baptisms, 65 first communions, 38 confirmations, 14 adults welcomed through the Order of Christian Initiation of Adults, 25 couples prepared for marriage and 10 funerals.

== Music ==
The music program is currently led by Kevin O‘Brien. The Choir provides music for the Sunday 9 a.m. mass, the Folk Group provides music for the Sunday 11:00 a.m. mass.

=== Organs ===
After the fire that devastated the church in 1940, a pipe organ was installed. It was assembled from used parts and did not benefit from the coherent tonal and mechanical design that a new instrument could bring.

In 2001, the earthquake that hit Washington caused a large portion of the plaster wall to come loose and crash into the organ, infiltrating the winding system, which would cause the instrument to rot from the inside out. After considering many different options, it was decided that starting with a new organ was the best solution. In early 2019, the Noack organbuilding firm from Georgetown (Massachusetts) built a three-manual instrument on the Western gallery as their Opus 162.

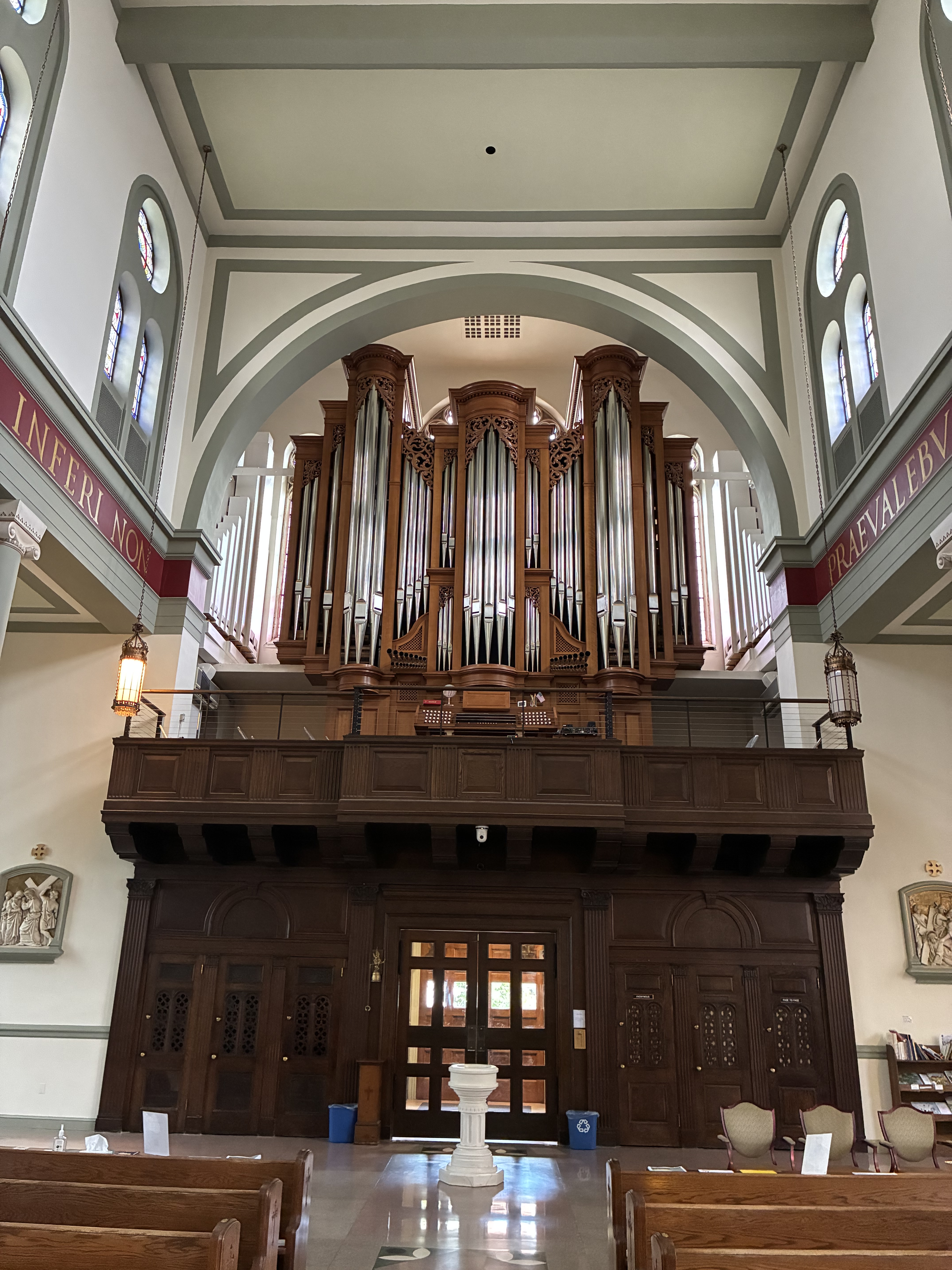
Western gallery with organ case

In 2024, Peter Meier Orgelbau from Rheinfelden (Switzerland) built a four-stop chest organ that can be used as a continuo instrument, but it can also be played from the gallery organ‘s console via electric transmission.

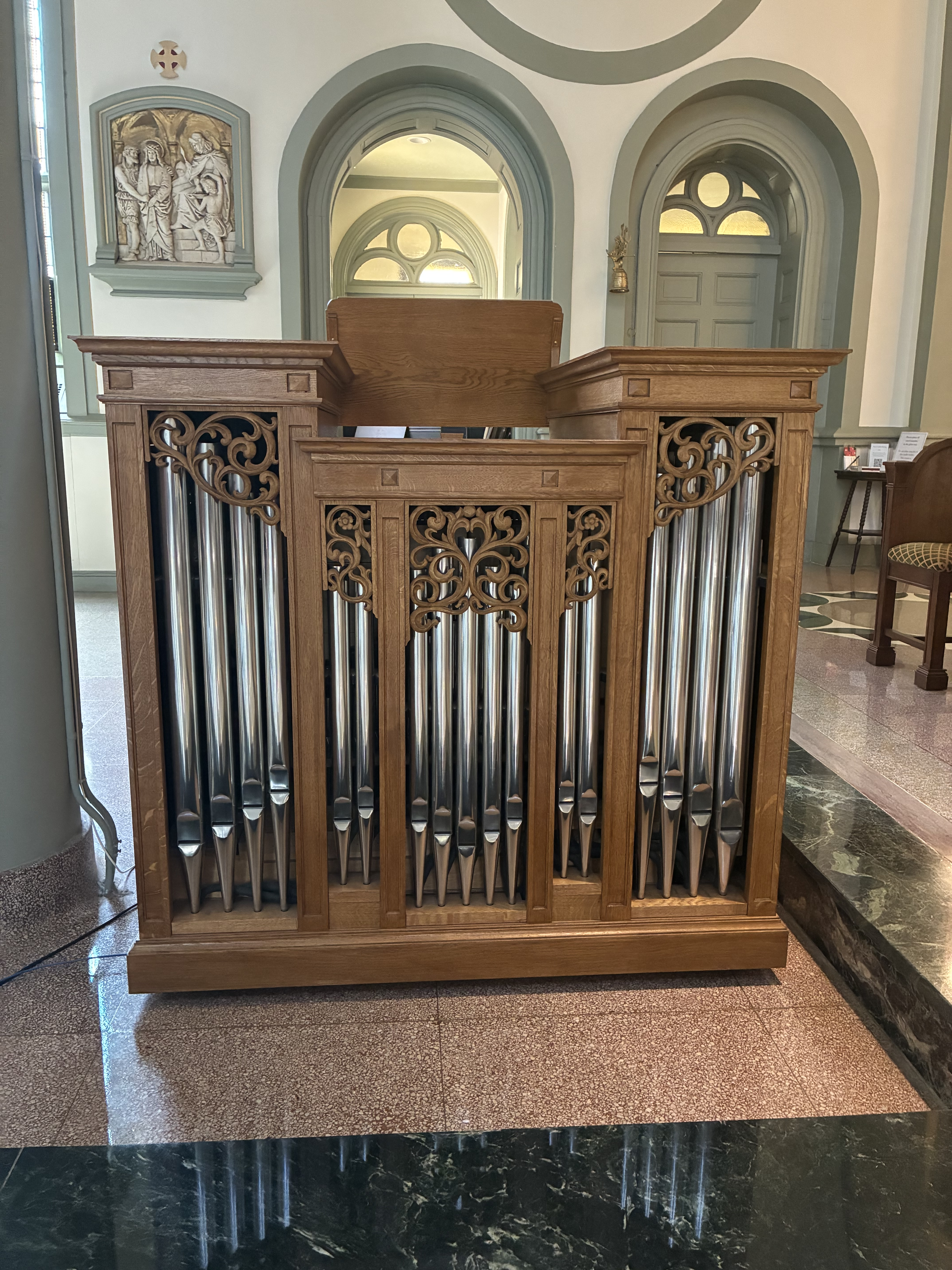
Chest organ in the chancel

== Pastors ==
The pastors of St. Peter's Church in chronological order have been:

- Rev. James F.M. Lucas (September 1821 – July 1829)
- Rev. Matthew P. Deagle (August 1829 – October 1831)
- Rev. James Hoerner (October 1831 – December 1832)
- Rev. Peter Stanislaus Schreiber (December 1832 – December 1833)
- Rev. Peter Velmans (December 1833 – July 1834)
- Rev. Joseph Van Horsigh (July 1834 – November 1849)
- Rev. Peter B. Lenaghan (November 1849 – December 1851)
- Rev. Edward A. Knight (December 1851 – September 1862)
- Rev. Francis E. Boyle (September 1862 – April 1878)
- Rev. Desiderius DeWulf (April 1878 – November 1878)
- Rev. Jeremiah O'Sullivan (November 1878 – September 1885)
- Rev. George W. Devine (February 1886 – March 1888)
- Rt. Rev. James O'Brien (April 1888 – December 1922)
- Rt. Rev. Eugene J. Connelly (December 1922 – May 1942)
- Rt. Rev. Walter J. Hayes (June 1942 – March 1954)
- Rt. Rev. Maurice King (June 1954 – June 1966)
- Very Rev. William J. Awalt (June 1966 – June 1968)
- Rev. Leonard F. Hurley (September 1968 – November 1970)
- Rev. Michael J. O'Sullivan (November 1970 – July 2005)
- Rev. Charles McCann (July 2005 - June 2007)
- Rev. William Byrne (August 2007– June 2015)
- Rev. Kevin Hart (July 2015 – January 2017)
- Rev. Gary Studniewski (January 2017 – June 2022)
- Rev. Daniel B. Carson (July 2022 – present)

== St. Peter's School ==
St Peter's also maintains a parochial school. St. Peter's School is the oldest parochial elementary school in Washington D.C. The effort to build the school can be traced back to 1826. In July, 1826, Daniel Carroll, a prominent Washington landowner, imparted to Archbishop Ambrose Maréchal of Baltimore about his hope for a school on Capitol Hill. The archbishop rejected the initial proposal.

However, despite the rejection, St. Peter's School was built in 1868 when land was donated by a convert to Catholicism named Thomas Bayne. The school was run by Reverend Francis Boyle and two lay teachers, who may have been ladies of the parish, as faculty.

St. Peter School currently offers a pre-kindergarten through eighth grade program.

== See also ==
- St. Aloysius Church (Washington, D.C.)
- Holy Trinity Catholic Church (Washington, D.C.)
