= St. Joseph's Catholic Church (Washington, D.C.) =

- St. Joseph's on Capitol Hill
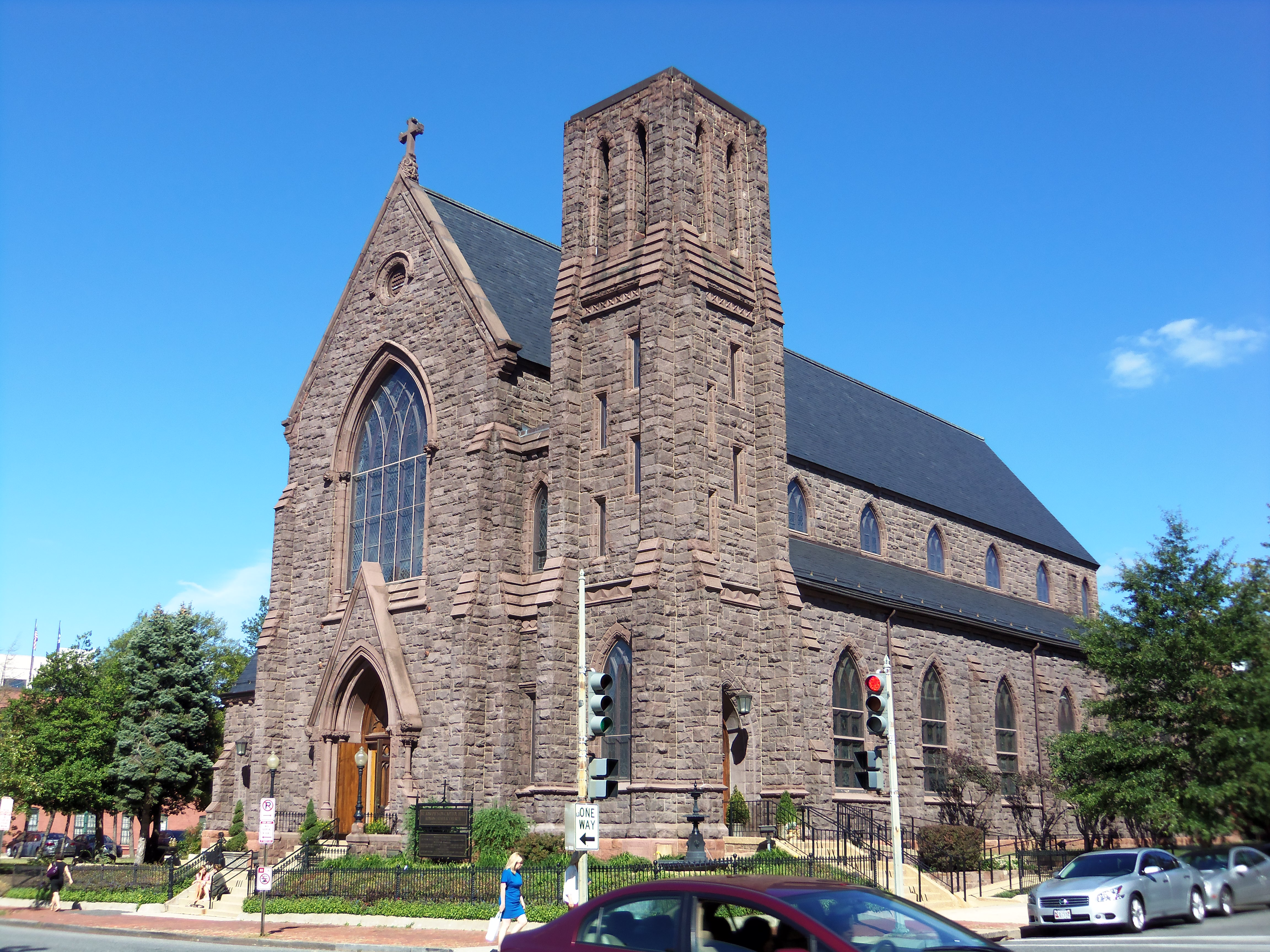

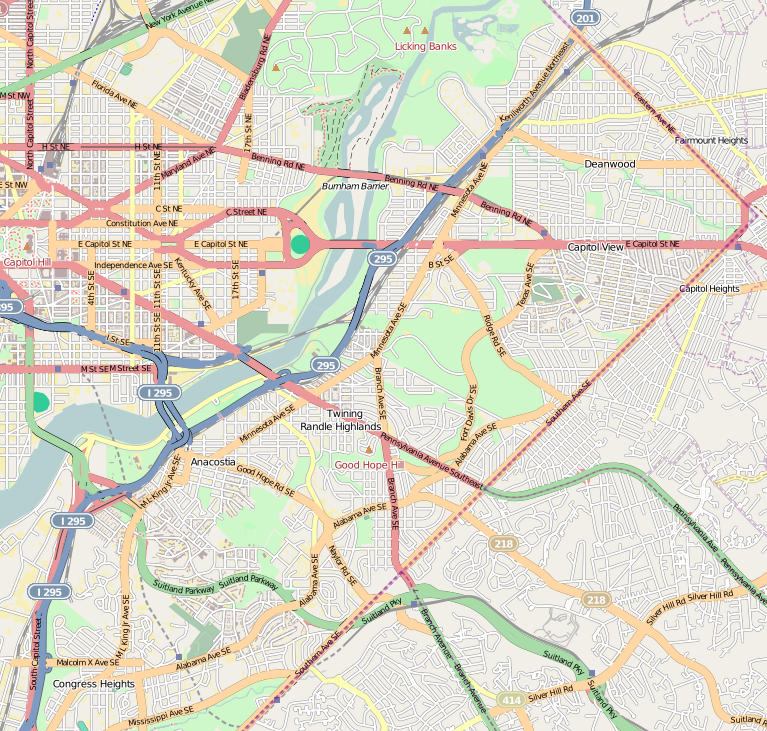
- Location within Washington, D.C.
- 38.8937°N 77.0052°W
- Location: 313 2nd Street NE, Washington, D.C.
- Country: United States
- Denomination: Roman Catholic
- Website: stjosephsdc.org

History
- Status: Parish church
- Founded: October 25, 1868
- Dedication: Saint Joseph
- Dedicated: January 18, 1891

Architecture
- Functional status: Active
- Architectural type: Church

Administration
- Archdiocese: Washington

Clergy
- Pastor: Rev. William H. Gurnee III

St. Joseph's Catholic Church, also commonly known as St. Joseph's on Capitol Hill, is a parish of the Roman Catholic Church in the Capitol Hill neighborhood of Washington, D.C., in the Archdiocese of Washington. The church is located less than half a mile from the United States Capitol Building and United States Supreme Court Building.

The church's proximity to the Supreme Court, Capitol, and congressional office buildings have attracted many members of Congress, congressional staffers, and Supreme Court justices to daily Mass. St. Joseph is located on the Senate side of the Capitol, and is commonly known as the Senate church, while its counterpart on the House side of the Capitol, St. Peter's, is commonly known as the House church. Those known to attend daily Mass at St. Joseph's include Senator John E. Kenna, Senator Robert F. Kennedy, Senator Ted Kennedy, and Antonin Scalia. In 2017, the church began holding an annual "Gold Mass" for congressional staffers.

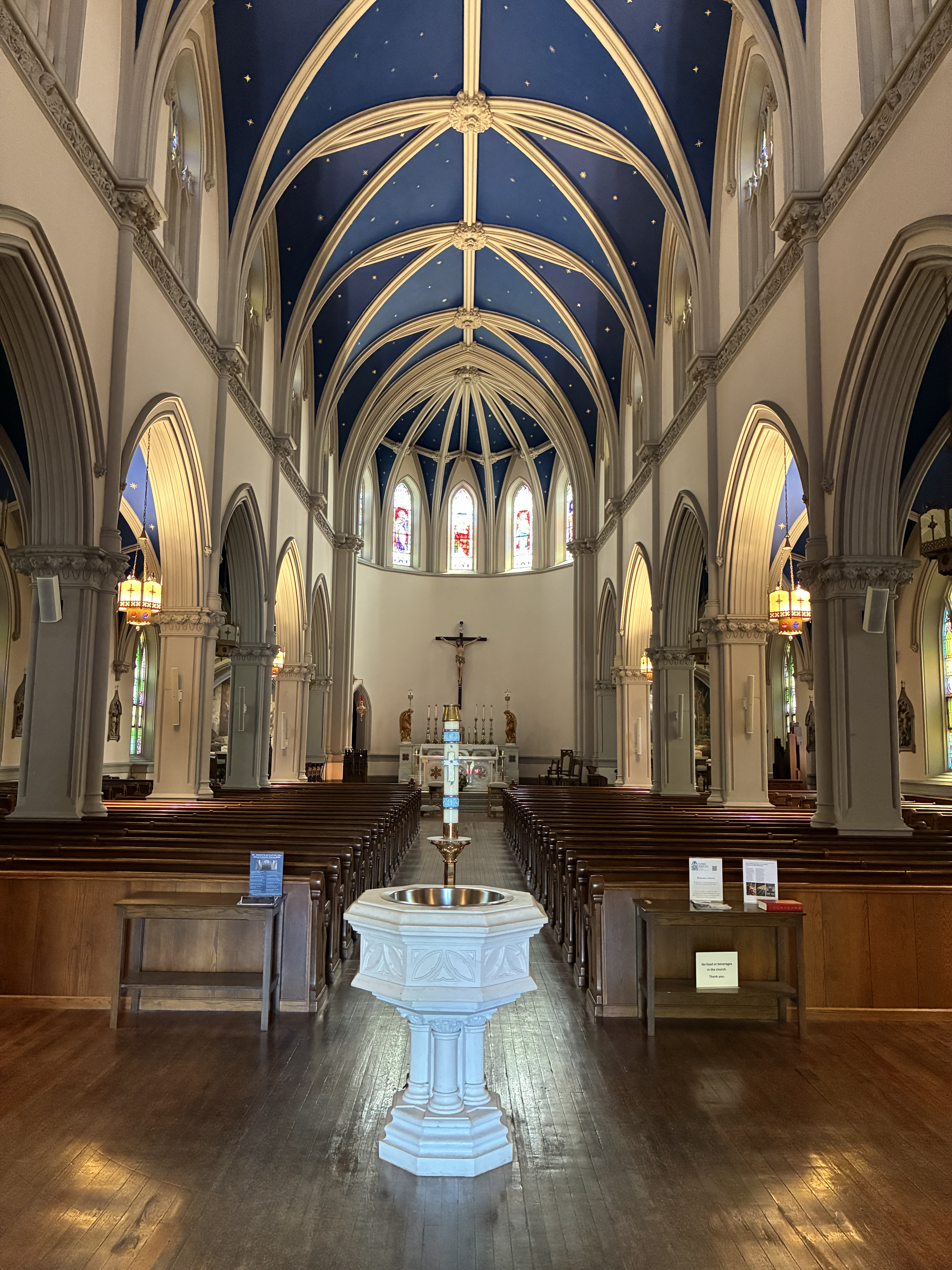
Interior view

== History ==
The church was founded by German immigrants on October 25, 1868, when a reported crowd of 20,000 people, including President Andrew Johnson, came to lay the cornerstone. The architect was Philip N. Dwyer (1859-1897), who also built St. Paul‘s Church on 15th and V St NW (today St. Augustine Catholic Church (Washington, D.C.)).

The church was constructed of brown stone from Hershey, Pennsylvania and cost $75,000 to build. It was dedicated on January 18, 1891. Masses were originally celebrated in Latin (as was the case everywhere before 1964) with homilies in German until Italian immigrant stonemasons working on expansion of the Capitol began joining the congregation. The church underwent an extensive renovation and restoration beginning in 2002.

== Pipe Organs ==
The historic Hook & Hastings Op. 1487, 1891 pipe organ has been fully restored by the David E. Wallace & Co. LLC Pipe Organ Builders. The organ was dissembled in June 2024, and spent sixteen months in Maine before returning to St. Joseph’s in the fall of 2025. In addition to a full restoration, the hand-pumping mechanism has been restored/recreated and a new 16’ Trombone in the style of Hook & Hastings has been added to the Pedal division.

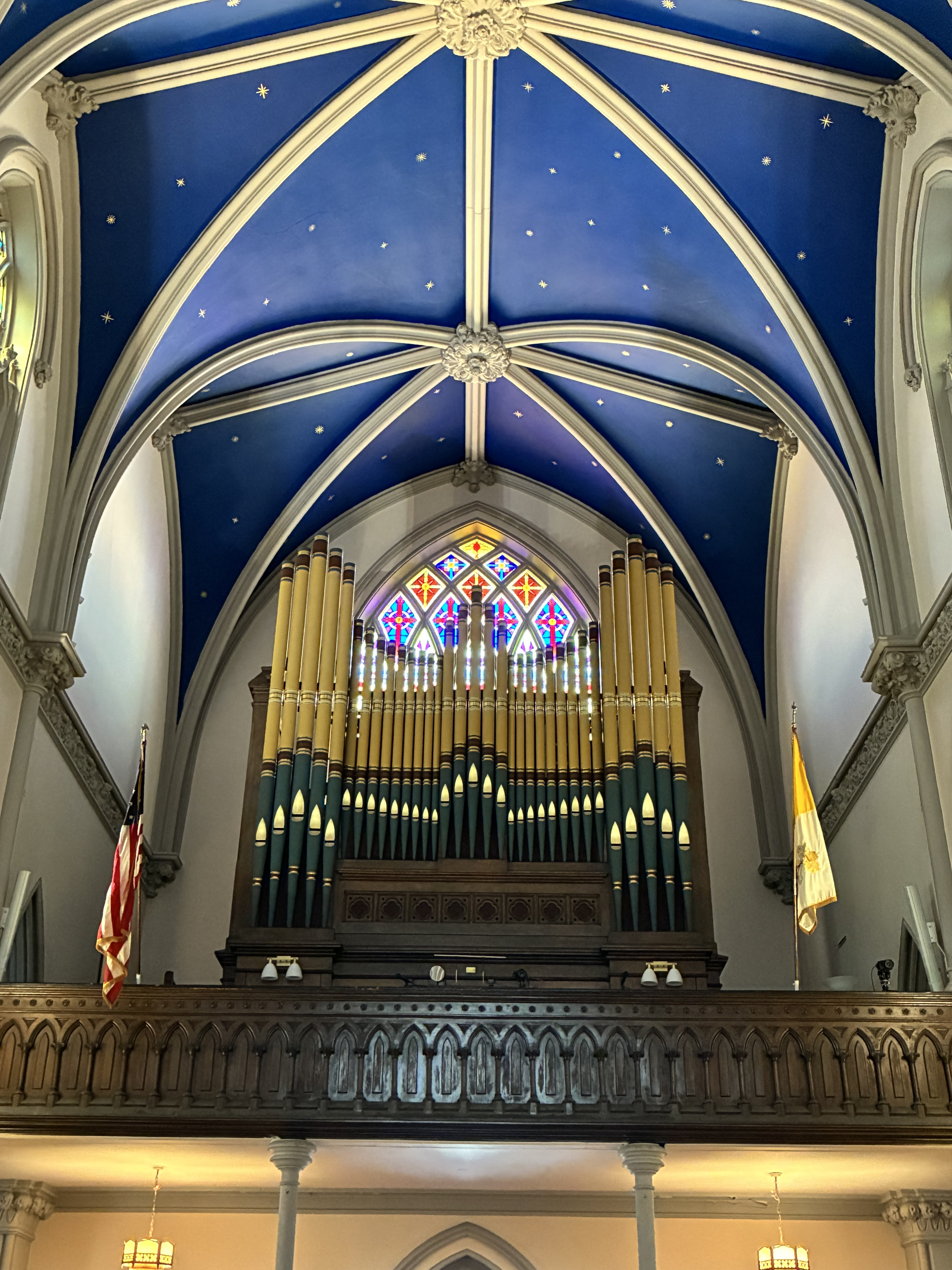
Gallery organ

A smaller Hook & Hastings organ, dating from 1870 and restored by Meloni & Farrier, has been set up in the chancel.

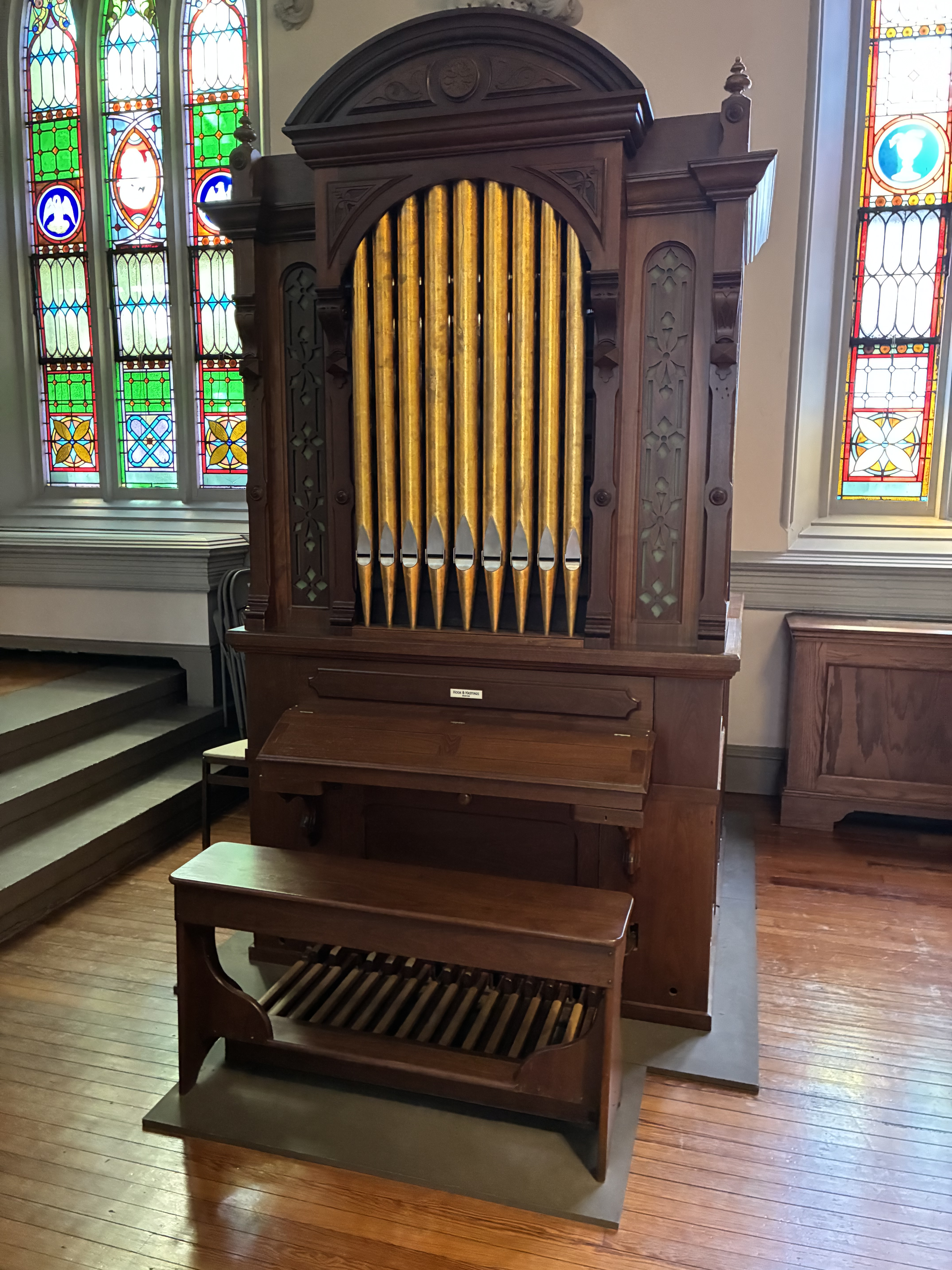
Chancel organ

== See also ==
- St. Peter's Church (Washington, D.C.)
