= Capitol Hill =

United States historic place and neighborhood of Washington, D.C.

- Neighborhood of Washington, D.C.
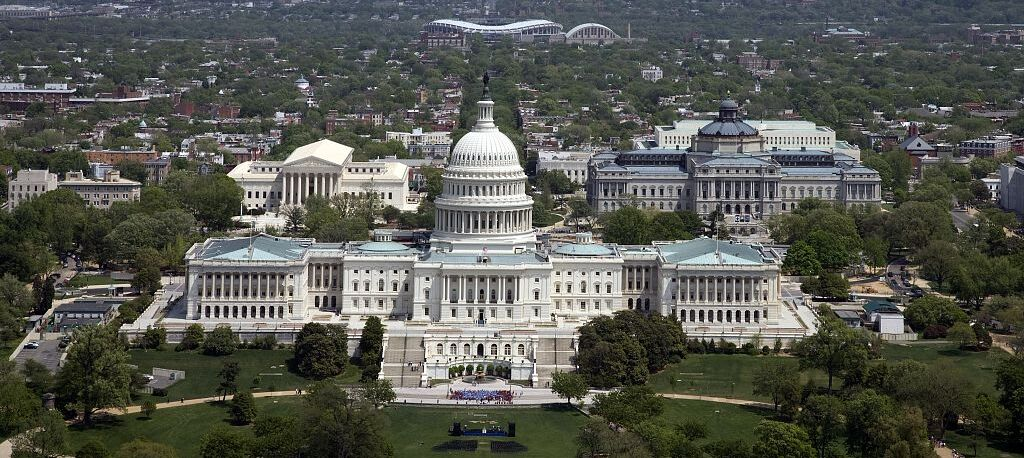
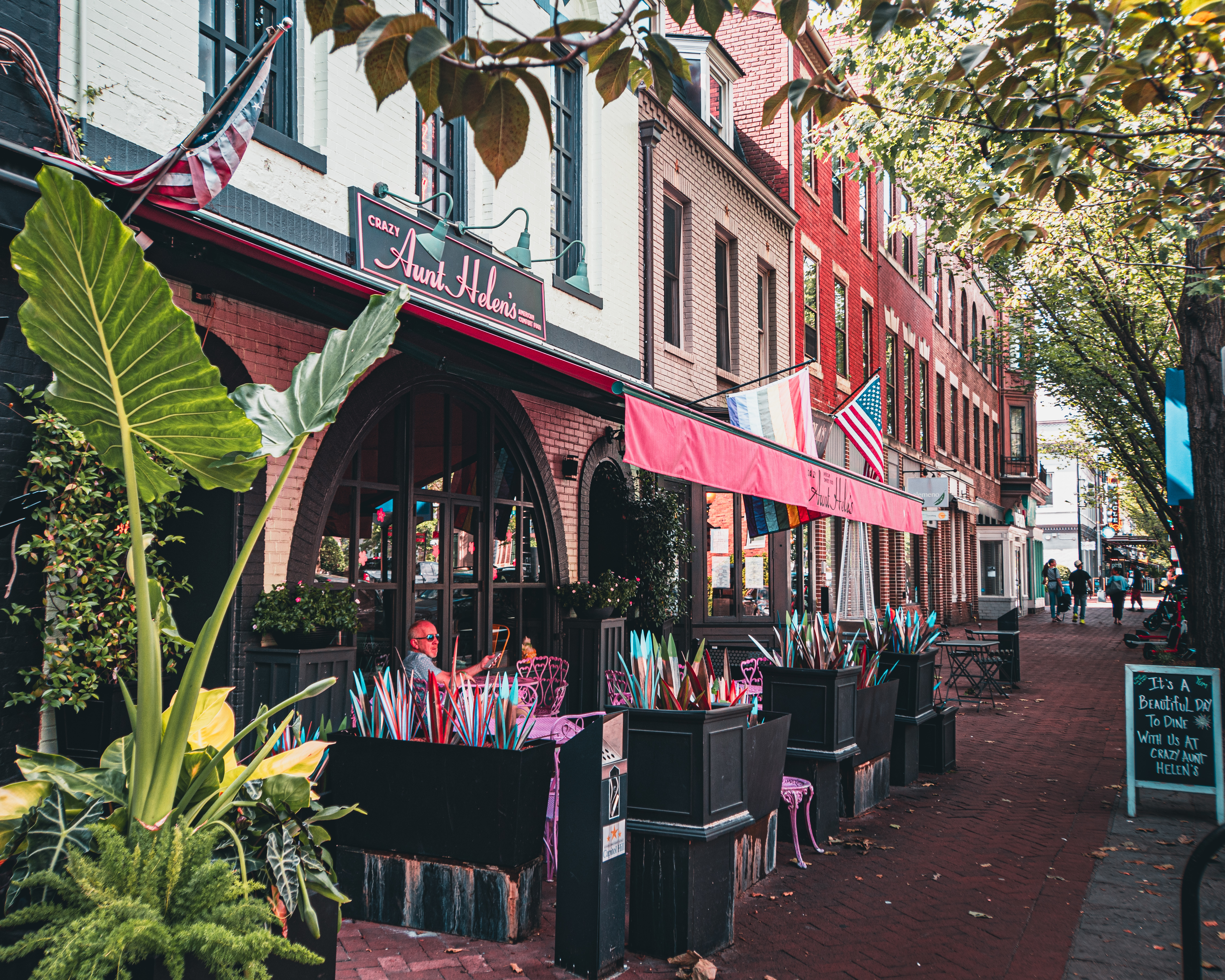
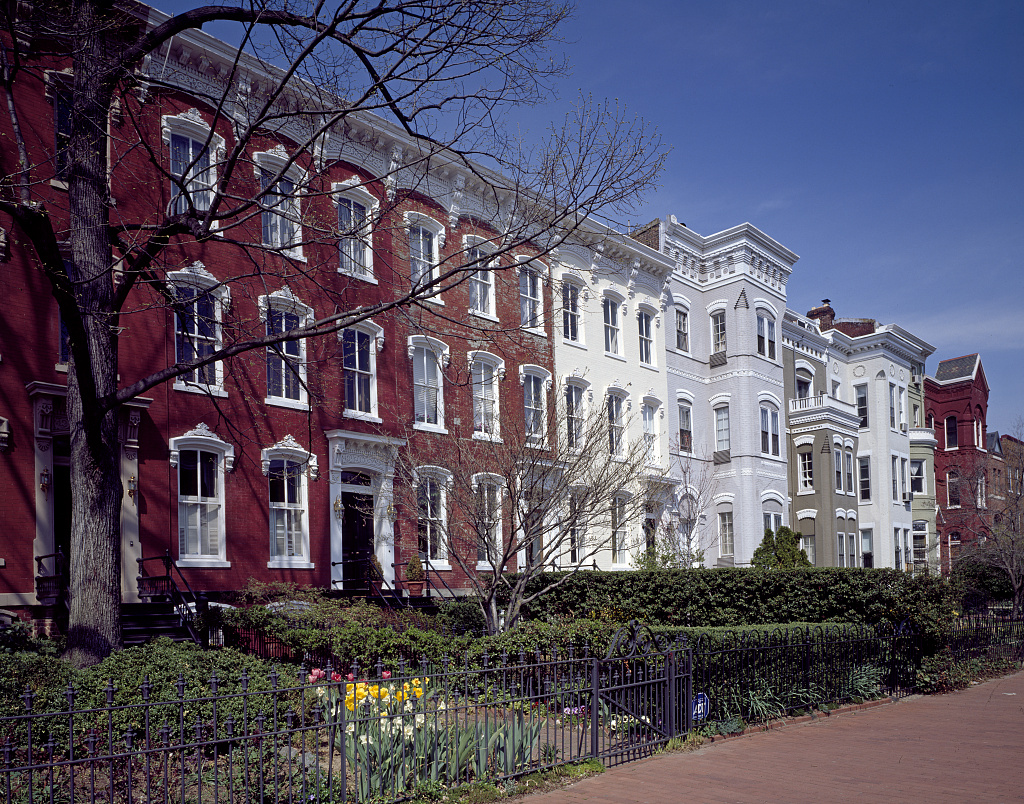
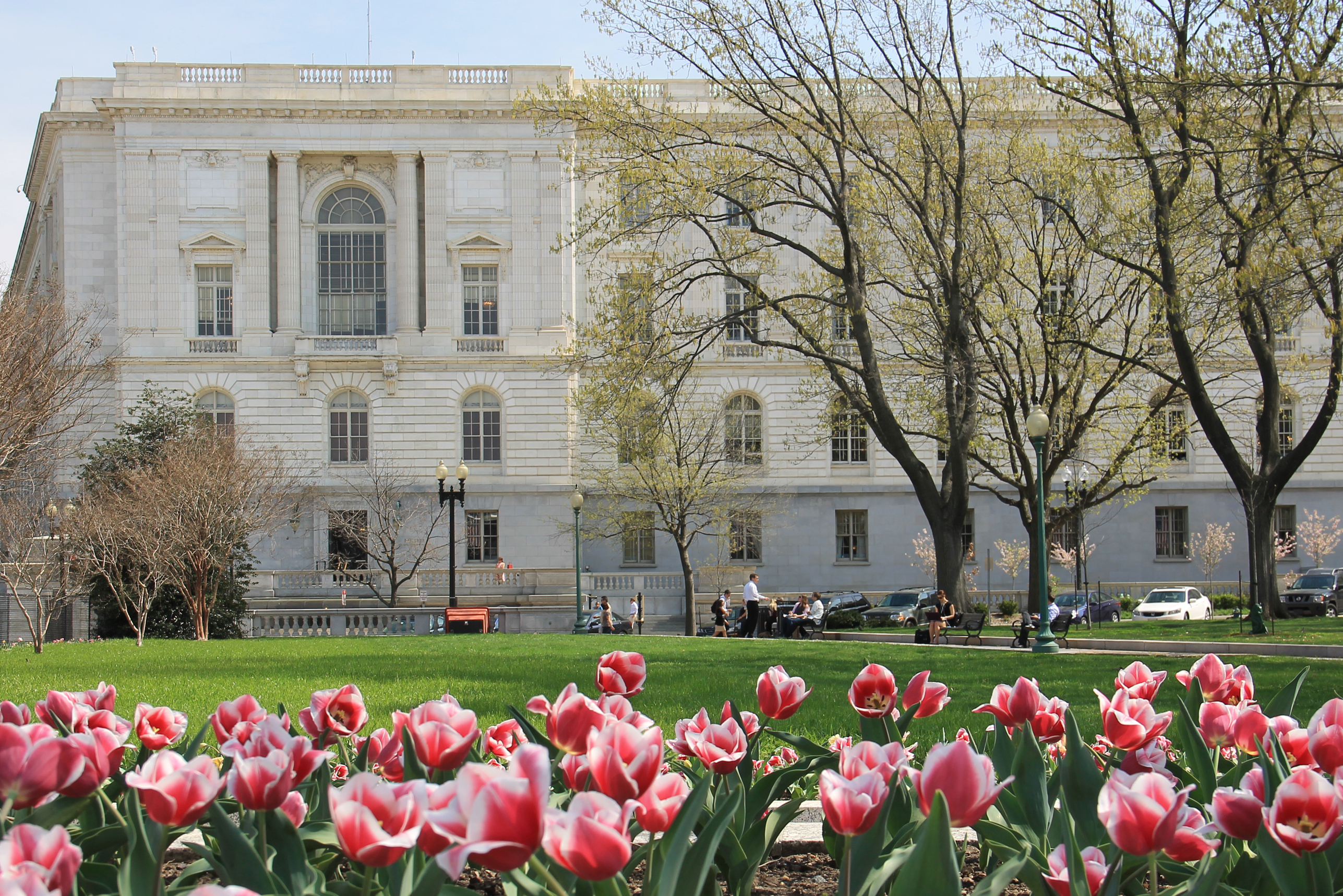
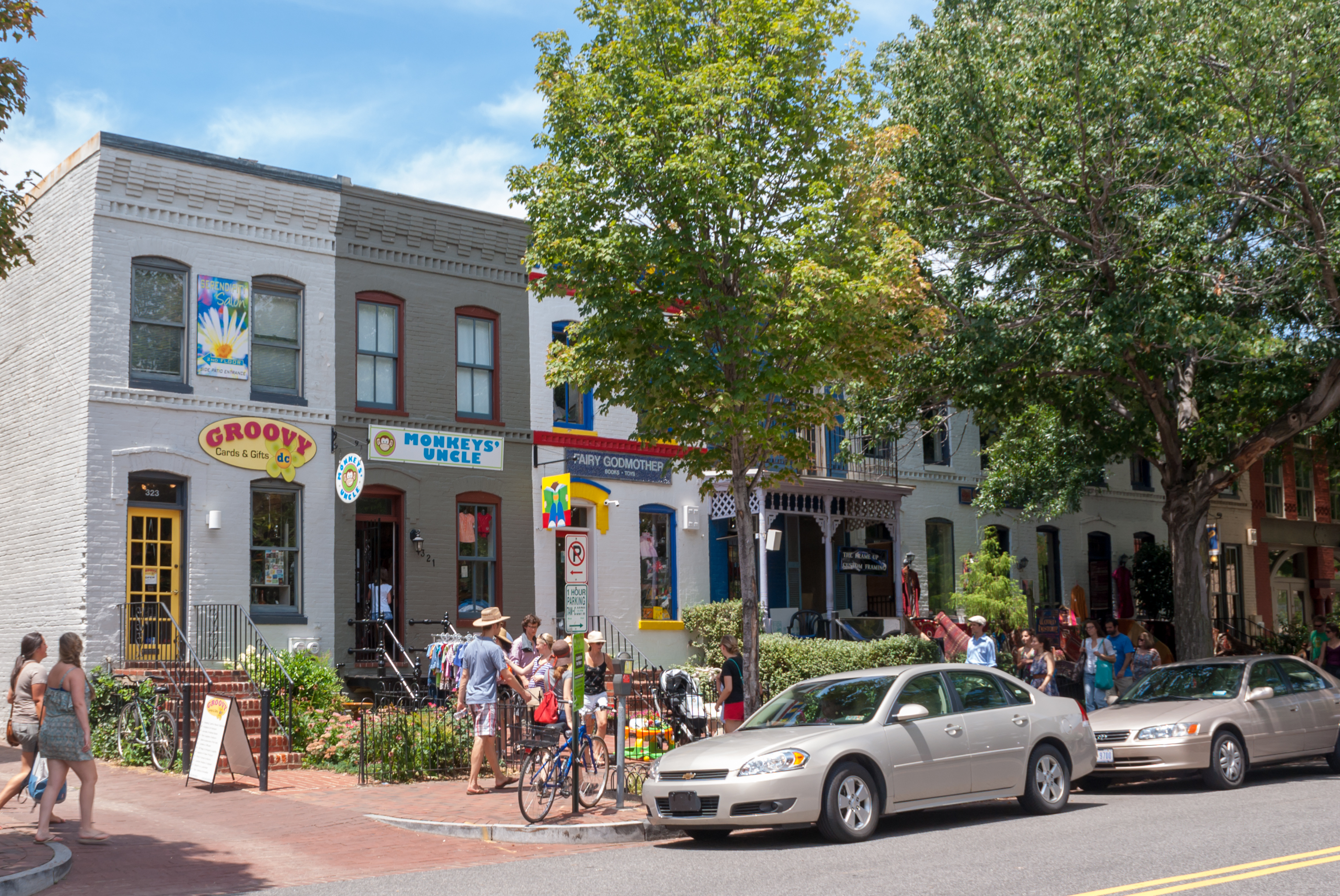
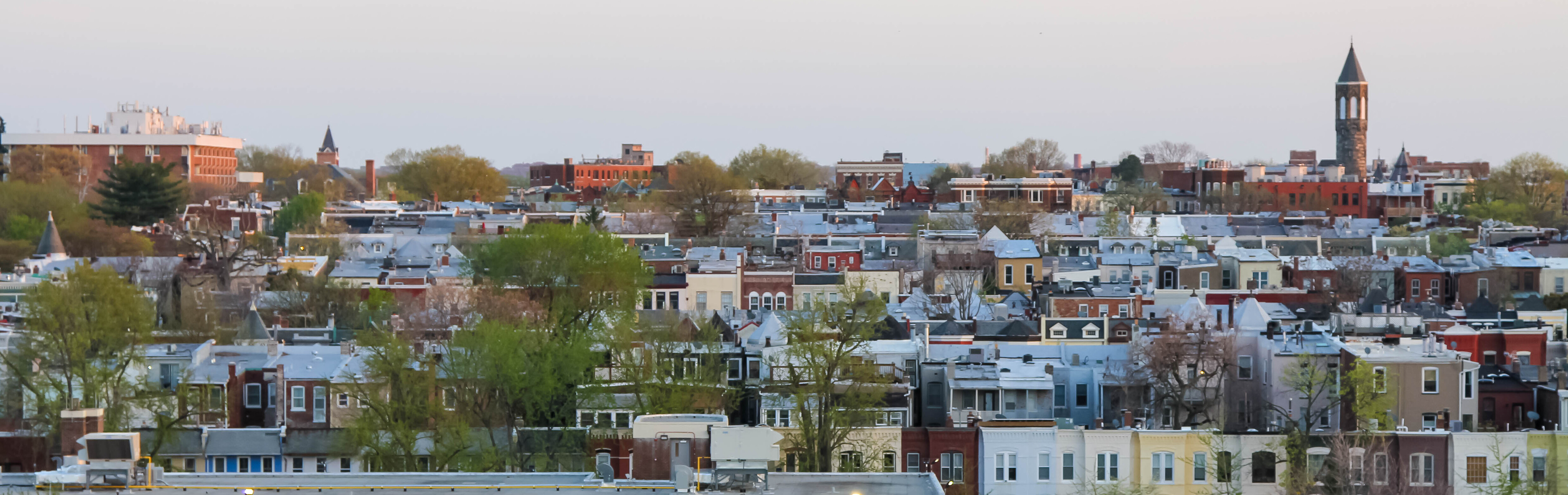
- Top: U.S. Capitol Complex; middle top: Barracks Row (left) and historic rowhomes (right); middle bottom: Russell Senate Building (left) and Eastern Market (right) bottom: view over Capitol Hill.

- Country: United States
- District: Washington, D.C.
- Quadrants: Northeast, Southeast
- Ward: 6
- ZIP code: 20002; 20003
- Area code: 202

Capitol Hill is a neighborhood in Washington, D.C., located in both the Northeast and Southeast quadrants. It is bounded by 15th Street SE & NE, F Street NE, Southeast Boulevard SE, and South Capitol Street SE. Dominated by the United States Capitol, which sits on the highest point of Capitol Hill, it is one of the oldest historic districts in Washington. The neighborhood has a high concentration of rowhouses, largely dating from the 19th century. Home to around 35,000 people in just under 2 square miles (5 km^{2}), Capitol Hill is also one of the most densely populated neighborhoods in Washington. The name Capitol Hill is frequently used as a metonym for the U.S. Congress.

Capitol Hill is famed as a center of the United States government, home to numerous important institutions including, the U.S. Congress, the Supreme Court, and the Library of Congress. Apart from government, the neighborhood is largely residential, but maintains notable commercial hubs along Pennsylvania Avenue, such as Eastern Market and Barracks Row.

== History ==
=== 18th century ===
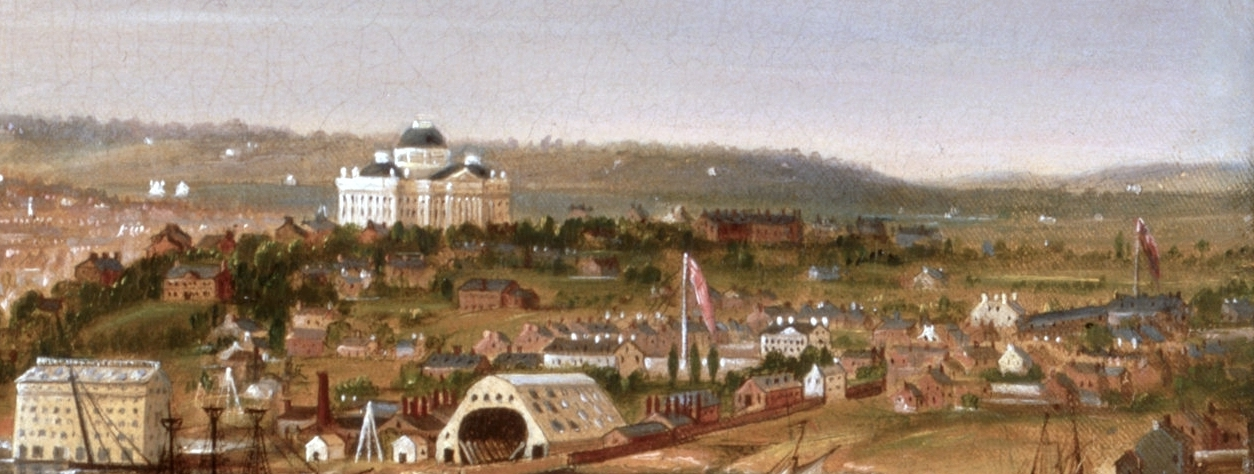
A view of Capitol Hill and Navy Yard below, in 1833

Pierre Charles L'Enfant selected the location of the United States Capitol (the "Congress House") in his 1791 design for the federal capital city (see: L'Enfant Plan). The building would be the symbolic center of his plan. He referred to the hill chosen as the site of the future Congress House as "Jenkins Hill" or "Jenkins Heights".

However, the tract of land had for many years belonged to the Carroll family and was noted in their records of ownership as "Rome". While a man named Thomas Jenkins had once pastured some livestock at the site of the Capitol (and thus his name was associated with the site), artist John Trumbull, who would paint several murals inside the Capitol's rotunda, reported in 1791 that the site was covered with a thick wood, making it an unlikely place for livestock to graze. Research published in 2004 by the Capitol Hill Historical Society showed that Jenkins' land was seven blocks east of the site of the Capitol and that L'Enfant was likely to have given Jenkins' name to the general location.

While serving in 1793 as President George Washington's secretary of state, Thomas Jefferson named Capitol Hill, invoking the famous Temple of Jupiter Optimus Maximus on the Capitoline Hill, one of the seven hills of Rome. However, the connection between the two is not completely clear.

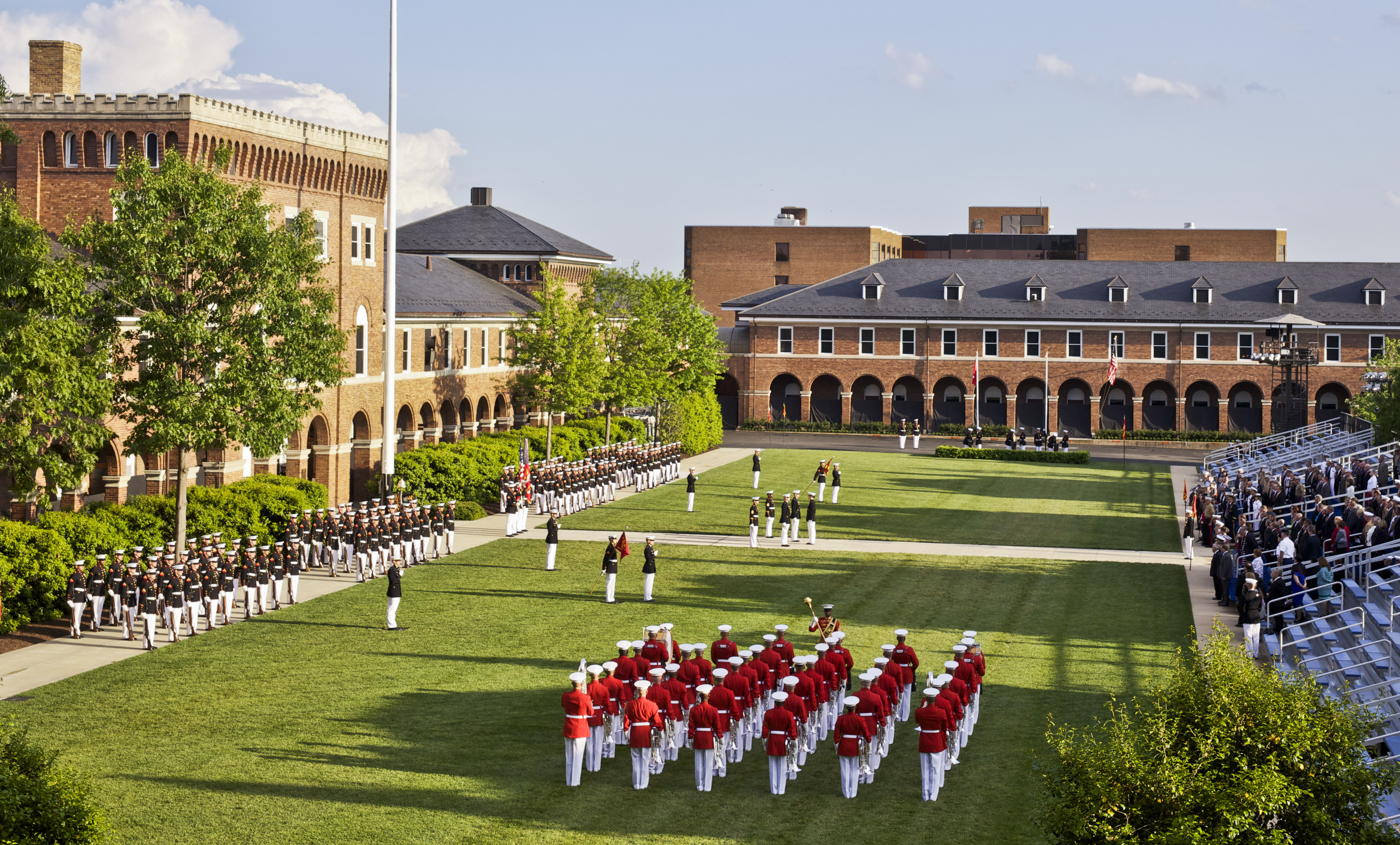
The Marine Barracks, established in 1801, are the oldest U.S. Marines facility and their main ceremonial ground. It is also the residence of the Commandant of the Marine Corps.

The neighborhood that is now called Capitol Hill started to develop when the government began work at two locations, the Capitol and the Washington Navy Yard. It became a distinct community between 1799 and 1810 as the federal government became a major employer. The first stage in its early history was that of a boarding house community developed for members of Congress. In the early years of the Republic, few Congressmen wished to establish permanent residence in the city. Instead, most preferred to live in boarding houses within walking distance of the Capitol.

In 1799, the Washington Navy Yard was established on the banks of the Anacostia River, providing jobs to craftsmen who built and repaired ships. Many of the craftsmen who were employed both at the Navy Yard and in the construction of the Capitol chose to live within walking distance, to the east of the Capitol and the north of the Navy Yard. They became the original residential population of the neighborhood.

=== 19th century ===
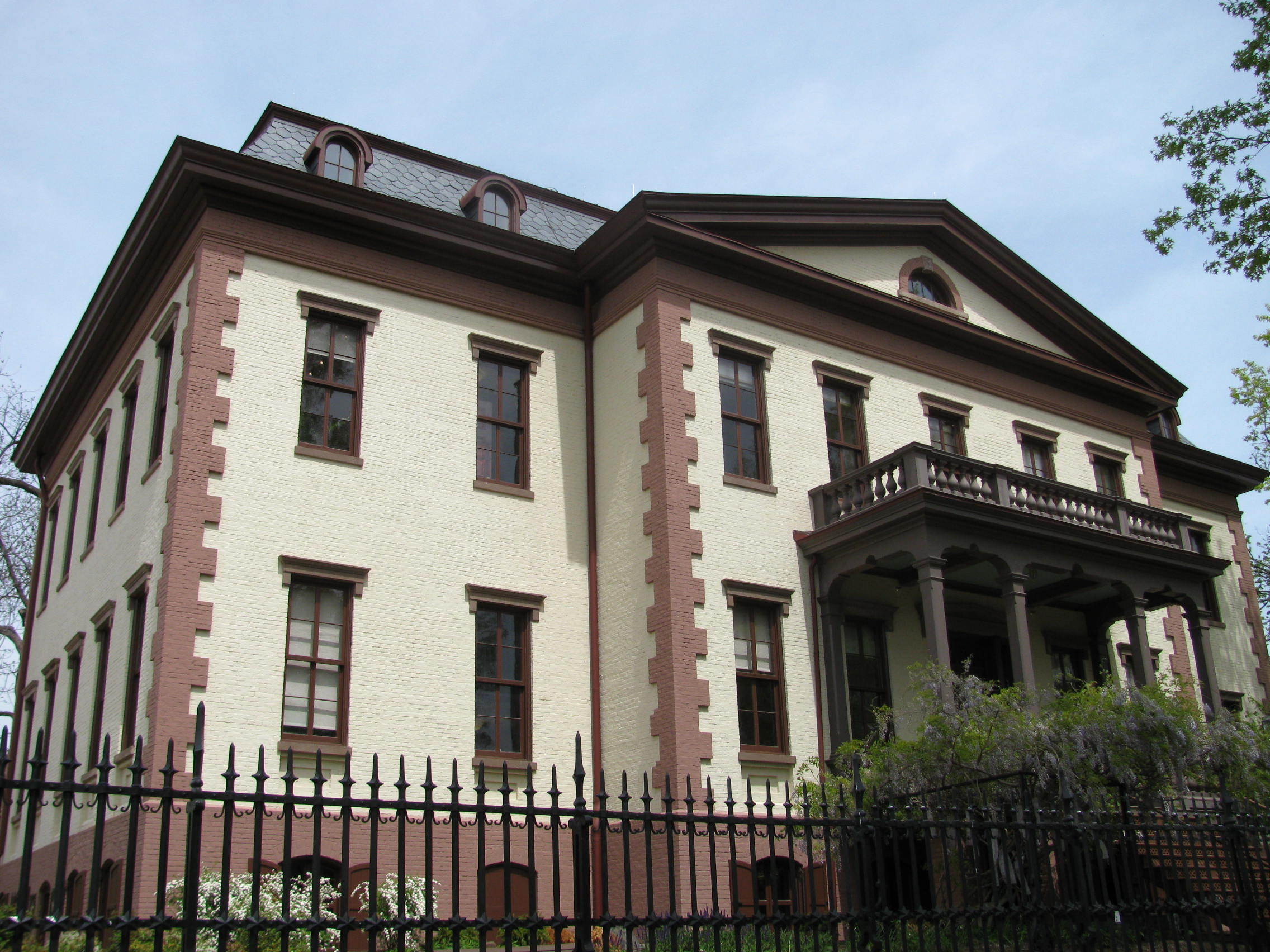
Old Naval Hospital, built in 1866

In 1801, Thomas Jefferson, who was at the time President of the United States, selected the location of the Marine Barracks, which had to be within marching distance of both the Capitol and the White House, near the Washington Navy Yard. By 1810, shops, goldsmiths, blacksmiths, and churches were flourishing in the area.

The Civil War resulted in more construction in the Capitol Hill area, including the building of hospitals. Construction of new houses continued in the 1870s and 1880s. The neighborhood began to divide along racial and economic class lines. Electricity, piped water, and plumbing were introduced in the 1890s, and were first available in the downtown areas of the District of Columbia, including Capitol Hill. There was a real estate development boom between 1890 and 1910 as the Capitol Hill area became one of the first neighborhoods having these modern conveniences.

=== 20th century ===
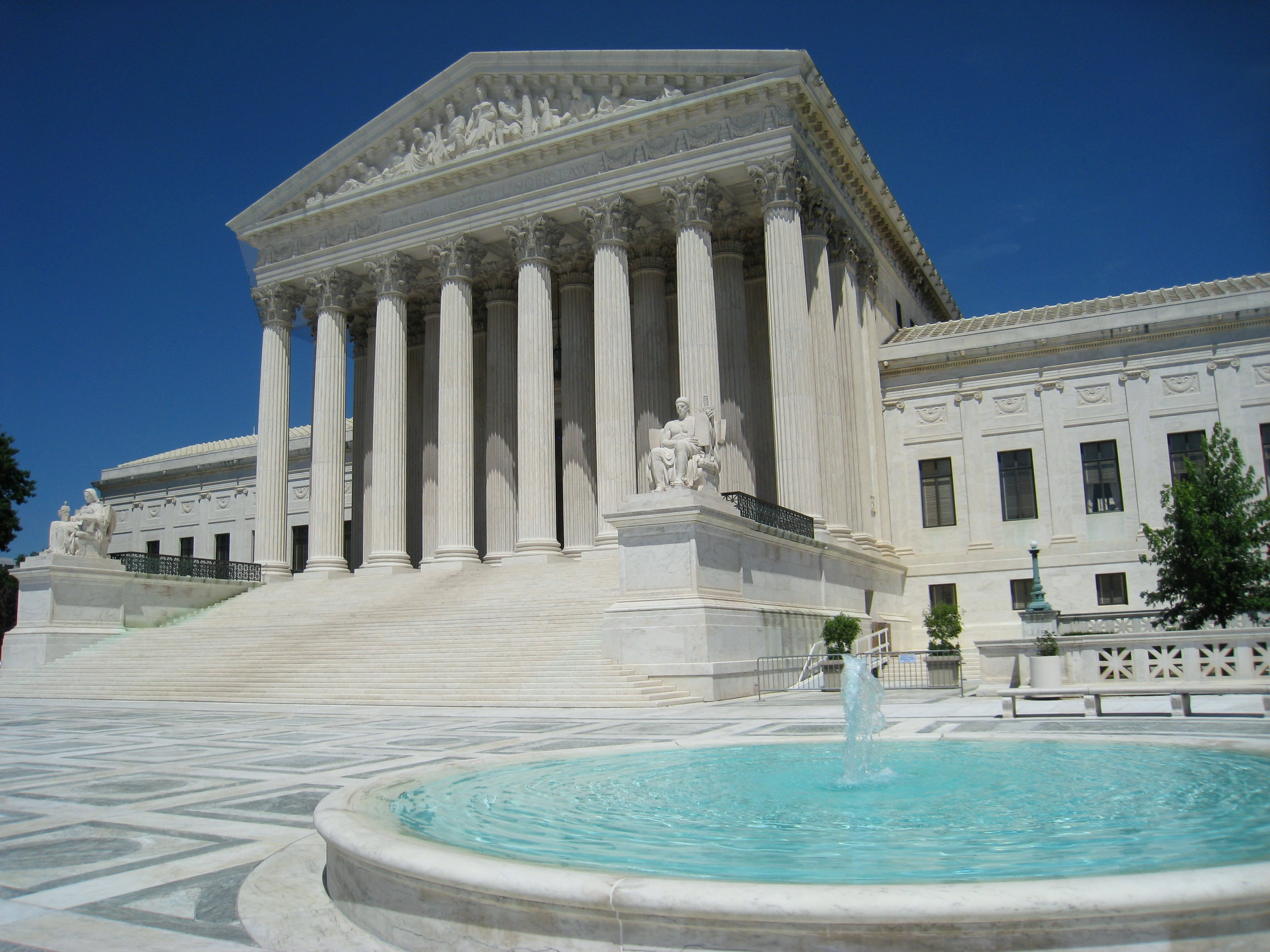
The Supreme Court, built in 1935

In 1976, the Capitol Hill Historic District was placed on the National Register of Historic Places. It is one of the largest historic districts in the United States. The boundaries of the historic district are irregular, extending southward from F Street NE, as far east as 15th Street, as far west as South Capitol Street, and with a southern limit marked chiefly by Virginia Avenue but including some territory as far south as M Street SE. It includes buildings from the Federal period (1800 to 1820) through 1919, but most of the buildings are late Victorian.

Capitol Hill has remained a fairly stable middle-class neighborhood throughout its existence. It suffered a period of economic decline and rising crime in the mid-20th century but gradually recovered. During the so-called "crack epidemic" of the 1980s, its fringes were often affected. Beginning in the 1990s, the neighborhood has undergone intense gentrification.

== Landmarks ==
Capitol Hill's landmarks include not only the United States Capitol, but also the Senate and House office buildings, the Supreme Court building, the Library of Congress, the Marine Barracks, the Washington Navy Yard, and Congressional Cemetery, which are collectively part of the Capitol Complex.

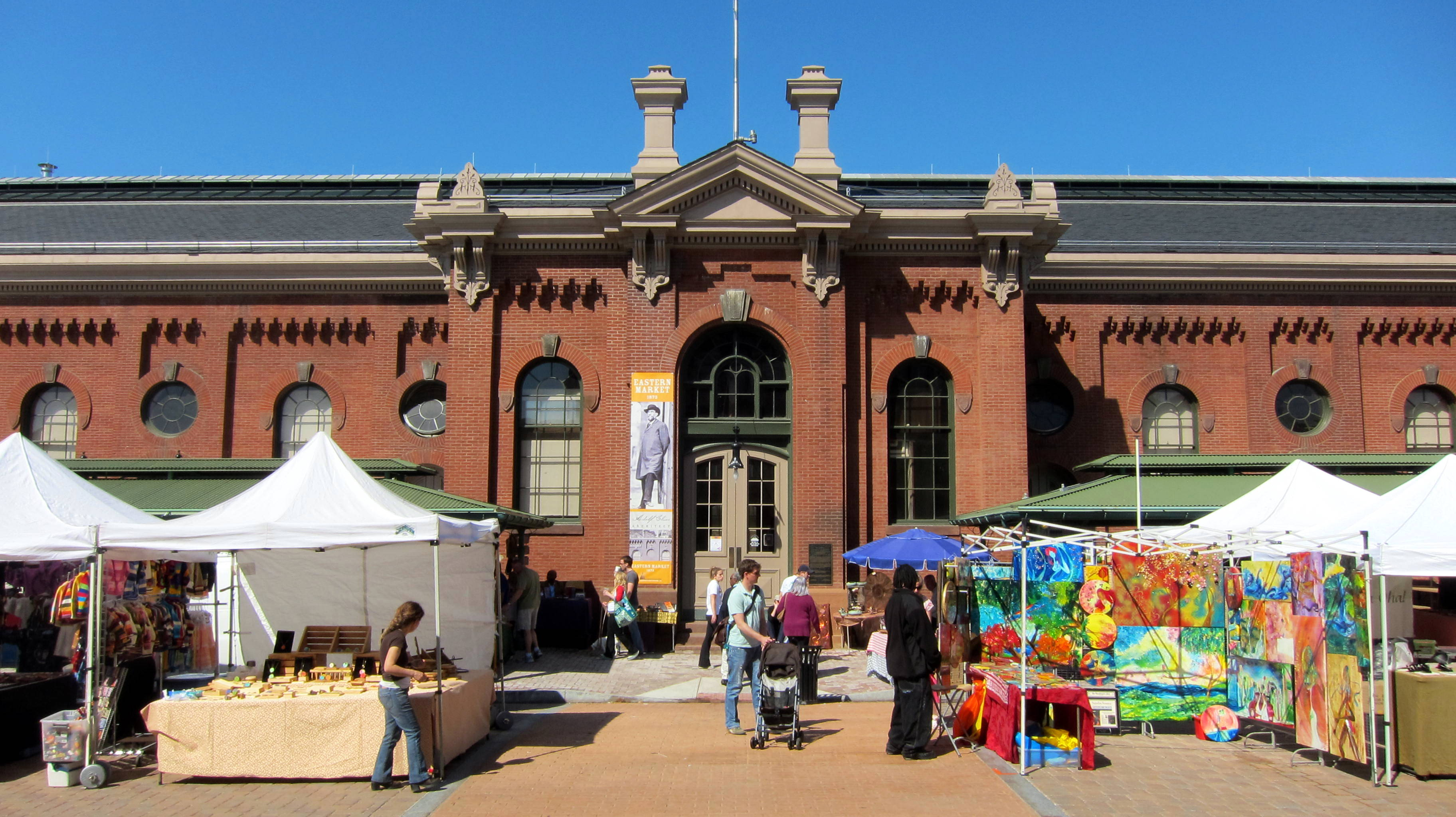
Eastern Market, a public market and food hall, was built in 1873.

Also, the Folger Shakespeare Library is located in Capitol Hill. It is a research library and museum that houses the world's largest collection of material related to English writer William Shakespeare and third-largest collection of English books printed before 1641. The Folger Library houses a large museum and also operates the Folger Theatre, which is known for being a leading interpreter of Shakespeare's works.

Capitol Hill is, however, largely a residential neighborhood composed predominantly of rowhouses of different stylistic varieties and periods. Side by side exist early 19th century manor houses, Federal townhouses, small frame dwellings, ornate Italianate bracketed houses, and the late 19th century press brick rowhouses with their often whimsical decorative elements combining Richardsonian Romanesque, Queen Anne, and Eastlakian motifs.

In the 1990s, gentrification and the booming economy of the District of Columbia meant that the neighborhood's non-historic and obsolete buildings began to be replaced. New buildings, which have to comply with height limits and other restrictions, are often done in a decorative modernist style, many by Amy Weinstein, whose designs feature polychrome brickwork set in patterned relief.

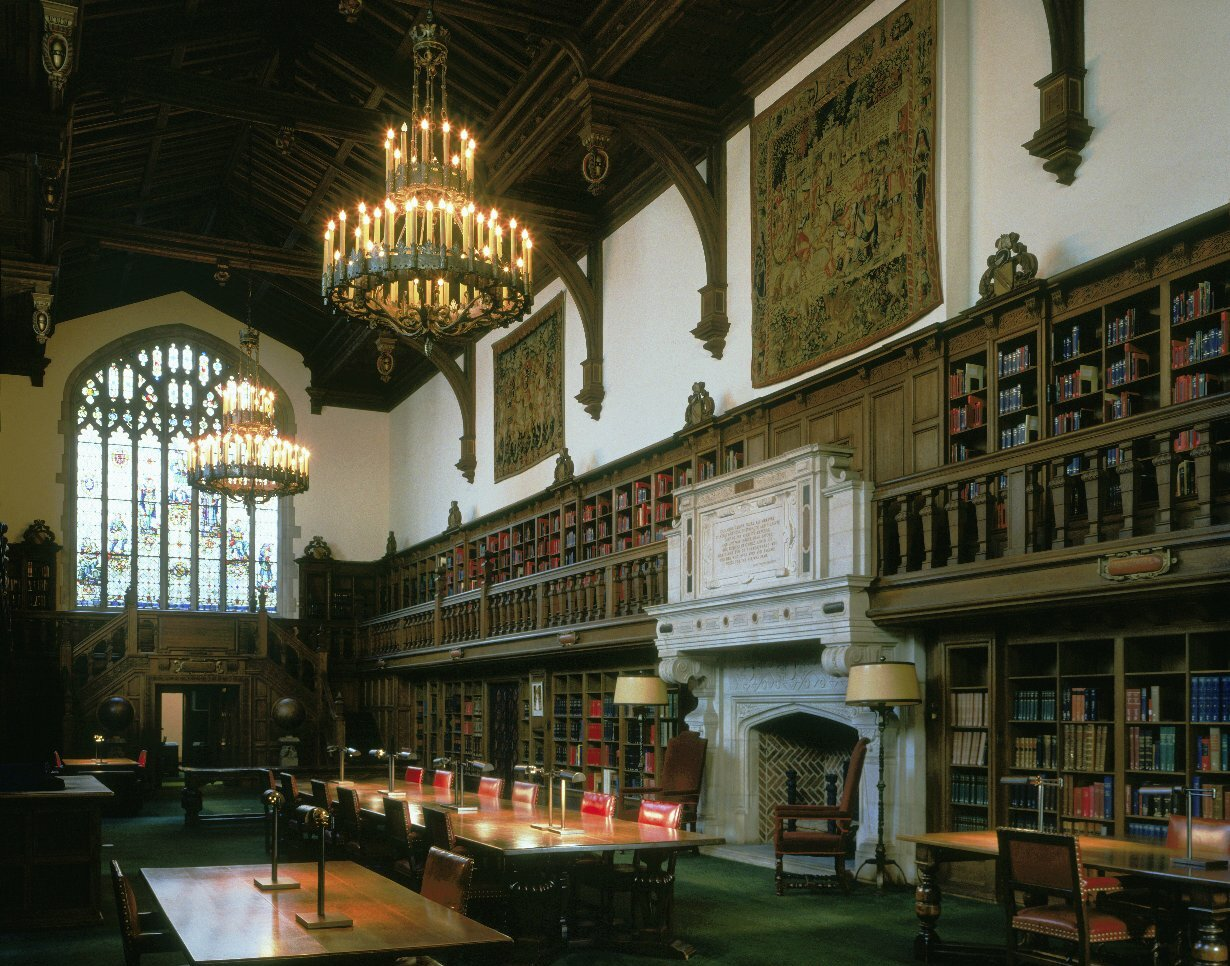
The Folger Shakespeare Library, the world's largest collection of works by William Shakespeare and a primary repository for rare materials from the early modern period of Europe

The main retail corridor of Capitol Hill is Pennsylvania Avenue, a lively commercial street with shops, restaurants and bars. Eastern Market is an 1873 public market on 7th Street SE, where vendors sell fresh meat and produce in indoor stalls and at outdoor farmers' stands. It is also the site of an outdoor flea market every weekend. After a major fire gutted the main market building on April 30, 2007, it underwent restoration and reopened on June 26, 2009. One of the most beloved stores, Fragers Hardware, has been based on Pennsylvania Avenue for nearly 100 years before it suffered a fire similar in destructiveness to the Eastern Market fire. It has successfully rebuilt on the same location.

Barracks Row at 8th Street SE, named because of its proximity to the U.S. Marine Barracks, is one of the city's oldest commercial corridors. It dates to the late 18th century and has recently been revitalized. Barracks Row is located immediately south of Eastern Market, which is a public market dating back to 1871. The Eastern Market and Barracks Row area have many restaurants and shops. This area is the oldest commercial district in the city, in part due to its proximity to the Washington Navy Yard.

A new addition to Capitol Hill is a community center named Hill Center. Hill Center is housed in the restored Old Naval Hospital at the corner of 9th and Pennsylvania Avenue SE.

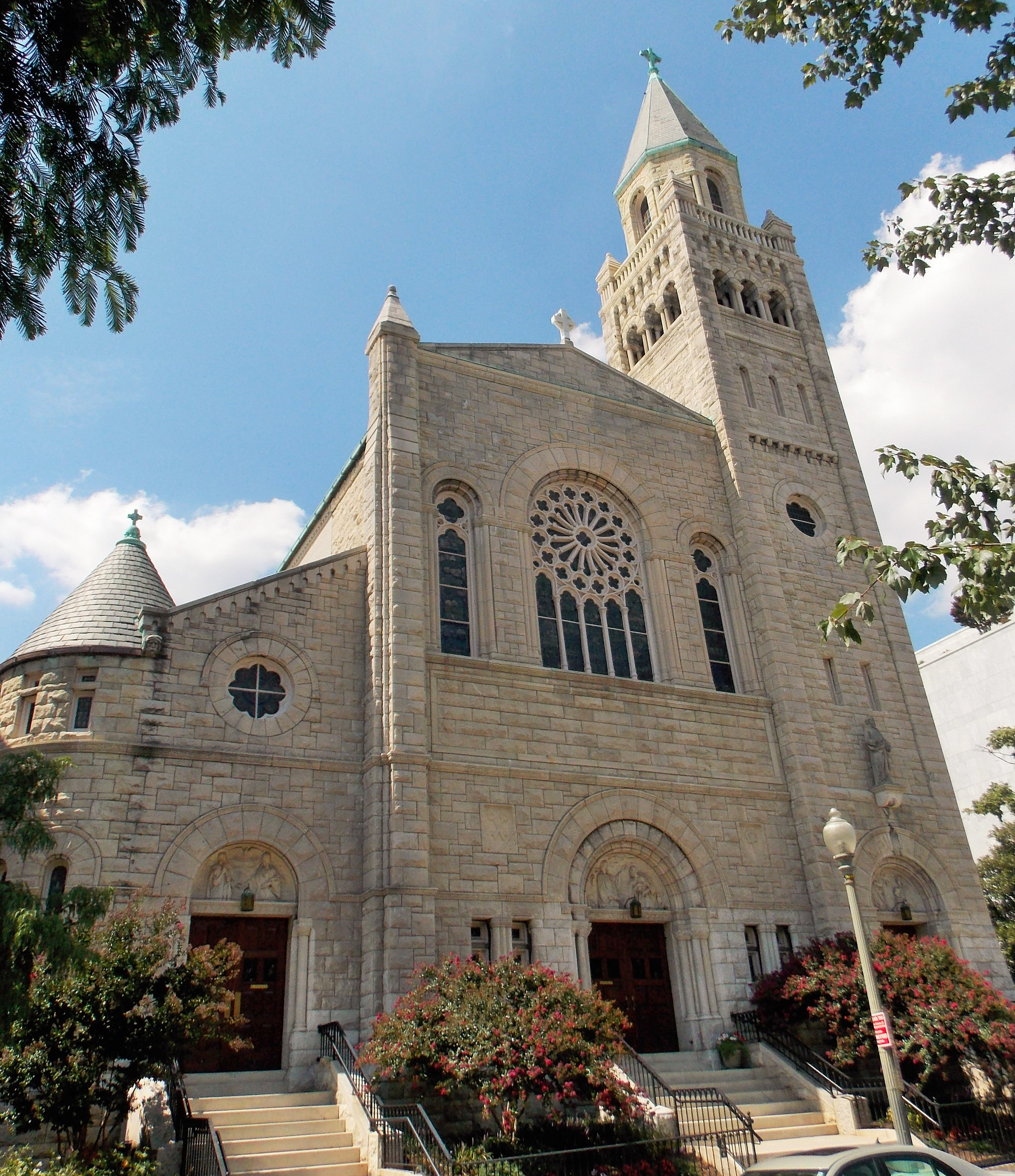
St. Peter's Church

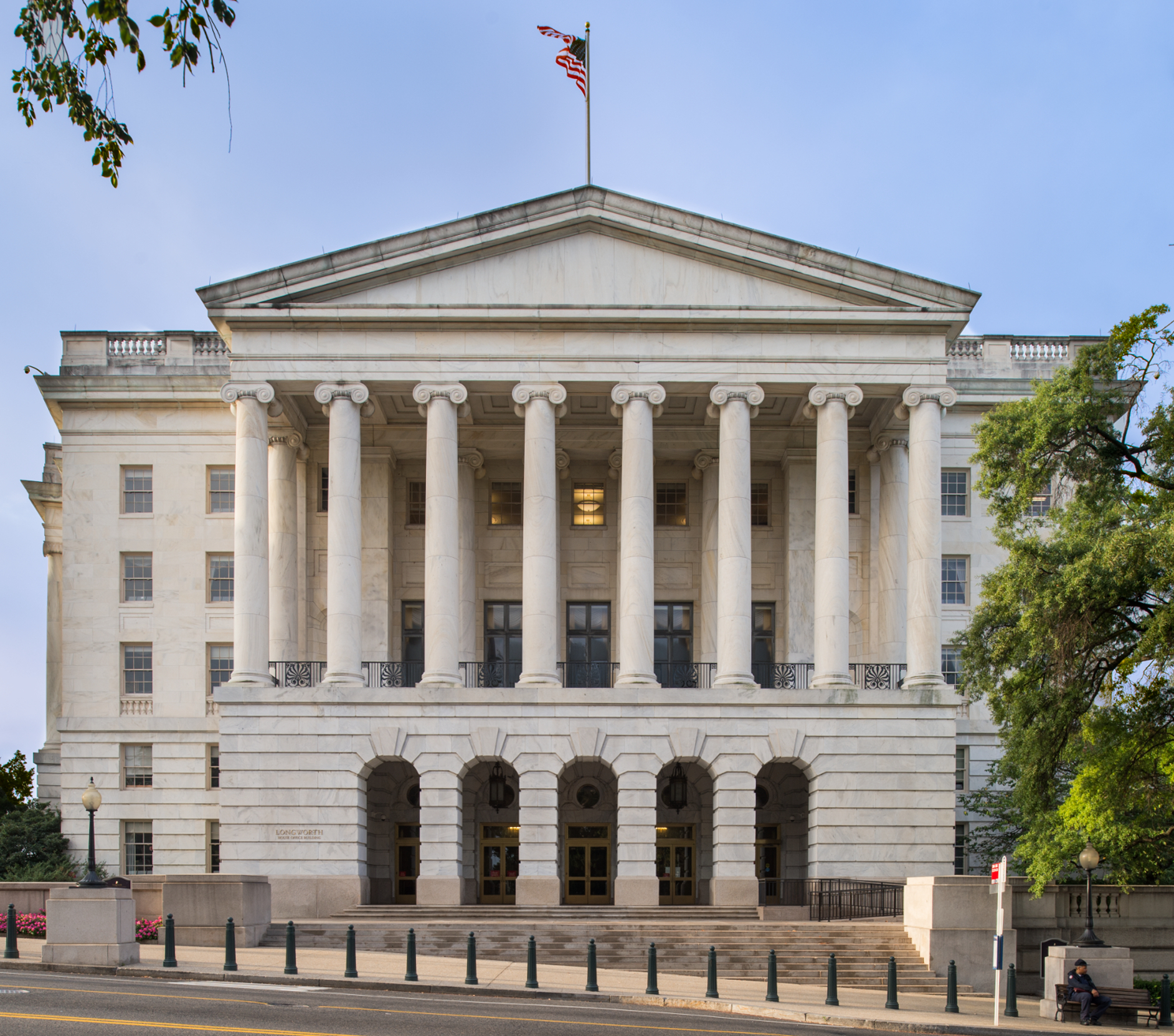
Longworth House Building

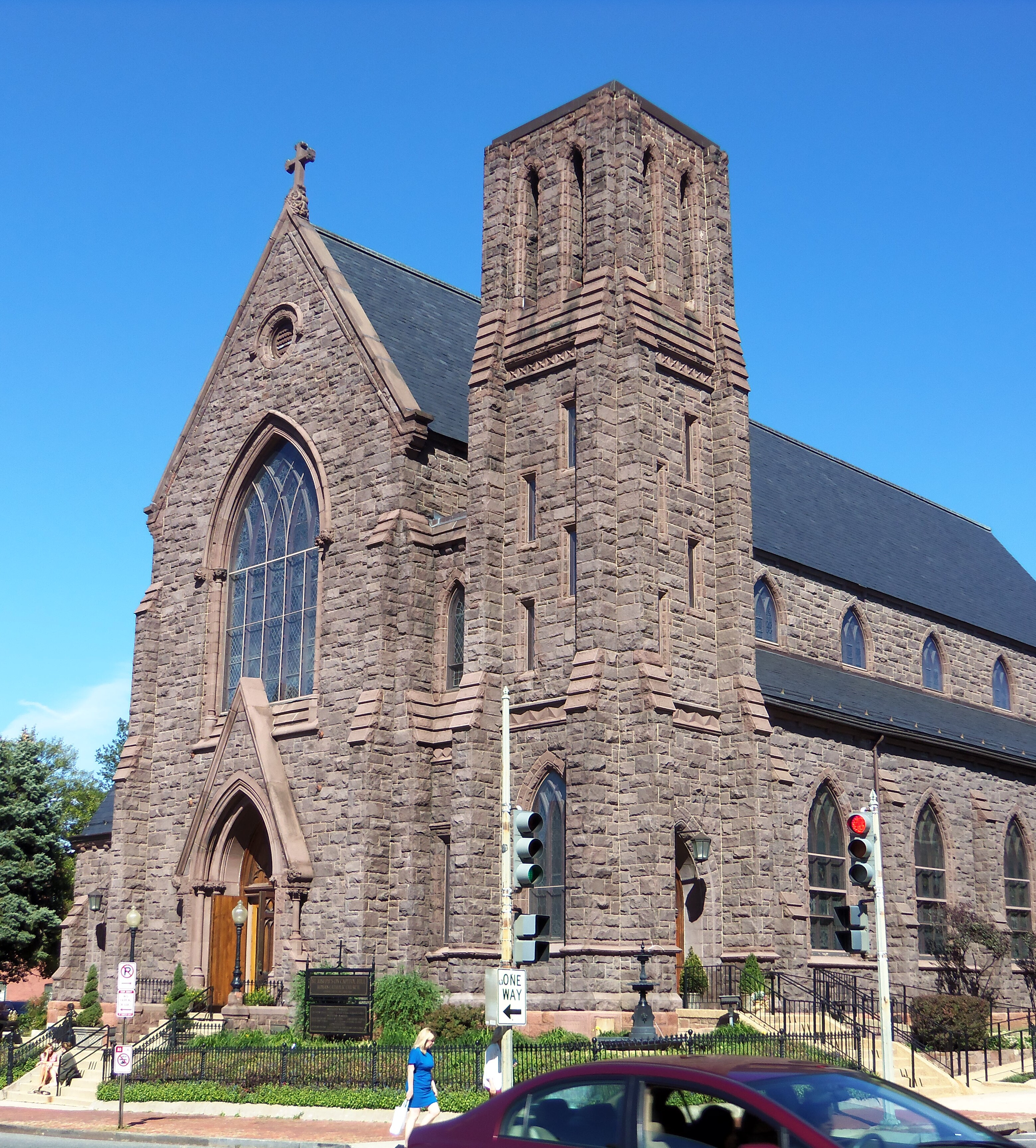
St. Joseph's Church

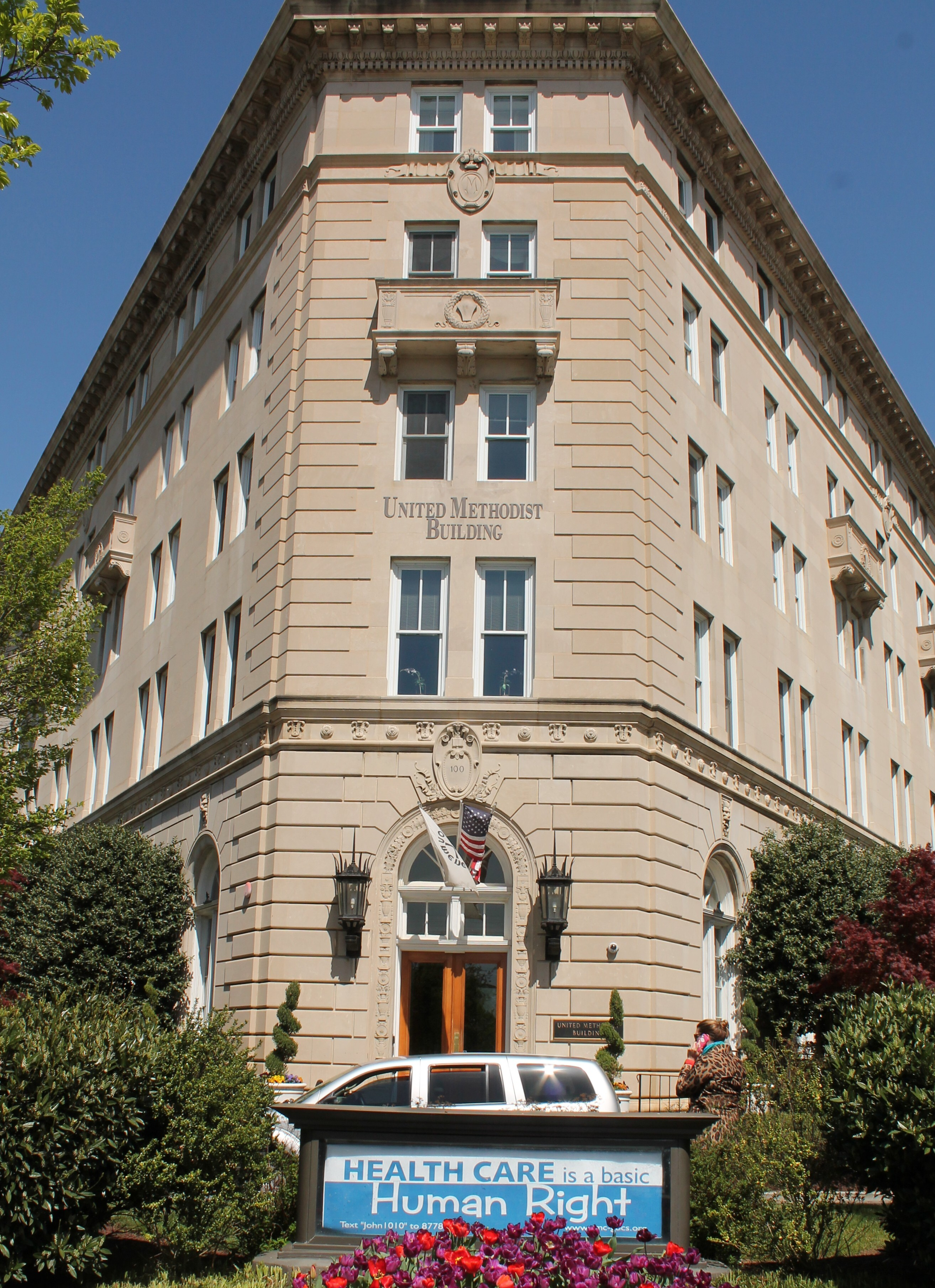
United Methodist Building

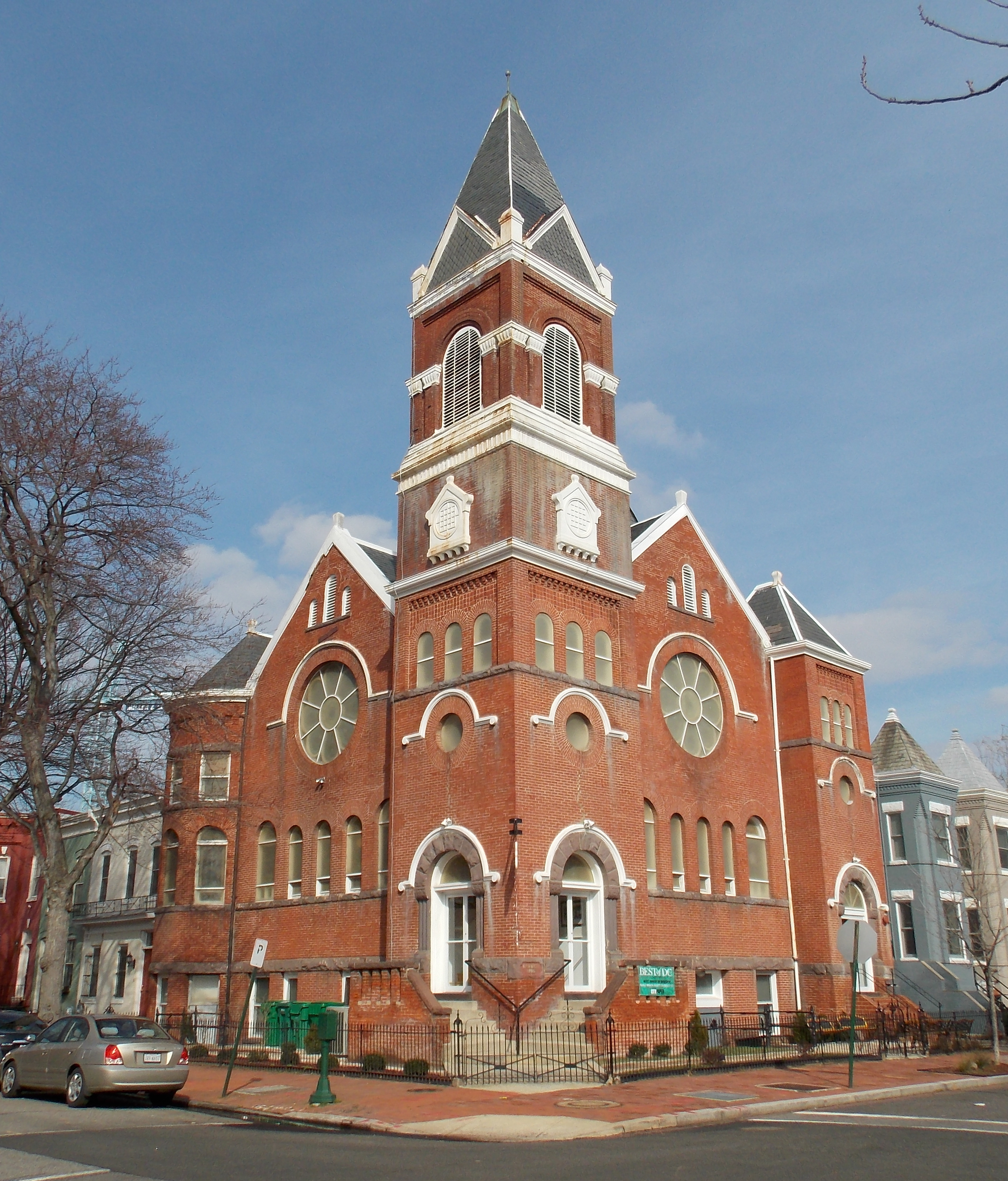
World Mission Society Church of God

Federal rowhomes

=== Parks ===
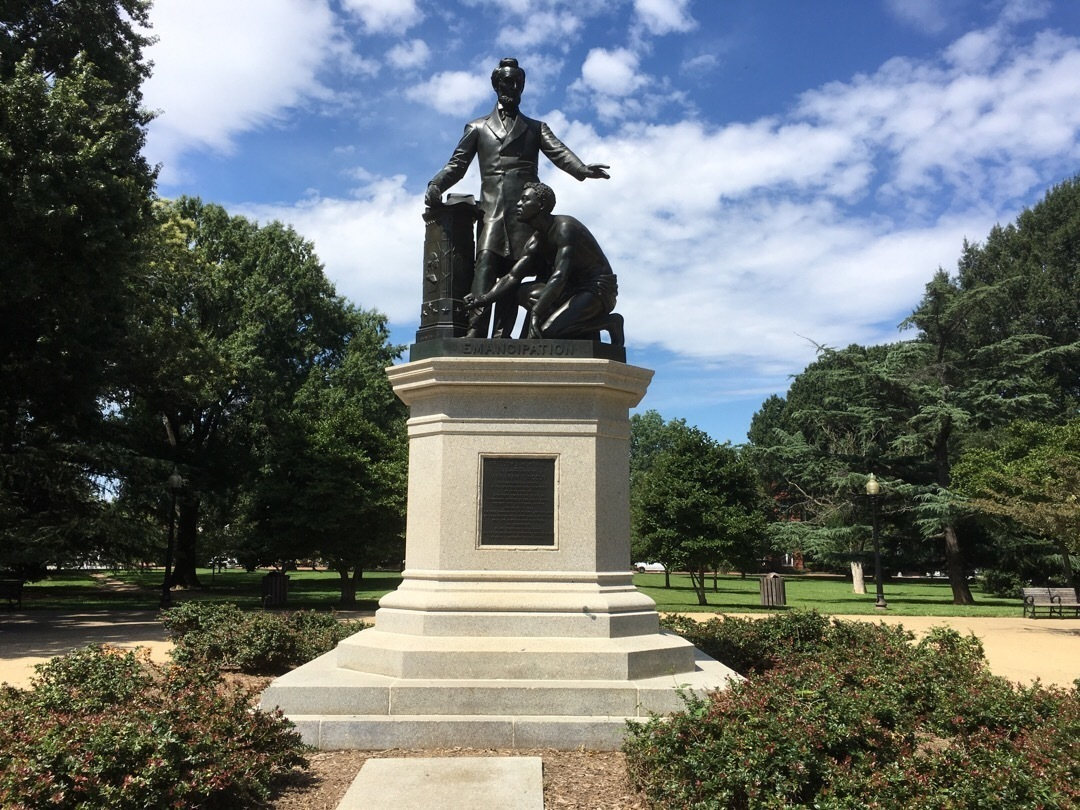
The Emancipation Memorial at Lincoln Park, erected in 1876

The Capitol Hill neighborhood is home to many parks and squares. Lincoln Park is located immediately east of the U.S. Capitol on East Capitol Street. It is home to Thomas Ball's controversial Emancipation Memorial as well as Robert Berks' statue of Mary McLeod Bethune. At the intersection between Maryland Avenue and Massachusetts Avenue on the northern part of the neighborhood is Stanton Park. The park is named after Edwin Stanton, who was U.S. Secretary of War during the American Civil War.

Located immediately south of the U.S. Capitol is Spirit of Justice Park, which is separated into two identically sized sections by South Capitol Street. Southeast of this park is Folger Park, which was named after former Secretary of the Treasury Charles J. Folger. At the intersection of Pennsylvania Avenue and North Carolina Avenue is Seward Square. Since those two roads intersect diagonally in the middle of the square, Sward Square is divided into four triangular sections. A couple blocks immediately south of this square is the location of Marion Park. This park goes by the name Turtle Park because of a large cement turtle in its playground. On the southern edge of the neighborhood is Garfield Park, named after President James Garfield.

== Education ==
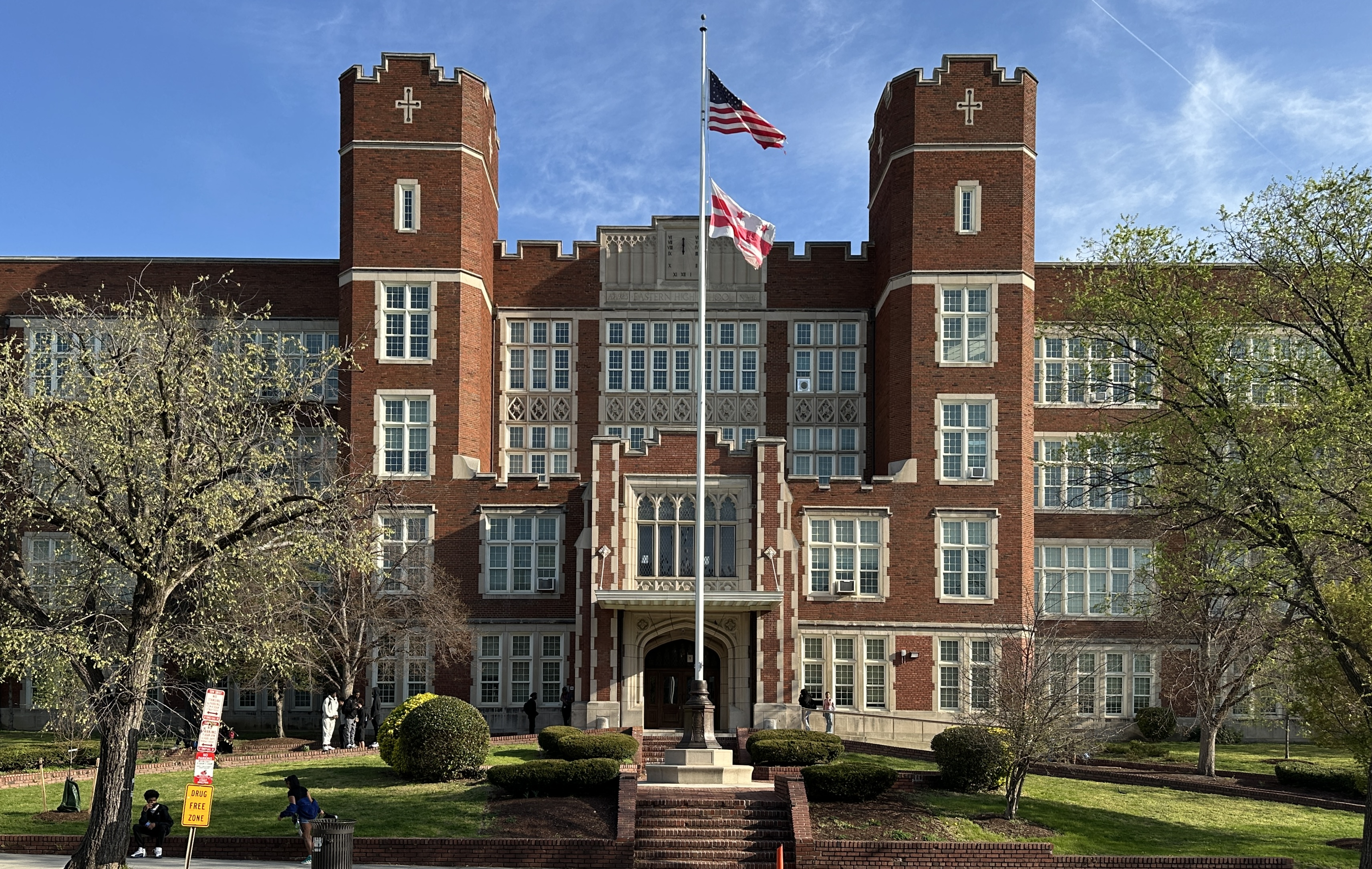
Eastern High School

Capitol Hill is served by the District of Columbia Public Schools. Boundary schools include:

- Brent Elementary School
- Maury Elementary School
- Payne Elementary School
- Shirley Chisholm Elementary School
- Elliot-Hine Middle School
- Eastern High School

The Capitol Hill Cluster School, which operates under DC Public Schools, has three campuses.

- Peabody Elementary School (PK3-Kindergarten)
- Watkins Elementary School (1st-5th Grades)
- Stuart-Hobson Middle School (6th-8th Grades)

Capitol Hill is also home to independent schools including St. Peters Catholic School and Capitol Hill Day School.

== Notable residents ==
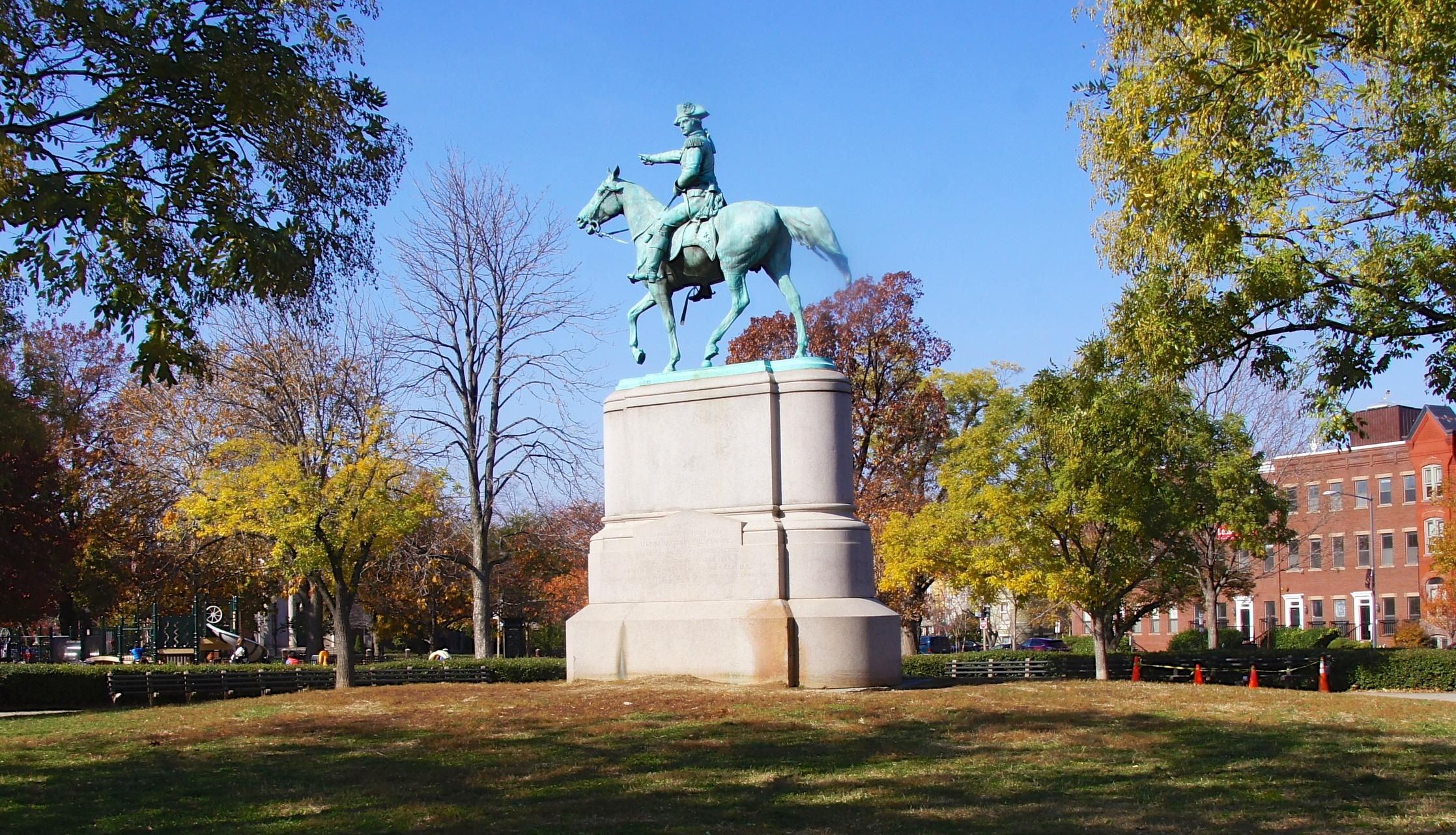
The Equestrian statue of Nathanael Greene at Stanton Park

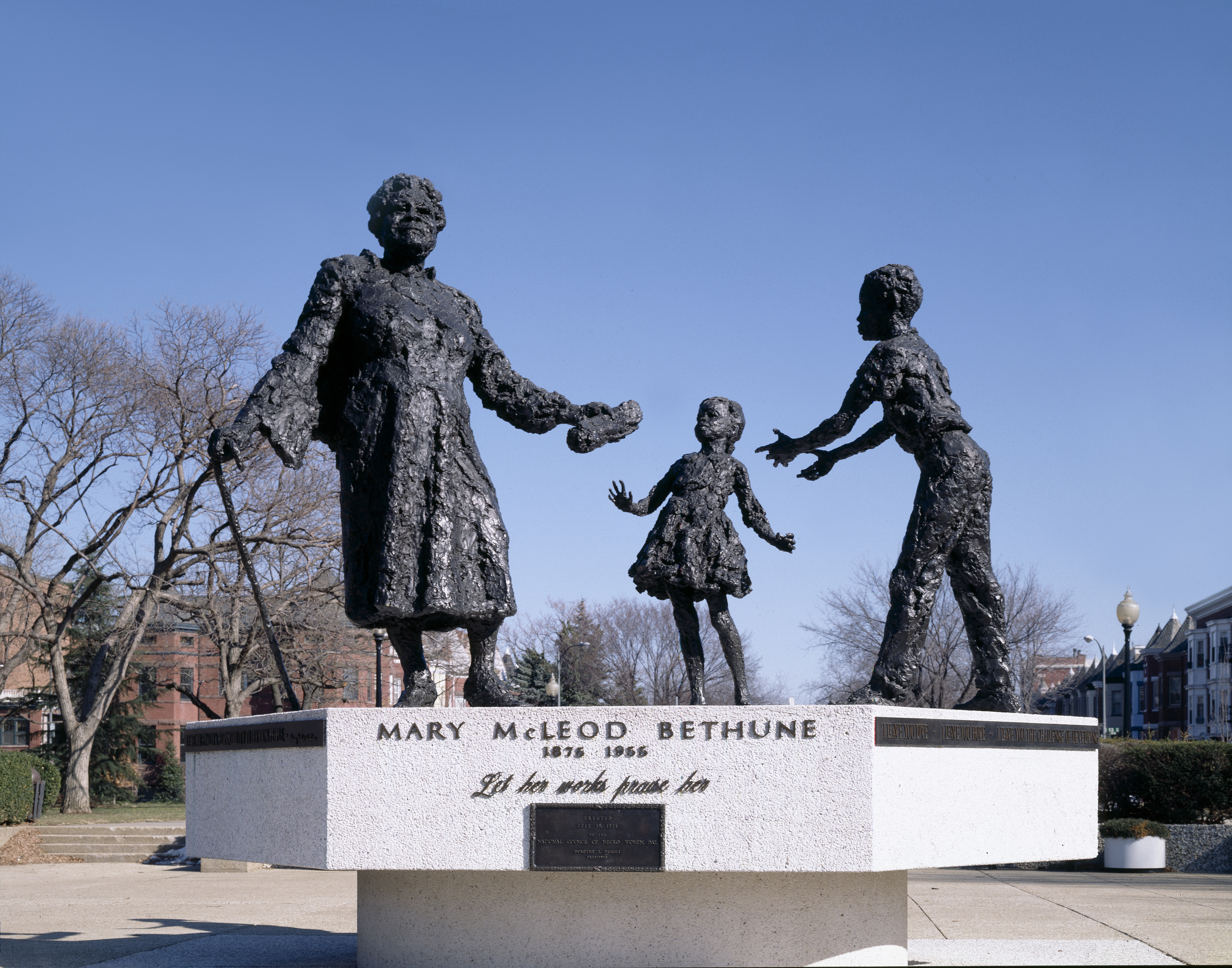
The Mary McLeod Bethune Memorial at Lincoln Park

- John S. Barbour Jr., U.S. senator
- Porter H. Dale, U.S. senator
- Frederick Douglass, social reformer and abolitionist
- Isaac Fulwood, former chief of the Metropolitan Police
- Albert Gallatin, former U.S. secretary of the treasury and U.S. senator
- Ana Gasteyer, actress and comedian
- J. Edgar Hoover, first director of the FBI
- Hiram Johnson, 23rd governor of California
- Reverdy Johnson, former U.S. attorney general and U.S. senator
- Phil Mendelson, current chairman of the D.C. Council
- Bernie Sanders, U.S. senator
- John Philip Sousa, famed composer
- Jerome Sykes, stage actor and comedian
- George Watterston, third librarian of Congress
