= James Barker Edmonds =

American politician (1832–1900)

4th President of the Board of Commissioners of Washington, D.C.
- In office March 29, 1883 – January 1, 1886
- President: Chester A. Arthur; Grover Cleveland
- Preceded by: Joseph R. West
- Succeeded by: William Benning Webb

Member of the Board of Commissioners of Washington, D.C.
- In office March 8, 1883 – January 1, 1886
- President: Chester A. Arthur; Grover Cleveland
- Preceded by: Thomas Phillips Morgan
- Succeeded by: Samuel Edwin Wheatley

Personal details
- Born: May 20, 1832 Saratoga County, New York, U.S.
- Died: December 29, 1900 (aged 68) Washington, D.C., U.S.
- Resting place: Rock Creek Cemetery; Washington, D.C., U.S.
- Party: Democratic
- Profession: Attorney, Politician

James Barker Edmonds (May 20, 1832 – December 29, 1900) was president of the board of commissioners for the District of Columbia, United States, from 1883 to 1886.

Edmonds was born in Saratoga County, New York. He began the study of the law early and was only 21 when he was admitted to the New York State bar in 1853 and entered practice. Three years later, in 1856, Edmonds relocated to Iowa City, Iowa, then the capital of the state, where he opened a law partnership with Charles T. Ransom and grew the firm into one of the most prestigious and wealthy in the Midwest.

Edmonds successfully practiced law in Iowa for 19 years, but in 1875 his poor health force him to relocate to Washington, D.C., where he settled into a retirement from the legal practice but remained a sought-after consultant for other attorneys in the city.

When former Louisiana Senator Joseph Rodman West resigned from the D.C. Board of Commissioners in 1883, President Chester A. Arthur nominated Edmonds to serve as the board's Democratic commissioner and he served as President of the commission. Edmonds served as president of the commission from March 3, 1883, to April 1, 1886, at which time both his presidency and his term as a commissioner expired. President Grover Cleveland offered him reappointment, but Edmonds turned it down. According to The Washington Post, "Mr. Edmonds was one of the most efficient and popular officials of those who have presided over the affairs of the district, and his refusal to accept a renomination for office was greatly regretted."

Edmonds died at his home on K Street in Washington on December 29, 1900, at the age of sixty-nine and was buried in Rock Creek Cemetery.

James Barker Edmonds Elementary School in Washington, DC was named in his honor in 1903. It closed in the 1970s and was occupied at various times by a credit union, the National Association for Equal Opportunity in Higher Education, the Associates for Renewal in Education and a daycare center. In 2014 it became a condominium known as the Edmonds School.

== Sources ==
- http://www.rootsweb.com/~iabiog/iastbios/ih1885/ih1885-e.htm - Contains Edmonds' obituary from The Washington Post.

Political offices
Preceded by Joseph Rodman West	President of the D.C. Board of Commissioners; 1883 — 1886	Succeeded by William Benning Webb
