= John S. Harris =

American politician (1825–1906)

John Spafford Harris
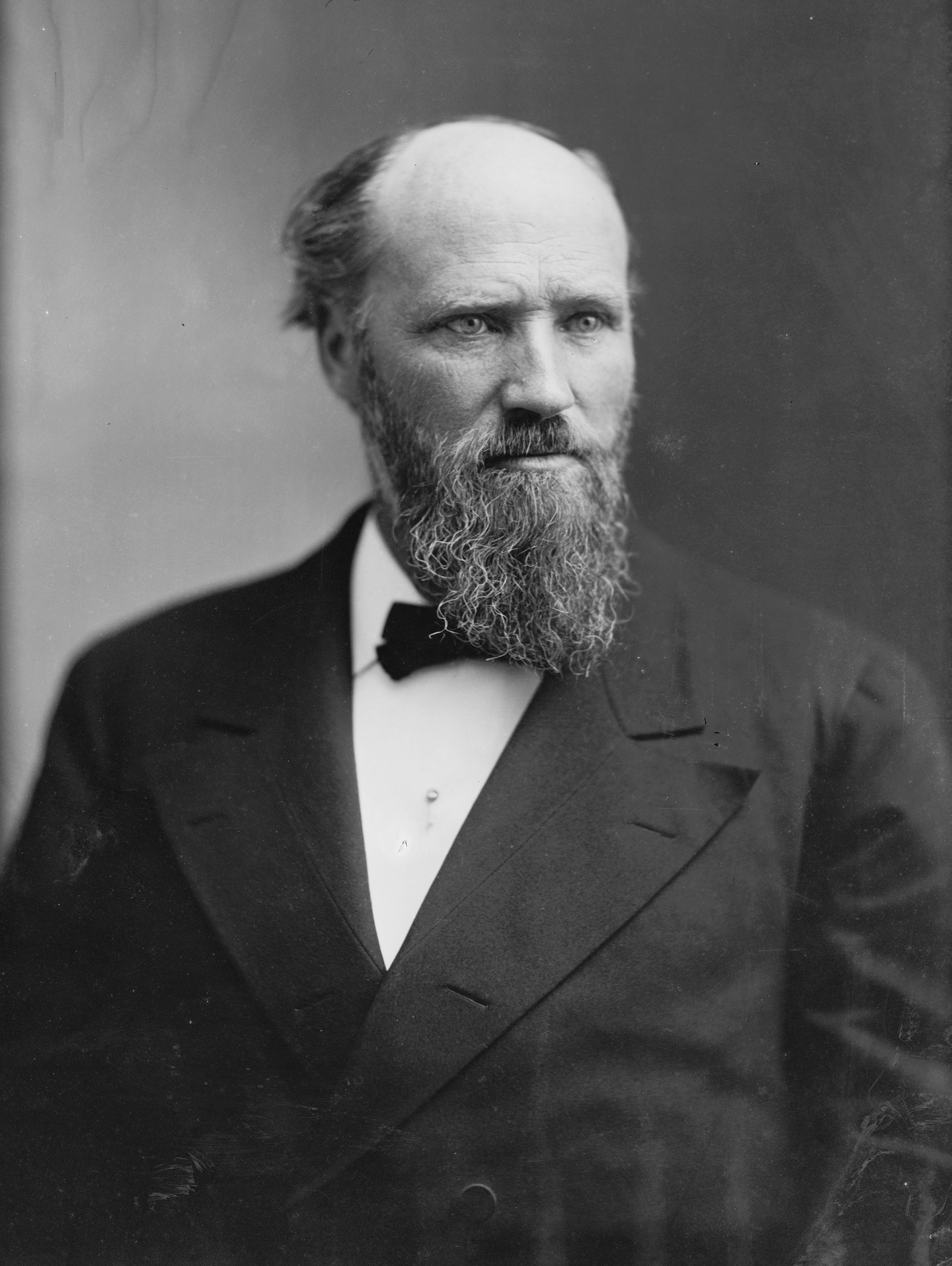

United States Senator from Louisiana
- In office July 8, 1868 – March 3, 1871
- Preceded by: Judah P. Benjamin
- Succeeded by: Joseph R. West

Personal details
- Born: December 18, 1825 Truxton, New York, USA
- Died: January 25, 1906 (aged 80) Butte, Montana, USA
- Resting place: Forestvale Cemetery in Helena, Montana
- Party: Republican

John Spafford Harris (December 18, 1825 – January 25, 1906) was an American politician for the state of Louisiana and member of the Republican Party. Born to a farm family in Truxton, New York, Harris was a delegate to the Louisiana state constitutional convention in 1868. He was a member of Louisiana State Senate in 1868 and the first Republican U.S. Senator from Louisiana, serving from 1868 to 1871. Harris was buried at Forestvale Cemetery in Helena, Montana.

== Education ==
Harris attended the common schools, and received some college education during his time in Milwaukee, Wisconsin.

== Career ==
After the death of his mother, Harris accompanied his father to Milwaukee, Wisconsin, in 1846. Initially employed as clerk in a mercantile establishment, he worked as a merchant, real estate dealer, and banker. He eventually rose to be president of Milwaukee's Marine Bank.

In the fall of 1863, traveled to Memphis, Tennessee but found it strictly blockaded by federal authorities. Consequently, he resolved to return home via New Orleans and New York. An accident happened and his boat was detained in Natchez, Mississippi, where he was induced to lease one of the largest cotton plantations in Louisiana. By the end of the American Civil War, he had become one of the biggest planters in Louisiana.

He became increasingly involved in politics by organizing local freedmen into clubs and instructing them about their new political rights. As a member of the Republican Party, he took a moderate course, and was seen by the New Orleans Picayune as "one of the mildest and most temperate Republicans", although the New Orleans Republican noted that he was an abolitionist. He was sworn in as a state senator on June 29, 1868. Nine days later, he was nominated to serve as a US senator for the short term ending in 1871. He succeeded Judah P. Benjamin who had withdrawn from the Senate previous to the war. His nomination was confirmed by both houses. He completed his term on March 3, 1871.

Harris was appointed surveyor general for the state of Montana by President Chester Arthur in 1881.

== Death ==
Harris died in Butte, Montana on January 25, 1906, and is buried in Helena, Montana.

U.S. Senate
Preceded by Judah P. Benjamin^{(1)}	U.S. senator (Class 2) from Louisiana; 1868–1871; Served alongside: William P. Kellogg	Succeeded by Joseph R. West
Notes and references
1. Because of Louisiana's secession from the Union, the Senate seat was vacant from 1861 to 1868 when Judah P. Benjamin withdrew from the Senate.
