= John Watkinson Douglass =

American politician

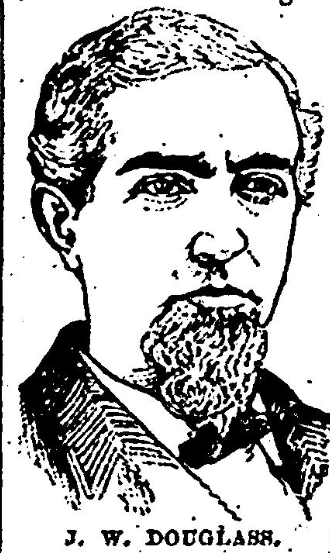

6th President of the Board of Commissioners of Washington, D.C.
- In office May 21, 1889 – March 1, 1893
- President: Benjamin Harrison; Grover Cleveland
- Preceded by: William Benning Webb
- Succeeded by: John Wesley Ross

7th Commissioner of Internal Revenue
- In office August 9, 1871 – May 14, 1875
- President: Ulysses S. Grant
- Preceded by: Alfred Pleasonton
- Succeeded by: Daniel D. Pratt
- Acting; November 1, 1870 – January 2, 1871
- President: Ulysses S. Grant
- Preceded by: Columbus Delano
- Succeeded by: Alfred Pleasonton

Personal details
- Born: October 25, 1827 Philadelphia, Pennsylvania, U.S.
- Died: August 21, 1909 (aged 81) Kent, Connecticut, U.S.
- Resting place: Oak Hill Cemetery; Georgetown, Washington, D.C., U.S.
- Party: Republican
- Spouse: Margaret Lyon
- Children: 5
- Profession: Attorney, Politician

John Watkinson Douglass (October 25, 1827 – August 21, 1909) was an American politician who served as the 6th president of the Board of Commissioners of the District of Columbia from 1889 to 1893 and as the 7th commissioner of internal revenue from 1871 to 1875. Prior to that, he was the acting commissioner of internal revenue from 1870 to 1871.

== Early life ==
Born on October 25, 1827, in Philadelphia, Pennsylvania, J. W. Douglass was the son of Joseph M. Douglass (1834–1905) and Martha A. Watkinson Douglass. He was from a distinguished Pennsylvania family, descended from Paul Lily White, who had helped explore the state with William Penn and Col. John Douglass, who fought with George Washington in the American Revolution. Douglass moved to Erie, Pennsylvania, when he was 10 and graduated from the Erie Academy. He was apprenticed to the Hon. James Thompson and admitted to the bar of Erie in 1851.

== Public life ==
He became involved in Republican politics and campaigned hard for Abraham Lincoln, with whom he would later become friends, in 1860. He was awarded with an appointment as Collector of Internal Revenue for the 19th Pennsylvania district in Erie in 1861 when the Internal Revenue Service was started. In 1869 he was promoted to 1st deputy commissioner of internal revenue, bringing him to Washington, DC. From October 1869 to January 1871 he was acting commissioner of internal revenue; from August 9, 1871, to May 14, 1875, he was the commissioner. His portrait was on an issue of tobacco revenue stamps in 1875. He then retired to private practice in Washington, D.C., where he practiced law before the different courts of the district, the executive departments, the Court of Claims and the Supreme Court. He led the reorganization, streamlining and standardization of the Revenue Service, allowing them to cut the number of employees by more than 60%. He became friends with President Grant, who had wanted to place him on the Court of Claims, but no vacancy occurred.

In 1889, he was appointed to the three-person board of commissioners by President Benjamin Harrison and was elected president of the board. During his time he drafted a liquor license law that was passed by Congress.

== Later life ==
He married Margaret Lyon (1830–1910). He died August 21, 1909, in Kent, Connecticut, where he was visiting his daughters, and was buried at Oak Hill Cemetery in Washington.

His son, George Lyon Douglass, was Speaker of the Kansas House of Representatives in 1893.

Political offices
Preceded by William Benning Webb	President of the D.C. Board of Commissioners; 1889-1893	Succeeded by John Wesley Ross

Government offices
Preceded by Alfred Pleasonton	Commissioner of Internal Revenue; 2018–present	Succeeded by Daniel D. Pratt
