= William Benning Webb =

American politician (1825–1896)

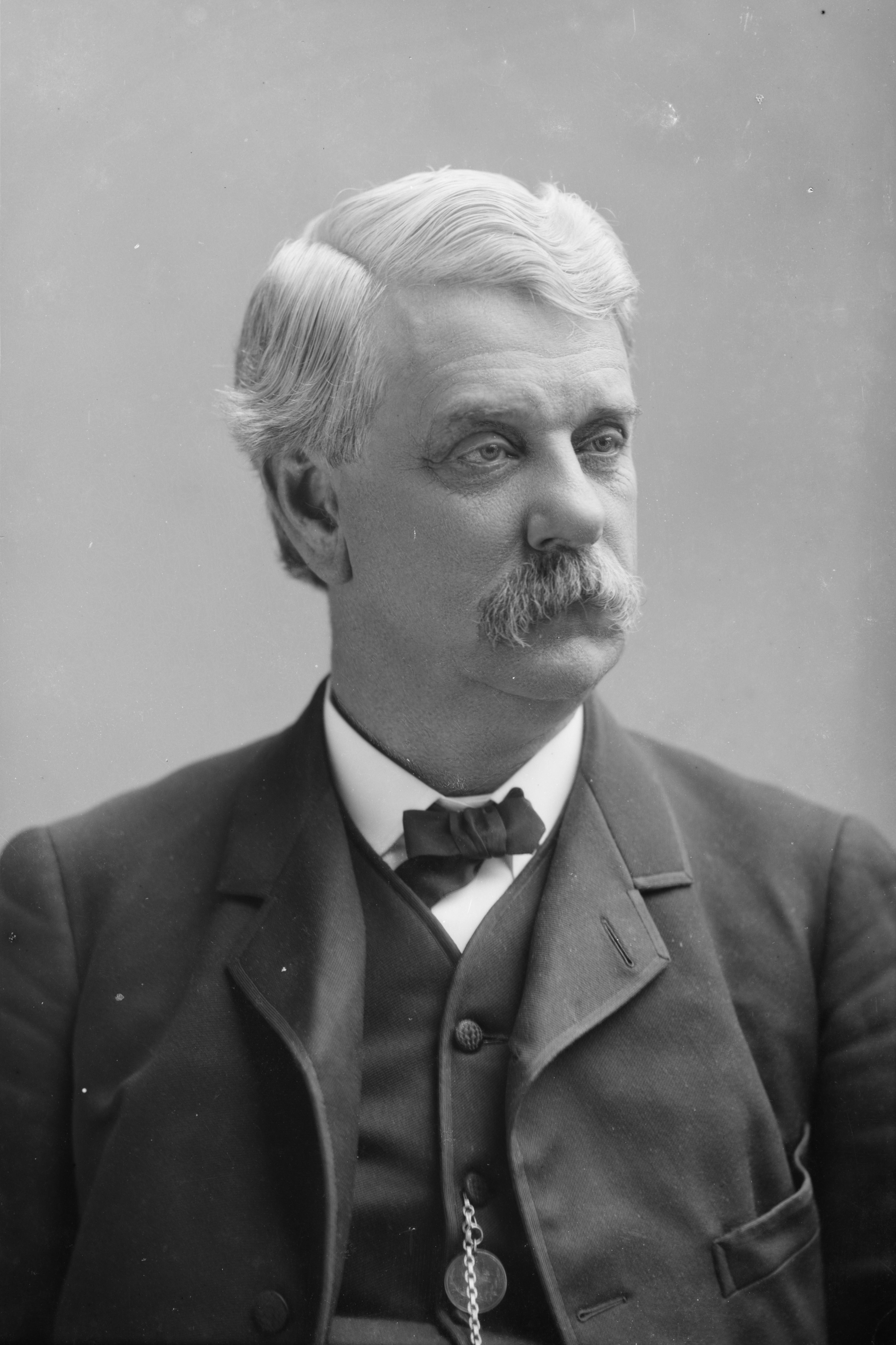

5th President of the Board of Commissioners of Washington, D.C.
- In office January 1, 1886 – May 21, 1889
- President: Grover Cleveland; Benjamin Harrison
- Preceded by: James Barker Edmonds
- Succeeded by: John Watkinson Douglass

Member of the Board of Commissioners of Washington, D.C.
- In office July 22, 1885 – May 21, 1889
- President: Grover Cleveland; Benjamin Harrison
- Preceded by: Joseph Rodman West
- Succeeded by: John Watkinson Douglass

Personal details
- Born: September 17, 1825 City of Washington, D.C., U.S.
- Died: March 13, 1896 (aged 70) Washington, D.C., U.S.
- Resting place: Oak Hill Cemetery; Georgetown, Washington, D.C.
- Party: Republican
- Education: Columbia College
- Profession: Attorney, Politician

William Benning Webb (September 17, 1825 – March 13, 1896) was an American politician and attorney who was the Police Superintendent of Washington, D.C., and president of the board of commissioners for the District of Columbia, U.S., from 1886 to 1889. He was the first President of the Board of Commissioners to be born in Washington.

== Biography ==
Webb was born in the City of Washington, DC on September 17, 1825. He was only 19 years old when he graduated from Columbia College (now George Washington University), and was admitted to the District of Columbia bar Three years later. Upon admission he entered practice, in which he remained until 1861. That year, the capital's Metropolitan Police Department was organized, and Webb was appointed its first superintendent by Mayor Richard Wallach. Webb served in this capacity until 1863 when he resigned from the Police Department and returned to his Washington law practice. He commanded an extremely high reputation among his colleagues. The Washington Post said of Webb that "his digest of municipal laws, as affecting the national capital, is regarded as the standard authority."

In 1885, upon the vacancy of Joseph Rodman West from his seat on the D.C. Board of Commissioners, President Grover Cleveland surprised the city establishment by offering the appointment to the popular and respected Webb, who accepted and joined the commission for its sixth session in July 1885. When board president James Barker Edmonds declined reappointment on April 1, 1886, Cleveland raised Webb to the position.

Webb died at his home in Washington on March 13, 1896, at the age of 70. He was buried at Oak Hill Cemetery.

In 1901, The William Benning Webb School, named in his honor, opened at 15th and Rosedale, NE. It was an all-white school, but by 1947 it had become unused and at late that year became an annex to all-black Browne Junior High School. It was shut down sometime shortly thereafter and was used for school storage for years. In 2024, the building was refurbished to become the Early Education Center for Miner Elementary School serving pre-kindergarten students.

Political offices
Preceded by James Barker Edmonds	President of the D.C. Board of Commissioners; 1886 — 1889	Succeeded by John Watkinson Douglass
