= J. R. West =

American politician

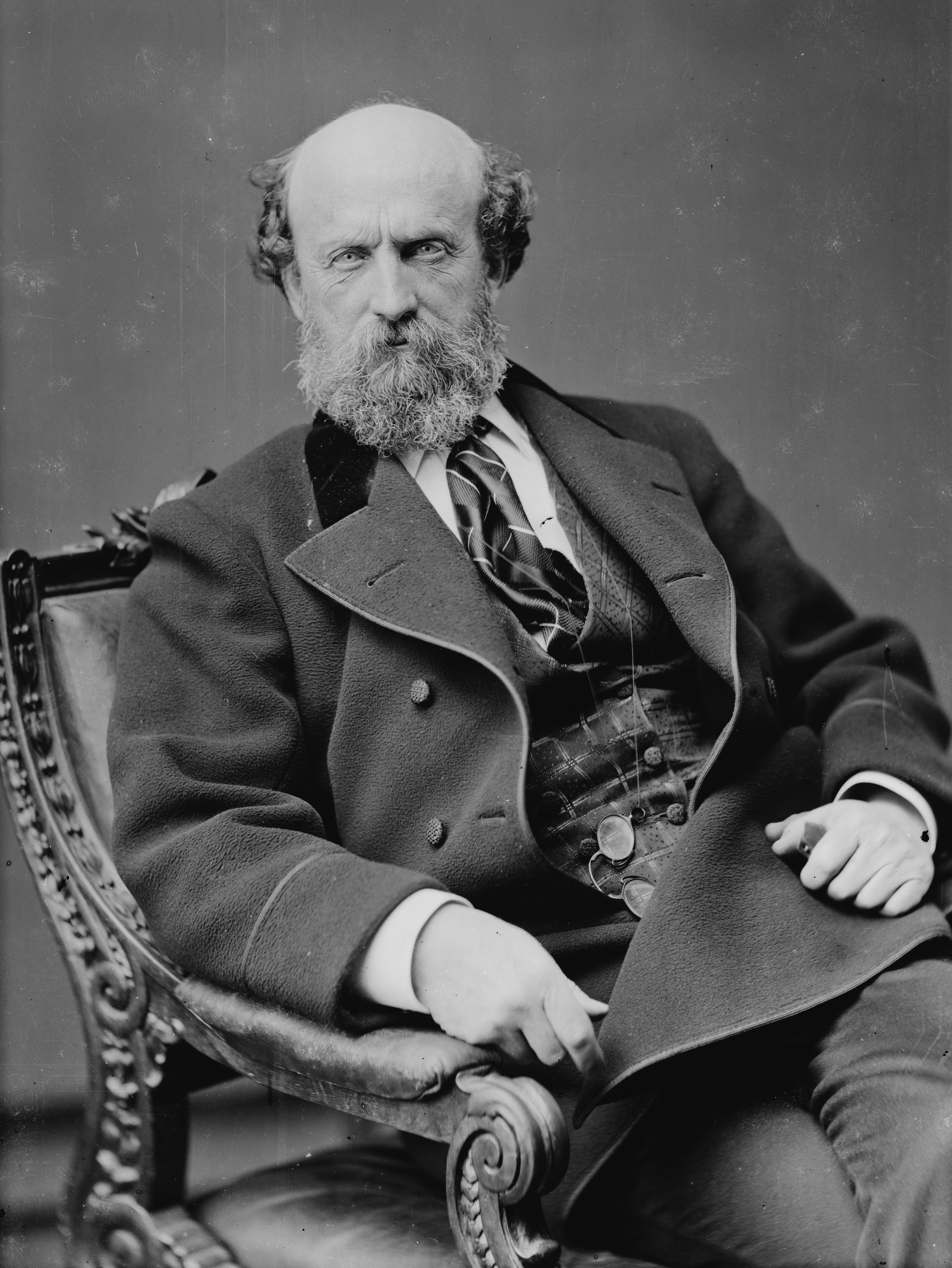

United States Senator from Louisiana
- In office March 4, 1871 – March 3, 1877
- Preceded by: John S. Harris
- Succeeded by: William P. Kellogg

3rd President of the Board of Commissioners of Washington, D.C.
- In office July 17, 1882 – March 29, 1883
- Preceded by: Josiah Dent
- Succeeded by: James Barker Edmonds

Member of the Board of Commissioners of Washington, D.C.
- In office July 17, 1882 – July 22, 1885
- President: Chester A. Arthur; Grover Cleveland
- Preceded by: Josiah Dent
- Succeeded by: William Benning Webb

Personal details
- Born: Joseph Rodman West; September 19, 1822 New Orleans, Louisiana, U.S.
- Died: October 31, 1898 (aged 76) Washington, D.C., U.S.
- Resting place: Arlington National Cemetery
- Party: Republican
- Spouse: Jeanne J. West
- Education: University of Pennsylvania

Military service
- Branch/service: United States Army; Union Army
- Years of service: 1847–1848, 1861–1866
- Rank: Brigadier General; Brevet Major General
- Battles/wars: Mexican–American War; American Civil War

Joseph Rodman West (September 19, 1822 – October 31, 1898), also known as J. Rodman West, was a United States senator from Louisiana, a Union general in the United States Army during and after the American Civil War and the chief executive of the District of Columbia. As a commander of militia, he gave the order to torture and murder Apache chief Mangas Coloradas, who had come to meet with him under a flag of truce to discuss terms of peace.

== Biography ==
Born in New Orleans, he moved with his parents to Philadelphia in 1824 and was educated in private schools. He attended the University of Pennsylvania from 1836 to 1837 and moved to New Orleans in 1841; he was a captain attached to Maryland and District of Columbia Volunteers in the Mexican–American War, 1847–1848. He moved to California in 1849, where he engaged in newspaper work in San Francisco, and was proprietor of the San Francisco Price Current.

During the Civil War he entered the Union Army as lieutenant of the First Regiment, California Volunteer Infantry, in 1861; he was promoted to the rank of colonel and brigadier general. He spent much of his service in the New Mexico Territory as well as Arizona Territory.

In January 1863, Mangas Coloradas decided to personally meet with U.S. military leaders at Fort McLane, near present-day Hurley in southwestern New Mexico. Mangas arrived under a white flag of truce to meet with Brigadier General West. Armed soldiers took him into custody, and West is reported to have given an execution order to the sentries. That night Mangas was tortured with heated bayonets, then shot and killed as he was "trying to escape."

In April 1864, West was ordered to Arkansas to take command of the 2nd Division, VII Corps. He led it through the Red River Campaign. In the fall of 1864, under Major General Frederick Steele, he was engaged against Confederate Major General Sterling Price. He next commanded the cavalry in the Department of the Gulf, from May 15 to June 12, 1865.

He commanded the 1st Division of Cavalry in the Military Division of the Southwest, composed of two small brigades (six regiments) of volunteer cavalry exempted from mustering out. Accompanied by cavalry commander Maj-Gen Wesley Merritt, he led the division from Shreveport, Louisiana, to San Antonio, Texas, in July 1865 for Reconstruction duty and as a counter to Imperial Mexican forces along the Rio Grande. West was mustered out of volunteer service as a brevetted major general in San Antonio on January 4, 1866.

Following the Civil War, West returned to New Orleans and was deputy United States marshal and auditor for customs from 1867 to 1871. West was elected as a Republican to the U.S. Senate and served from March 4, 1871, to March 3, 1877; he was not a candidate for reelection. While in the Senate he was chairman of the Committee on Railroads (Forty-fourth Congress). He was a member of the board of commissioners of the District of Columbia from 1882 to 1885, serving as president of the board – the equivalent of mayor – from 1882 to 1883. He retired from public life in 1885 and died in Washington, D.C., in 1898; interment was in Arlington National Cemetery.

West Education Campus in Washington, D.C., was previously named in his honor. In 2021, the school was renamed John Lewis Elementary School, in honor of the late civil rights leader and longtime member of the U. S. House of Representatives. In a letter proposing to remove West's name from the school, Mayor Muriel Bowser wrote, "As a commander, he gave the order to torture and murder Apache chief Mangas Coloradas, who had come to meet with him to discuss terms of peace."

== See also ==
- List of American Civil War generals (Union)

U.S. Senate
Preceded by John S. Harris	U.S. senator (Class 2) from Louisiana; 1871–1877; Served alongside: William P. Kellogg, James B. Eustis	Succeeded by William P. Kellogg
Political offices
Preceded by Josiah Dent	President of the Board of Commissioners of Washington, D.C. 1882–1883	Succeeded by James Barker Edmonds
