= Johnny St. Valentine Brown =

American police detective

- Born: 1943 (age 82–83)
- Other name: "Jehru"
- Police career
- Country: United States of America
- Allegiance: District of Columbia
- Department: Metropolitan Police Department of the District of Columbia
- Service years: 1970–1999
- Rank: Detective

Johnny St. Valentine Brown (also known by the nickname Jehru) was a police detective for the Metropolitan Police Department in Washington, D.C., who served as a chief investigator for a U.S. House committee studying drug trafficking and worked for the Office of National Drug Control Policy. He also served as an advisor to Eric Sterling, counsel to the House committee responsible for the drafting of anti-drug laws.

== Career ==
As chief investigator and Sterling's advisor, he was instrumental in setting the "100-to-1 crack-to-powder" ratio and other weight-based triggers for sentencing guidelines in the "Len Bias Law" that set much stricter sentencing guidelines for drug offenders. This law was passed in the shocking death of NBA draft pick and college star Len Bias from a cocaine-induced heart attack two days after being drafted by the Boston Celtics. Critics of this law, eventually including Eric Sterling, would go on to say that the weights that Brown suggested ended up targeting low-level offenders instead of mid- to high-level traffickers, as was the original intention of the bill. Critics contend that Brown's "expertise" ended up worsening prison overcrowding and wasting enforcement efforts with low-level offenders.

During the course of his deposition in Butera v. District of Columbia, a case related to the infamous D.C. Starbucks murders, Brown testified under oath as the District's expert witness that he'd earned a doctorate in pharmacology from Howard University in 1972. After the deposition, attorney Saul Jay Singer checked the alleged credentials of the opposing expert. Howard University confirmed to Singer that not only had Brown not obtained any advanced degree from Howard but that, in fact, he had never even attended the university. Singer's instincts that something was off about Brown had been heightened when Brown fell hard for Singer's trap. Consistent with his regular practice in preparing questions for the deposition of an opposing expert witness, Singer fed co-counsel Peter Grenier a nonsensical question to ask Brown: "Have you ever heard of the 'Marijuana Reagent Test?'" In fact, there was no such test, yet Brown testified under oath that not only was he intimately familiar with it, but he had, in fact, personally administered the Marijuana Reagent Test to suspects hundreds of times. In 2000, Brown pleaded guilty to perjury charges for lying about earning an advanced degree from Howard University's School of Pharmacy.

During his sentencing, Brown submitted several letters to the sentencing judge, Henry H. Kennedy Jr., in a bid for a more lenient sentence. Letters submitted were from Walter E. Fauntroy (a former D.C. delegate to Congress), Robert Werner (spokesperson for the Office of National Drug Control Policy), William Lucy (a leader of the American Federation of State, County and Municipal Employees), and Johnette Wilson (coordinator of Washington Hospital's youth mentoring program).

After giving Brown a favorable sentence of one year, Kennedy contacted each of the letter-writers to thank them for interest in Brown's case. However, it was learned that Brown had counterfeited each of the letters and the supposed writers were "stunned" to learn of the forgeries. Brown was then charged with contempt of court, for which he received an additional one year in prison, and ordered to stand trial for the forgeries.

Brown's conviction triggered the retrial of many convicted drug offenders in the D.C. area.
