= Josiah Dent =

American politician (1817–1899)

2nd President of the Board of Commissioners of Washington, D.C.
- In office November 29, 1879 – July 17, 1882
- President: Rutherford B. Hayes; James A. Garfield; Chester A. Arthur
- Preceded by: Seth Ledyard Phelps
- Succeeded by: Joseph R. West

District of Columbia Commissioner
- In office July 1, 1878 – July 17, 1882
- President: Rutherford B. Hayes; James A. Garfield; Chester A. Arthur
- Preceded by: position created
- Succeeded by: Joseph R. West

Personal details
- Born: August 26, 1817 Charles County, Maryland, U.S.
- Died: October 28, 1899 (aged 82) Berkeley Springs, West Virginia, U.S.
- Resting place: Oak Hill Cemetery; Georgetown, Washington, D.C.
- Party: Democratic
- Profession: Attorney, Politician

Josiah Dent (August 26, 1817 – October 28th, 1899) was the third president of the Board of Commissioners of the District of Columbia, serving from 1879 to 1882.

== Early life ==
Dent was born in Charles County, Maryland, in 1817. His father was an Episcopal priest who served in a Maryland regiment during the Revolutionary War. Dent attended school at Charlotte Hall. He became an attorney in the 1840s and set up a practice in St. Louis, Missouri. In the following decade, a cholera epidemic broke out in St. Louis, and Dent became a prominent relief worker and organizer. He remained in St. Louis until 1861, when the Civil War began, at which time he moved to Washington, D.C. Dent never argued law in the D.C. courts, but had a thriving wartime practice as the custodian of absentee properties: because his strong sympathies for the Democratic Party were well known, Washington and District residents who joined the Confederacy would leave their property in his care to maintain and protect them from government confiscation.

After the Civil War, Dent became the president of the board of directors of Linthicum Institute, an educational institution founded by a bequest of $50,000 in the will of Dent's father-in-law Edward M. Linthicum (a prominent socialite and philanthropist in Georgetown). The institute was an alternative educational institution for young men who could not otherwise afford college. Over its existence, it hosted hundreds of male students, making Dent's reputation as a deeply committed educator.

== District leadership ==
Dent was, in 1874, a member of the Congressionally mandated committee that recommended the disposal of the territorial government and the formulation of a three-member board of commissioners (one Democrat, one Republican, and one non-affiliated planning engineer) for the District of Columbia. In July 1878, President Rutherford B. Hayes appointed Dent as the Democratic commissioner on that board.

Dent became president of the board in the following year after the resignation of Seth Ledyard Phelps serving until July 1882. During his term as board president, Dent was noted for improving the relations between the capital city and the U.S. Treasury.

== Later life, death and honors ==
After his term as commissioner expired, Dent lived in Georgetown until 1889, when he married his second wife and moved to Berkeley Springs, West Virginia where he died in 1899. He was buried in Washington's Oak Hill Cemetery.

In 1900, the Josiah Dent School, named his honor, was built at 2nd and South Carolina SE. It was operated from the time it opened in 1901 until 1947 when it was closed due to declining enrollment. It then served as the DC Department of Education's repair shop until 1978. Faced with abandonment, the Capital Hill Day School, which had until then been housed in the Sunday school classrooms of the Lutheran Church of the Reformation on East Capitol Street and Christ Church on G Street, leased the property and is currently housed in the facility.

Political offices
Preceded by Seth Ledyard Phelps	President of the D.C. Board of Commissioners; 1879 — 1882	Succeeded by Joseph Rodman West
