= Metropolitan Police Department of the District of Columbia =

Law enforcement agency of Washington, D.C., U.S.

- Patch of the Metropolitan Police Department of the District of Columbia

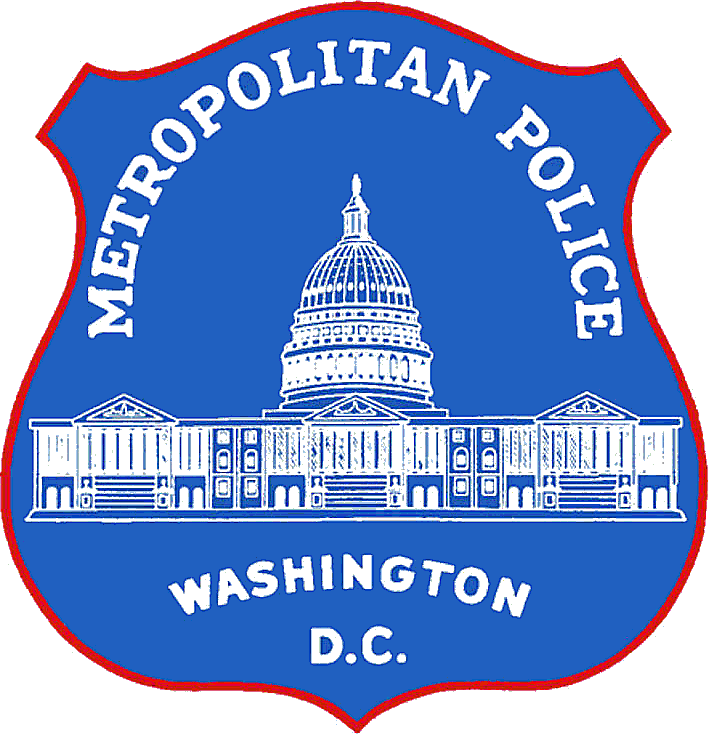
- Seal of the Metropolitan Police Department of the District of Columbia

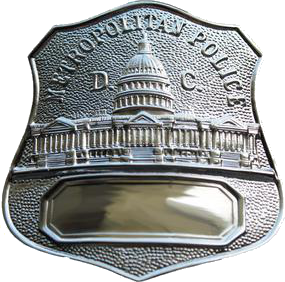
- Badge of the Metropolitan Police Department

- Flag of the Metropolitan Police Department of the District of Columbia
- Common name: Metropolitan Police Department
- Abbreviation: MPD or MPDC
- Motto: Policing with Purpose, Serving with Care.

Agency overview
- Formed: August 6, 1861; 165 years ago
- Preceding agencies: Washington City police (daytime); Auxiliary Guard (nighttime)
- Employees: 4,100 (June 2022)
- Annual budget: $544 million (2021)

Jurisdictional structure
- Operations jurisdiction: United States
- Map of Metropolitan Police Department of the District of Columbia's jurisdiction
- Population: 671,803 (2022)
- Legal jurisdiction: District of Columbia
- General nature: Local civilian police

Operational structure
- Headquarters: Henry J. Daly Building; 300 Indiana Avenue NW
- Sworn police officers: >3,300 officers
- Professional staffs: >700 civilian personnel
- Command Staffs responsible: Jeffery Carroll, Interim Chief of Police; Carl Amritt, Chief of Staff; Andre Wright, Executive Assistant Chief, Patrol Operations; Jeffrey Kopp, Assistant Chief—Patrol Services North; LaShay Makal, Assistant Chief—Patrol Services South
- Agency executives: Leeann Turner, Chief Administrative Officer; Ramey Kyle, Assistant Chief—Investigative Services Bureau; Carlos Heraud, Assistant Chief—Homeland Security Bureau; Tasha Bryant, Assistant Chief—Internal Affairs Bureau; Darnel Robinson, Assistant Chief—Technical and Analytical Services Bureau; Angela Simpson, Chief People Officer—Organizational Culture & Wellness Bureau
- Divisions: 18: -Special Operations; -Youth and Family Services; -Criminal Investigations; -Violent Crime Suppression; -Youth and Family Engagement; -District Investigations; -Real Time Crime Center; -Internal Affairs; -Risk Management; -Court Liaison; -Recruiting; -Metropolitan Police Academy; -Disciplinary Review; -Technology; -Records; -Fleet Services; -Evidence Control; -Human Resource Management; -Medical Services
- Bureaus: 8: -Patrol Services North; -Patrol Services South; -Homeland Security; -Professional Development; -Investigative Services; -Internal Affairs; -Technical Services; -Organizational Culture & Wellness

Facilities
- Districts: 7: First District; Second District; Third District; Fourth District; Fifth District; Sixth District; Seventh District
- Police boats: 2
- Helicopters: 2
- Dogs: 1 Bloodhound; 31 German Shepherds

Website
- mpdc.dc.gov

The Metropolitan Police Department of the District of Columbia, more commonly known locally as the Metropolitan Police Department (MPD), and, colloquially, DC Police, is the primary law enforcement agency for the District of Columbia, in the United States. With approximately 3,200 officers and 600 civilian staff, it is the sixth-largest municipal police department in the United States. The department serves an area of 68 square miles (180 km^{2}) and a population of over 700,000 people. Established on August 6, 1861, the MPD is one of the oldest police departments in the United States. The MPD headquarters was formerly located at the Henry J. Daly Building, located at 300 Indiana Avenue NW in Judiciary Square across the street from the District of Columbia Court of Appeals and the Superior Court of the District of Columbia. However, in 2023, MPD moved into One Judiciary Square located at 441 4th St NW when the Daly Building started extensive renovation and refurbishment. The department's mission is to "safeguard the District of Columbia and protect its residents and visitors with the highest regard for the sanctity of human life". The MPD's regulations are compiled in title 5, chapter 1 of the District of Columbia Code.

The MPD has a broad array of specialized services, including the Emergency Response Team, K9, harbor patrol, air support, explosive ordnance division, homeland security, criminal intelligence, narcotics, and the violent crime suppression units. The MPD also operates the Command Information Center (CIC) which monitors hundreds of cameras across the city, license plate readers, ShotSpotter, and many other intelligence and surveillance devices.

The MPD has a unique role in that it serves as a local police department, with county, state and federal responsibilities, and is under a municipal government but operates under federal authority. They are responsible for operating the district's sex offender registry, approving all applications for motorcades, protests, demonstrations and other public events, and maintaining the district's firearm registry.

== Duties ==
While the MPD is the primary law enforcement agency in the city, it shares its jurisdiction with the Transit Police, responsible for policing the Washington Metropolitan Area Transit Authority Metrorail and Metrobus systems; the United States Park Police, which provides law enforcement for the National Mall and all other National Park Service properties; the United States Marshals Service, which acts as the city's sheriff; and many other federal agencies. However, the MPD ultimately remains the primary agency in the city and has the authority to investigate all crimes in the city regardless of the location it took place.

Under the District of Columbia Home Rule Act, whenever the President of the United States determines that special conditions of an emergency nature exist which require the use of the Metropolitan Police for federal purposes, the president may direct the mayor to provide, and the mayor shall provide, such services of the Metropolitan Police force for up to 48 hours. During longer periods of time, the president must provide to Congress in writing his or her reasons for continuing control of the MPD. This control can be extended at any time beyond 30 days if either the emergency continues or if Congress passes a law ordering it. During this nature of emergency, the MPD is considered a federal law enforcement agency.

== History ==
=== 19th century ===
As the American Civil War raged on, U.S. president Abraham Lincoln took a personal interest in the formation of a regular police force for the U.S. capital. Washington had quickly filled with soldiers, government employees, and citizens hoping to cash in on the war. The crowds, crime, and the constant threat of enemy spies, had made the capital into a rowdy city barely under control. After the formation of the Metropolitan Police and its governing Board of Commissioners by Act of Congress, signed into law by Lincoln on August 6, 1861, Lincoln dispatched a member of the board to study the New York City Police Department and its structure.

The Metropolitan Police replaced previous law enforcement organizations. Before the formation of the district in 1801, county constables had jurisdiction over the area, along with the comparatively developed police force for the City of Alexandria. Within the City of Washington, the first police superintendent was named in 1803, and the city divided into four policing wards, each under a constable, in 1804. Yet another force, the 16-member Auxiliary Guard of the City of Washington, was established by Act of Congress in August 1842, purportedly because President John Tyler had been burned in effigy, and had rocks thrown at him on the White House grounds. The formation of the Metropolitan Police dissolved all these previous authorities. (The Militia of the District of Columbia was created in the Assumption Act of May 3, 1802, active as peacekeepers within the district but tasked with defending the federal government, and commanded directly by the president as a military force, not law enforcement.)

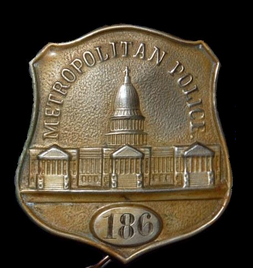
One of the earliest MPD badges. Today's badge has changed little from the original.

The Metropolitan Police Board unanimously chose one of its members, William Benning Webb, who was commissioned as a major in the army, to serve as the first chief of police, the formal title being "Major and Superintendent". The Police Board initially divided the district into 10 precincts. The First Precinct constituted the portion of Washington County east of the Anacostia River, while the Second Precinct included the county territory north of Washington City and between the Anacostia and Rock Creek. The Third Precinct comprised the remainder of Washington County west of Rock Creek, including Georgetown and the island of Analostan in the Potomac River. The Fourth through Tenth precincts corresponded respectively with the First through Seventh wards of Washington City. Beginning immediately, Superintendent Webb worked to organize the department which had an authorized strength of ten sergeants and as many patrolmen as needed, though not to exceed 150. The majority of the new department was hired by September, with the superintendent of police salaried annually at $1,500, sergeants received $600, and patrolmen were paid $480. The officers worked 12-hour shifts, seven days a week with no holidays or vacation time. At first officers were issued no uniform or badges and had to purchase their own firearms. The U.S. Capitol building was chosen as the back drop of the MPD badge a month later and today's badge has changed little from the original. The first arrest by an MPD officer was for public intoxication.

At the urging of U.S. Marshal for the District of Columbia Ward Lamon and United States Secretary of War Edwin M. Stanton, President Lincoln agreed in November 1864 to have bodyguards, although he felt that the president of the United States should not have found it necessary to have guards at all. Superintendent Webb had four MPD officers assigned the task of guarding the White House grounds and accompanying the president on his walks through the city. However, Lincoln did not want this fact made public, and the officer's orders were not made official, and they wore plainclothes with their revolvers concealed. One of the officers, William H. Crook, the most well known of Lincoln's original guards, would go on to serve under five other administrations and wrote down his recollections in a book, Through Five Administrations. He became close to Lincoln and accompanied him to Richmond, Virginia, at Lincoln's request after the city was captured. Two officers would begin their shift at 8 a.m. until 4 p.m. They were then relieved by an officer who stay until midnight and was then himself relieved at 8 the next morning.

In December 1864, A. C. Richards became Major and Superintendent, a post he would hold through the next 14 years. Richards was present at Ford's Theater the night the Lincoln was assassinated by John Wilkes Booth. In one of the lowest points of the MPD's history, the police officer who was to guard Lincoln that night, John Frederick Parker, had left his post at the door to Lincoln's box, presumably to get a drink at the bar across the street. Officer Crook, who had been on duty that day and had been relieved by Parker who was several hours late for his shift, would place blame in his book on Parker for Lincoln's death.

After Booth had fled the theater, Major Richards began organizing the activities for investigation until it was taken over by Secretary Stanton. In the hours immediately after the assassination, MPD officers enforced closures of all places of entertainment and helped seal off the city. They patrolled the streets on horses alongside members of the Military Provost. That night on April 14, 1865, an MPD detective entered into the daily blotter: At this hour the melancholy intelligence of the assassination of Mr. Lincoln President of the U.S. at Fords Theatre was brought to this office and the information obtained ... goes to show that the assassin is a man named J. Wilks Boothe. It remains the most famous entry in the MPD's records. A tip provided to MPD detectives indicated that the Mary E. Surratt Boarding House at 614 H Street was linked to the assassination. The tip would lead to the eventual trial and execution of Booth's conspirators.

In 1871, the first MPD officer was killed in the line of duty. On Friday, December 29, 1871, Officer Francis M. Doyle and several other officers attempted to gain entry to the house of a thief to recover stolen property. When they forced the door, the wife of the suspected thief fired at them, striking Doyle in the chest and killing him instantly. Although the wife was arrested and tried for the murder, she was acquitted. Officer Doyle was a veteran of the Civil War, having served in the US Navy, and had been with the MPD for five years. He was 38 years old at the time of his death and was survived by his wife and three children. He was buried in the Congressional Cemetery.

The MPD is the only police department that has arrested a sitting U.S. president. During his presidency, Ulysses S. Grant was known to speed in his horse and buggy on Washington's streets. The MPD had issued him three different citations for this offense. On the fourth occasion, Grant was arrested on M Street for racing, and his horse and buggy were confiscated. When brought to the station however, the officers became unsure if a sitting president could be formally charged if he had not been impeached. Grant was allowed to pay a fine but had to walk back to the White House. In 1878, Congress abolished the Metropolitan Police Board, and its duties were taken over by the newly formed DC Board of Commissioners, established by Congress to govern the entire district. That year as well, Thomas P. Morgan was named to replace Richards, who had resigned, as Major and Superintendent. Although a police fund had been established during the MPD's first year to assist those officers injured in the line of duty, Morgan would add to this by establishing a retirement fund for older officers who could no longer perform their duties.

On July 2, 1881, the MPD took part in investigating the assassination of President James A. Garfield. The assassin, Charles J. Guiteau, approached Garfield at the Baltimore and Potomac Railroad Station and fired his weapon twice, hitting Garfield. Although Garfield had no bodyguards, MPD Officer Patrick Kearney had been nearby and arrested Guiteau before he could leave the station. Kearney took Guiteau a few blocks away to the station to be booked where the small pistol that Guiteau had used was discovered inside his jacket pocket. The officials at the station at first refused to believe Kearney's claims that Guiteau had shot the president. The detective blotter would note the shooting, investigation, and arrest as well as Garfield's death several weeks later.

=== 20th century ===
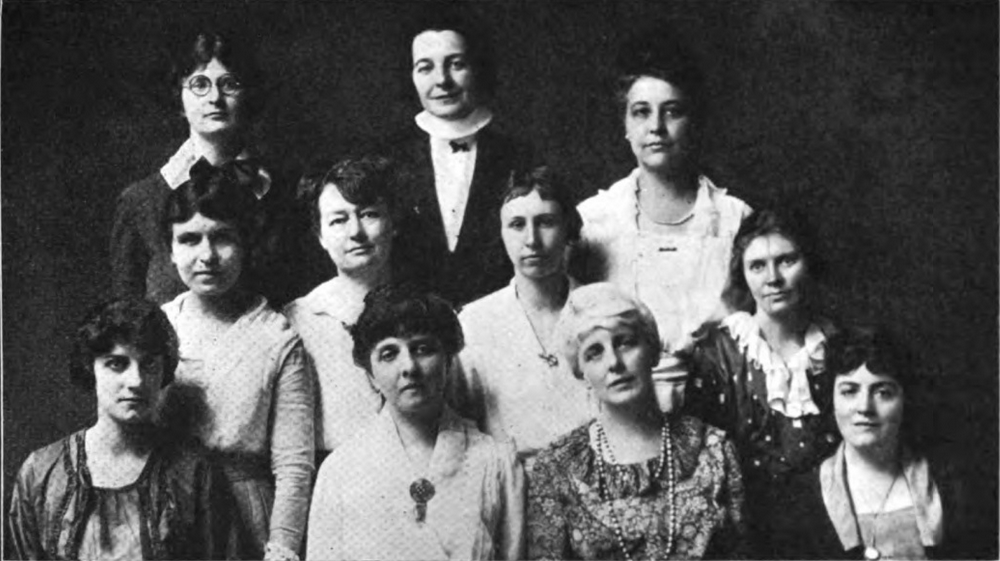
Woman's Bureau (1919)

In the summer of 1918, Major and Superintendent Raymond W. Pulliam established the Women's Bureau, originally directed by Marion O. Spingarn. The Women's Bureau was created to deal with issues involving juveniles, specifically girls, such as delinquency, investigating casework on juveniles, preventive welfare work to curb criminality in juveniles, and the supervision of movie theatres, dance halls, and similar places. Most of the officers in the Bureau in 1920 were trained as school teachers, nurses, or social workers, and included one lawyer. On October 7, 1918, Mina Van Winkle was appointed a police officer in the Women's Bureau. She was known to be extremely outspoken and was an ardent supporter of protection for girls and other women during the law enforcement and judicial process. In January 1919 Van Winkle became director of the Women's Bureau, a post she held until her death in 1932.

Also in 1919, the MPD established a "School of Instruction" on the third floor of the 7th Precinct. This was the early forerunner to the Training Bureau and today's Metropolitan Police Academy. A group of 22 officers took a 30-day course in the fundamental duties of police officers, the law of arrest, and court procedures. By 1930, an official training school was established. The school expanded the original course work to a three-month period, and brought in outside experts from various fields to instruct.

During Prohibition, the MPD remained active dealing with the organized crime that resulted in DC. During that thirteen-year period, almost 25 officers were killed in the line of duty, mostly due to gunfire and accidents while pursuing rum-runners.

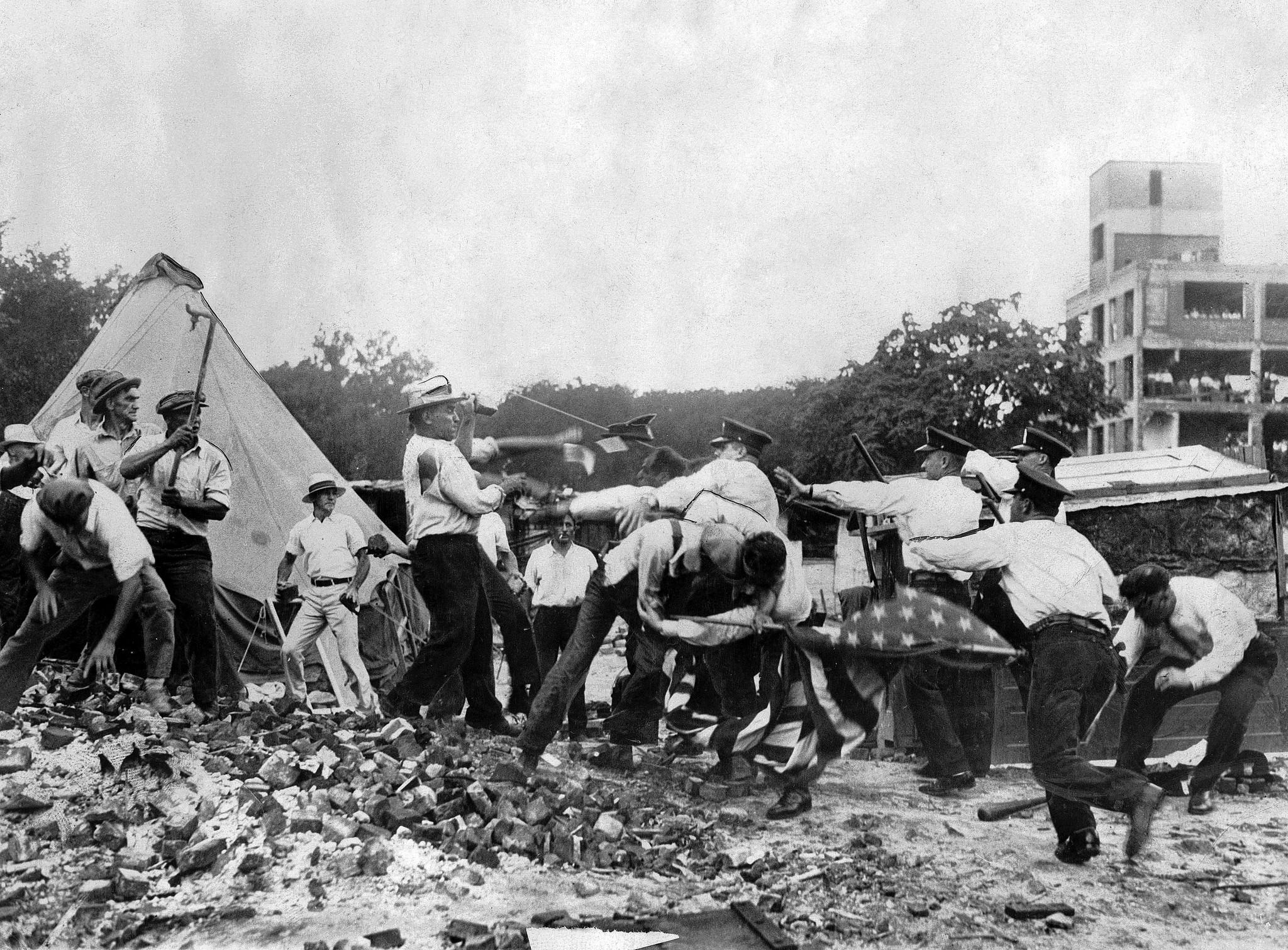
MPD officers confront the Bonus Army

During the Great Depression, over 17,000 veterans of the First World War marched on Washington to demand payment for their service. Known as the Bonus Army, they set up camp in a Hooverville in Anacostia Park. The marchers remained at their campsite waiting for President Herbert Hoover to take action after Congress rejected a bill to pay the veterans. On July 28, 1932, Attorney General William D. Mitchell ordered the Metropolitan Police to remove the Bonus Army veterans from their camp. When the veterans moved back into it, they rushed two officers trapped on the second floor of a structure. The cornered officers drew their revolvers and shot two veterans, William Hushka and Eric Carlson, who died later. In the aftermath of the shooting, President Hoover ordered the military, under General Douglas MacArthur, to disperse the Bonus Army. Fifty-five veterans were injured and 135 arrested.

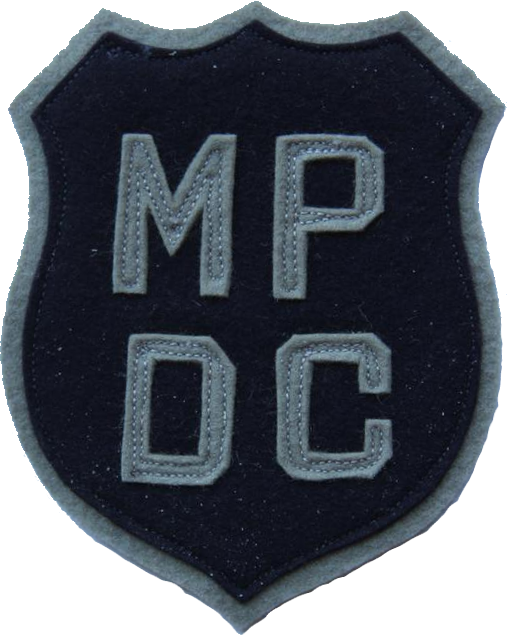
MPD patch from the 1940s

In December 1951, Robert V. Murray became Major and Superintendent. He took the command of a demoralized department marred by embarrassments, corruption, and waning public support. During his 13 years as chief, Murray would be credited with making the most sweeping, and longest lasting changes in the MPD's history and is seen as bringing the department into the modern era of policing. One of his first acts was that he would make rounds of the various precincts, inspecting them and the officers where he promised his support. He developed a code of ethics for officers and created a new branch to investigate police corruption, named the Internal Investigations Division—this was a precursor to the Internal Affairs Division. Murray also made good on his promise to improve conditions for his department. By 1952 Murray had petitioned Congress to give his officers a ten percent raise, had turned the six-day work week into a five-day work week, and worked to have two officers per patrol car. He went on to improve the MPD's vehicle fleet, initiated the use of canines, radar, helicopters and experimented with hand held radios.

In 1953 Congress passed the District Government Reorganization Act. It formally abolished the rank and title of Major and Superintendent and replaced it with the position of Chief of Police. Murray would be the last Major and Superintendent and the first Chief of Police of the MPD. Murray's reforms and efforts improved the image of the department which expanded to 3,000 officers. He and the MPD earned public accolades for their handling of the Transit strikes in the hot summers of 1955 and 1956, the March on Washington, and the funeral of JFK. One of his final major acts would be to fully integrate assignments. Specific assignments and beats would no longer be given by only white officers or only black officers. Although it did not eliminate racist tensions and discrimination, it moved the department forward towards racial equality.

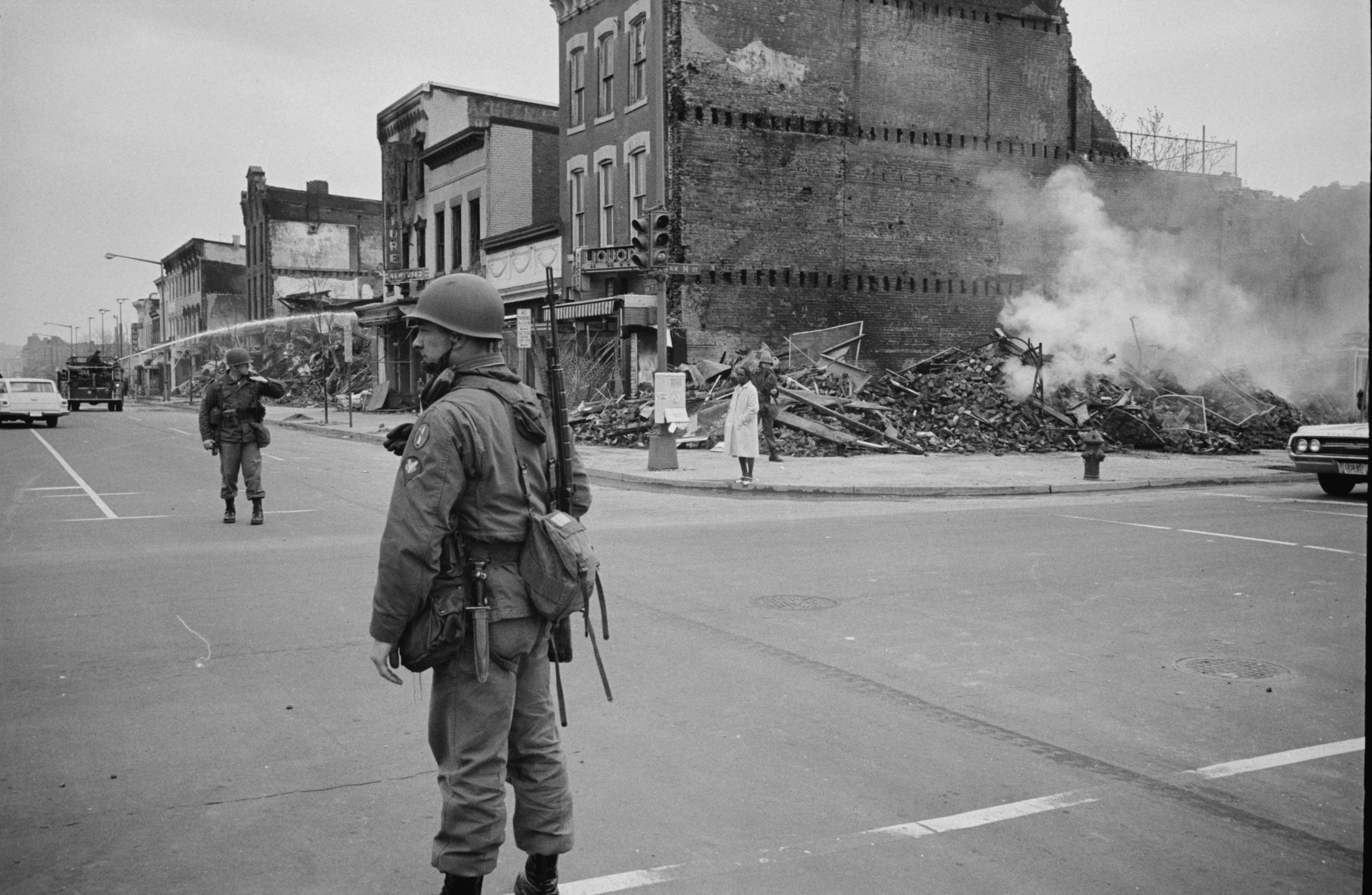
Aftermath from the 1968 riots

The April 1968 Washington, D.C., riots, in the aftermath of the assassination of Martin Luther King Jr., were the most devastating to the city. The roughly 20,000 rioters quickly overwhelmed the 3,100 member police department. During the four days of violence, the inner part of Washington was devastated in widespread looting and fires, at one point coming within two blocks of the White House. The rioting ended when 11,850 federal troops and 1,750 D.C. Army National Guardsmen were called out to assist the overwhelmed MPD. 13 people were killed, 1,098 were injured, and over 6,100 were arrested. The resulting economic fallout and crime spike would take many areas decades to recover from. The mobilization of 13,600 troops to assist the MPD in putting down the riot was the largest military occupation of an American city since the Civil War.

On September 20, 1974, Officer Gail A. Cobb was shot and killed, becoming the first female U.S. police officer to be shot and killed while patrolling in the line of duty. While on foot patrol, Cobb was tipped off that a suspected bank robber had just fled into a nearby garage. She located the man and instructed him to place his hands on the wall. As she radioed for assistance, the suspect spun around and fired a single shot at point-blank range. The bullet went through her wrist and her police radio and then struck in the chest, killing her.

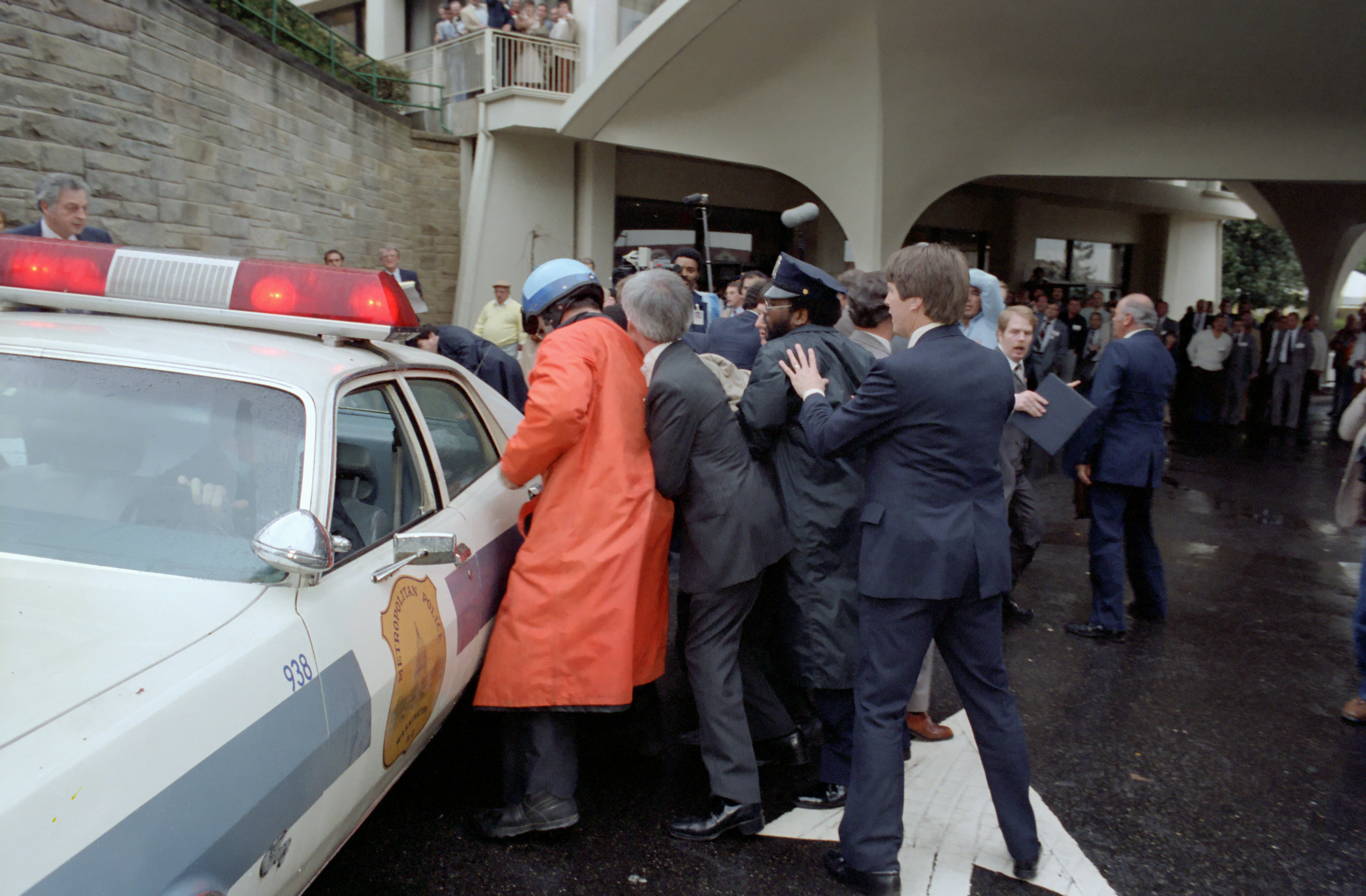
MPD Officers and Secret Service Agents crowd around John Hinckley Jr. next to an MPD patrol car after he shot President Reagan

Officers of the MPD were also present at the assassination attempt of President Ronald Reagan during which one officer, Thomas Delahanty, was shot. In the late 1980s and early 1990s Washington was hit by the crack epidemic and the homicide rates soared. The district soon became known as the "murder capital" of the nation.

During the 1991 Washington, D.C. riot, the MPD contended with three days of violence by rioters, mostly in the Mt. Pleasant neighborhood, who were upset in the aftermath of a controversial police shooting which exacerbated strained relationships between the city's Hispanic population and the MPD. The riot was dispersed after a curfew was initiated and over 1,000 riot police descended on the area to enforce the peace.

In 1999, recently appointed Chief of Police Charles H. Ramsey partnered with the Washington DC Regional Office of the Anti-Defamation League and the United States Holocaust Memorial Museum to create a new training program that used the lessons of the Holocaust to help officers better understand their roles in upholding the Constitution and protecting individual rights. Since then, more than 140,000 federal, state and local law enforcement officers have gone through the "Law Enforcement and Society" training.

In 2000, MPD detective Johnny St. Valentine Brown, assigned to the narcotics division, was convicted of perjury after lying about having a degree from Howard University's School of Pharmacy. In the wake of his conviction, many drug offenders with cases involving Brown were retried. In 2001, Brown was charged with contempt after sending the sentencing judge forged letters of support in a bid to gain leniency in his sentencing.

=== 21st century ===
The MPD was the lead investigative agency in the May 2001 disappearance of Chandra Levy, a 24-year-old woman from Modesto, California, who was interning at the Federal Bureau of Prisons. The department was criticized for various missteps in the investigation. Levy's remains were discovered more than a year later, on May 22, 2002, in a wooded area of Rock Creek Park.

The MPD also responded to the September 11 attacks of 2001. Charles H. Ramsey, who was the chief of police at the time, later stated in an interview:

We had just finished up a meeting when my chief of staff came in and told me I needed to go into his office and take a look at what was going on in New York. He had the Today Show on and he was looking at images of the first tower burning, the second tower had not yet been hit. I asked what happened and he said nobody seems to know. A small plane based on the way it was described must have flown into the building. Everybody was still kind of not sure if it was an accident, on purpose or whatever and as we were standing there looking we actually saw the second plane strike the second tower. Once the second plane struck they realize that it was an coordinated attack.

The MPD activated its newly built Joint Operations Command Center (JOCC). Although it had not officially opened yet, September 11, 2001, became its first day of operations. While some equipment had been installed, other devices, such as phones, had not and had to be installed on the fly as emergency personnel arrived to respond. Officials from various agencies and departments including the United States Park Police, United States Capitol Police, the FBI, Secret Service, and the FAA's military district arrived to respond. Around that time, they were notified that the Pentagon had been hit as well. Though the Pentagon was located across the river in Arlington County, Virginia, MPD officers still responded to assist with the emergency response. Additionally, MPD officers working in conjunction with U.S. Park Police officers locked down all federal buildings along the National Mall, including establishing a perimeter around the White House.

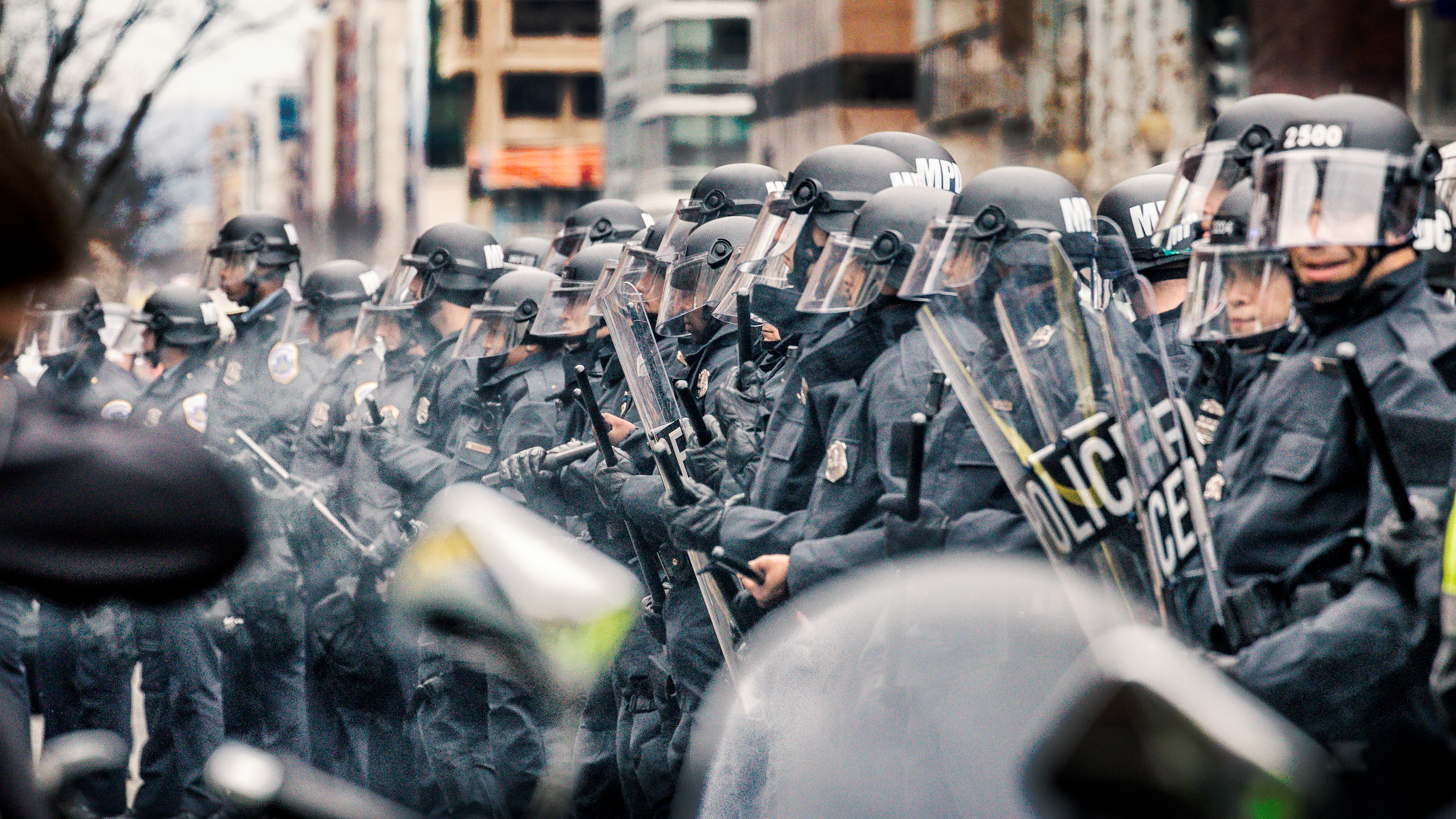
MPD Officers form a riot line during the 2017 presidential Inauguration

The U.S. Park Police had sent its two helicopters to assist with operations at the Pentagon. Shortly thereafter, the flight control tower at Ronald Reagan Washington National Airport was evacuated. Flight control of all airspace over the Washington metro area was turned over to the U.S. Park Police helicopters who coordinated with NORAD. However, needing to assist with evacuating victims, the Park Police requested assistance from MPD. Shortly thereafter, an MPD helicopter arrived and took over command and control of Washington's air space.

That evening, after the majority of the population had returned home and Washington's streets lay empty, Chief Ramsey, his Executive Assistant Chief Terry Gainer, FBI director Robert Mueller, and Secret Service director Brian L. Stafford drove around D.C. to check security measures of the locked-down city. While several officers also wanted to assist with efforts in New York, many had to remain in D.C. and the majority of the department worked 12-hour shifts several weeks after the attacks. Ramsey noted that at the time many, himself included, thought that there were more attacks to come.

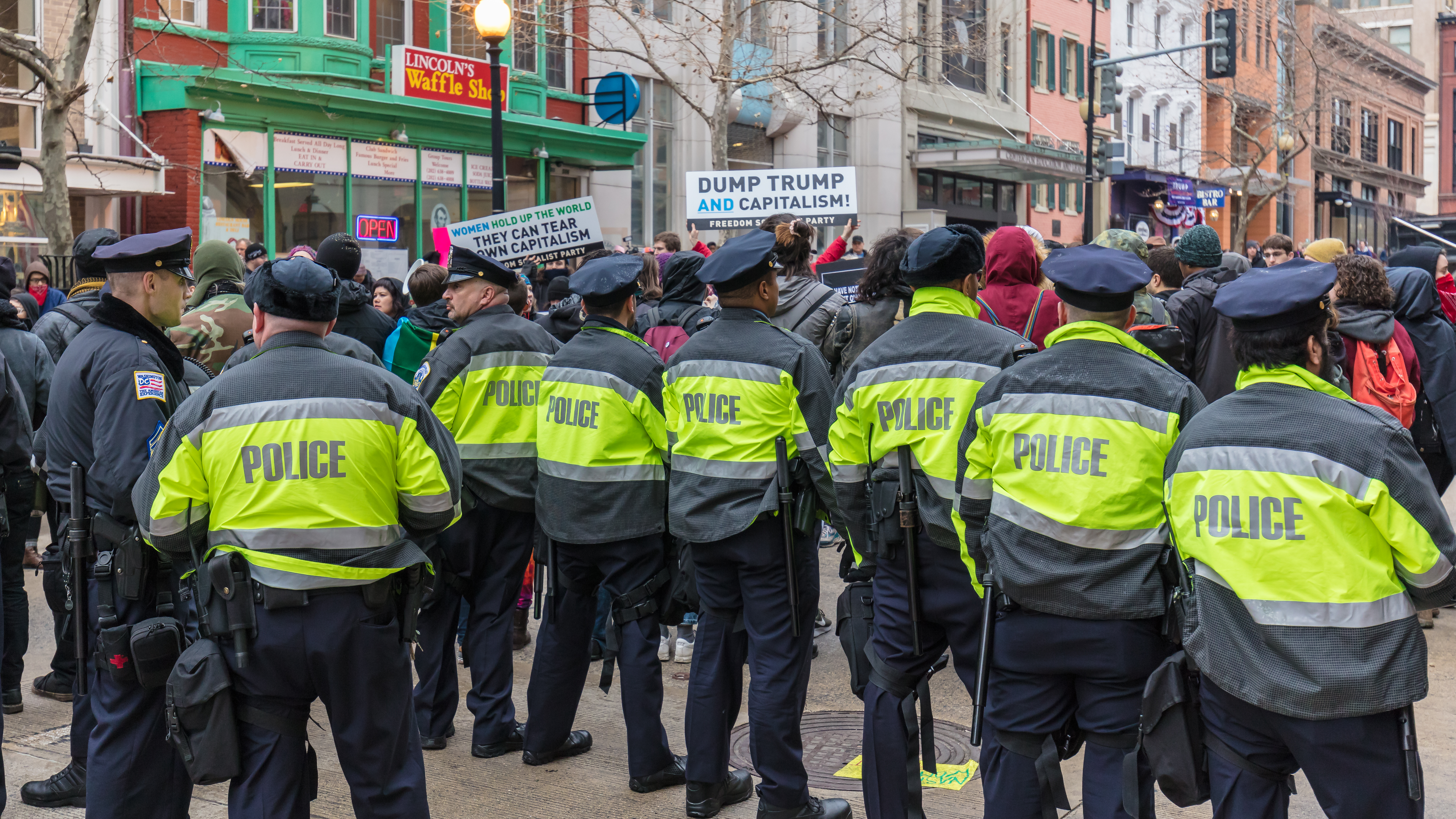
Metropolitan Police Officers at a protest downtown

On January 2, 2007, Cathy L. Lanier took the post of Chief of Police. Lanier, who began her career as a Metropolitan Police patrol officer, became the first female chief of the department. She has been singled out in publications for her community-oriented and technology-driven approach to policing that has helped modernize the MPD and lower crime rates. In 2012 the city attained a lowered homicide rate not seen since 1961. Lanier departed in 2016 to lead security for the National Football League and was succeeded by Peter Newsham, the chief from 2017 to 2021.

On September 16, 2013, MPD officers responded to the Washington Navy Yard for an active shooter in Building 197. Two officers were shot during the over-hour-long search and gunfight. The first, Officer Scott Williams, was hit in both legs during an exchange of gunfire with the shooter, Aaron Alexis. The second, Officer Dorian DeSantis, was a member of MPD's Emergency Response Team. Officer DeSantis was with U.S. Park Police officers Andrew Wong and Carl Hiott and had entered an area of cubicles when Alexis engaged them, striking DeSantis in his tactical vest. Uninjured by the gunshot, DeSantis immediately returned fire and killed Alexis. In all, thirteen people were killed and eight others were injured, three from gunfire. Williams and DeSantis were given the Medal of Valor, Medal of Honor and the Blue Badge Medal on February 20, 2014, during a ceremony to honor them and the 170 law enforcement officers, including 57 MPD officers, who responded and entered the building to search for Alexis.

During the 2021 storming of the United States Capitol, the Metropolitan police were among the agencies called to restore order. The department reported that 58 officers were injured during the assault, several were hospitalized, and at least one was determined to die in the line of duty from injuries received that day, Jeffrey L. Smith.

In May 2021, Distributed Denial of Secrets republished the leak of Washington D.C.'s Metropolitan Police Department, including over 90,000 emails. Among other things, the files revealed details of surveillance of right-wing extremists and the response to the 2021 United States Capitol attack.

On August 11, 2025, President Donald Trump announced his intention to invoke section 740 of the District of Columbia Home Rule Act, enabling the president to assume control over D.C.'s police during times of emergency, for up to 30 days. This ended in September 2025.

== Notable responses ==
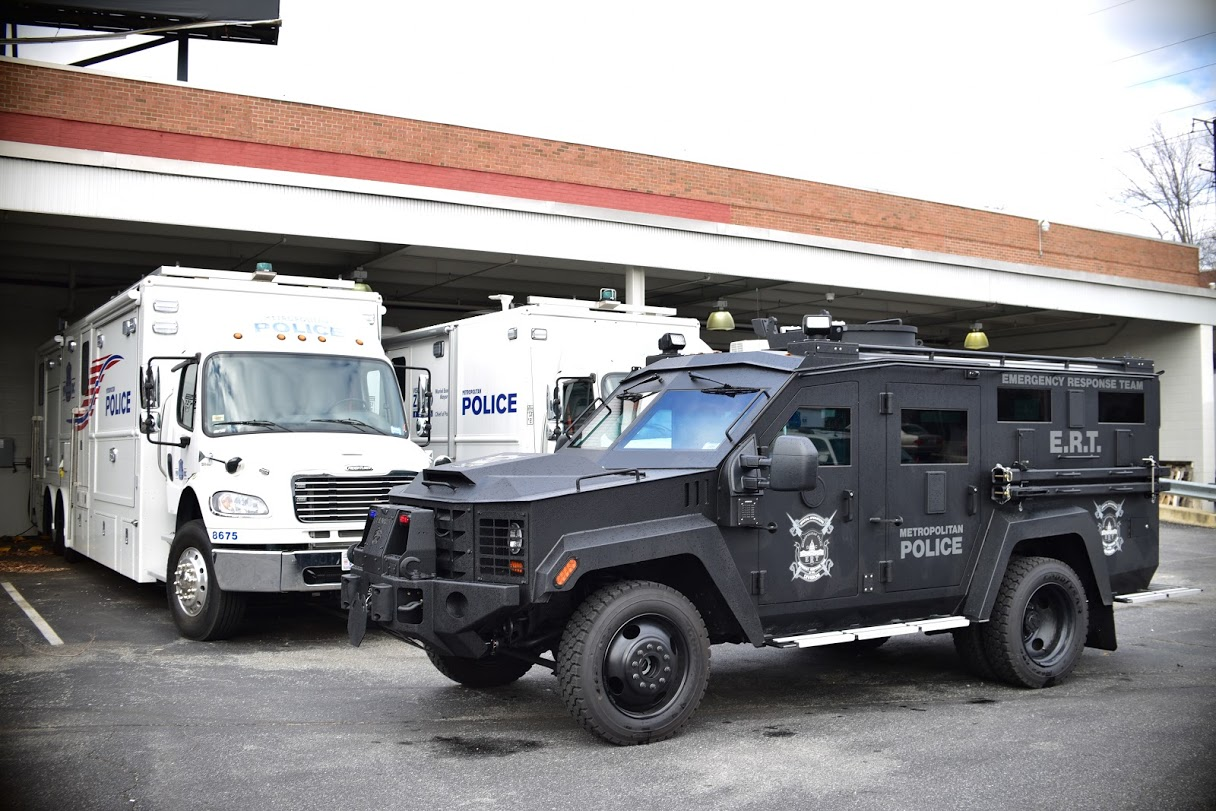
MPD Emergency Response Team vehicles; two Freightliner M2 emergency operations centers and a Lenco BearCat SWAT vehicle

=== September 11 attacks ===
On September 11, 2001, four commercial aircraft were hijacked by Al-Qaeda. Two of the planes were crashed into each of The World Trade Center towers in New York City, one was retaken by passengers and crashed near Shanksville, Pennsylvania, and one was crashed into The Pentagon. All MPD officers were called in to support law enforcement efforts, including those to evacuate the city and protect buildings.

=== Washington Navy Yard shooting ===
On September 16, 2013, Aaron Alexis entered the Washington Navy Yard where he was working as a contractor and carried out the deadliest workplace mass shooting in Washington D.C. history, killing 12. He used a shotgun he had legally purchased days before, and a handgun he had taken from a security guard after fatally shooting him during the attack. His attack lasted 1 hour and 9 minutes before he was fatally shot by a member of the MPD Emergency Response Team (ERT).

=== January 6 United States Capitol attack ===
On January 6, 2021, supporters of Donald Trump, the 45th U.S. president, broke past police barricades and entered the United States Capitol in a failed attempt to overturn his defeat in the 2020 presidential election. MPD was called in to assist the United States Capitol Police. Over 60 MPD officers were injured during their response. The attack resulted in five deaths, including Brian Sicknick, a United States Capitol Police officer.

=== 2025 Potomac River mid-air collision ===
On January 29, 2025, American Eagle Flight 5342, a scheduled domestic passenger flight operated by a Bombardier CRJ700 series airliner, collided mid-air with a United States Army Sikorsky UH-60L Black Hawk helicopter while on final approach to Ronald Reagan Washington National Airport. The flight originated from Wichita Dwight D. Eisenhower National Airport. Both aircraft crashed into the Potomac River, killing all 67 people on board the two aircraft. The Metropolitan Police Department was among several D.C. area emergency services to respond to the crash scene.

== Organization and personnel ==
=== Structure ===
MPD is headed by a chief of police. Other senior leadership members includes an executive assistant chief of police, two patrol chiefs (one North and one South), three assistant chiefs (one each for the Investigative Services, Homeland Security, and Internal Affairs bureaus) and two directors (one for the Corporate Support Bureau and one for the Professional Development Bureau). Each of the district's seven districts is led by a district commander. The First, Sixth and Seventh Districts report to Patrol Services South while the Second, Third, Fourth, and Fifth Districts report to Patrol Services North.

The department has a number of specialized units, including the Robbery Suppression Unit (RSU) and District Crime Suppression Teams (CSTs). Other specialized units in the MPD are under the Special Liaison Branch works with various parts of Washington's population. Within the branch are four units: the Asian Liaison Unit (ALU), the Deaf and Hard of Hearing Liaison Unit (DHHU), the Gay and Lesbian Liaison Unit (GLLU) -- formerly led by internationally recognized leader and retired Lieutenant: Brett Parson, and the Latino Liaison Unit (LLU), which collectively have 196 members. Within MPD's Homeland Security Bureau is the Special Operations Division and the Joint Strategic & Tactical Analysis Command Center. Within the Special Operations Division is the Training Unit, Special Tactics Branch, and the Special Events Branch; the latter two units coordinate with the U.S. Secret Service.

=== Demographics ===
The MPD has had an average of just under 3,800 sworn members. As of the end of 2017, the department had 3,837 sworn personnel and 658 civilian personnel. Of the sworn personnel, there are 3,075 officers and detectives, 146 recruits, 437 sergeants, 116 lieutenants, 35 captains, and 28 command personnel. Among sworn personnel, about 78% were men and 22% were women and, about 52% of sworn personnel were black, 36% were white, 9% were Hispanic, and 4% were Asian. The proportion of African American officers has increased over time; in 1968, African Americans constituted 25% of the department's force and in 1970 constituted 35% of the department's force.

=== Districts ===
The District of Columbia is divided into seven geographical areas designated as "districts" which are numbered 1–7. The districts are then broken up into Patrol Service Areas (PSA). These PSAs are the beats that are served by the patrol units.

District	Commander	Boundaries
First District	Commander Colin Hall	MPD First District boundaries
Second District	Commander Tatjana Savoy	MPD Second District boundaries
Third District	Commander Sean Connors	MPD Third District Boundaries
Fourth District	Commander Nikki Lavenhouse	MPD Fourth District boundaries
Fifth District	Commander Shawn Rooney	MPD Fifth District boundaries
Sixth District	Commander Jaron Hickman	MPD Sixth District boundaries
Seventh District	Commander James Boteler	MPD Seventh District boundaries

=== Detectives ===
Detectives do not hold supervisory authority over a sergeant and above and do not have supervisory authority over uniformed officers except when taking charge of a crime scene. Members who hold the rank of sergeant or above but are assigned to the Criminal Investigation Division or have investigatory duties, are referred to with the "Detective" title in front, e. g. "Detective-Sergeant".

Title	Notes
Detective I	Requires the passing of a multiple-choice test and completing an evaluation phase. This position holds minimal supervisory authority in a detective unit. Requires a minimum of seven years of service, five of which must be spent as a Detective II.
Detective II	Requires completing 1 year as an Detective III.
Detective III	Requires the passing of a multiple-choice test and completing an evaluation phase. This position is a training and evaluation phase for those wanting to become full detectives and lasts approximately one-year before the detective is recommended by a supervisor to be elevated to the rank of Detective II.

=== Training ===
Persons who are hired by the MPD spend at least 28 weeks at the Maurice T. Turner Jr., Metropolitan Police Academy receiving basic instruction in police work to include laws of arrest, search and seizure, criminal law, traffic regulations, human relations, community policing, and ethics. In addition to these they receive specialized skill training in emergency vehicle operations, firearms, first aid, and defensive tactics.

They are then assigned to one of the seven police districts and are assigned to a field training officer (FTO) who continues to monitor their progress and help them to practically apply their training. The entire process lasts through an 18-month probationary period. At the end of the probationary period, officers are certified to patrol on their own, apply to specialized units, and progress through the department's hierarchy.

== Rank structure and uniforms ==
These are the current ranks of the Metropolitan Police Department of the District of Columbia.

Title	Insignia	Uniform	Badge design	Badge color	Duties/responsibilities
Chief of Police		White shirt, blue pants		Gold	The chief of police is head of the MPD.The Chief is appointed by the mayor and confirmed by the DC Council.
Executive assistant chief of police		White Shirt, blue pants		Gold	The Executive Assistant Chief of Police is Second-in-command of the MPD.
Assistant Chief of Police		White shirt, blue pants		Gold	The Assistant Chief of Police is in charge of a Bureau within the MPD.
Commander		White shirt, blue pants		Gold	Commanders are in charge of an MPD district or division.
Inspector		White shirt, blue pants		Gold	Inspectors are Second-in-command of a district or division. Some officers are promoted past this rank from Captain directly to Commander.
Captain		White shirt, blue pants		Gold	Captains are in charge of a Branch or a Police Sector within a district.
Lieutenant		White shirt, blue pants		Gold	Lieutenants are in charge of shift within a district, of a unit, or of a Police Service Area within a Sector.
Sergeant		Blue shirt, blue pants		Gold	Sergeants are front-line supervisors.
Detective I	No Insignia	Blue shirt, blue pants (Plain clothes as day-to-day uniform)		Gold	Requires the passing of a multiple-choice test and completing an evaluation phase. This position holds minimal supervisory authority in a detective unit. Requires a minimum of seven years of service, five of which must be spent as a Detective II.
Detective II	No Insignia	Blue shirt, blue pants (Plain clothes as day-to-day uniform)		Silver	Requires completing 1 year as a Detective III.
Detective III	No Insignia	Blue shirt, blue pants (Plain clothes as day-to-day uniform)		Silver	Requires the passing of a multiple-choice test and completing an evaluation phase. This position is a training and evaluation phase for those wanting to become full detectives and lasts approximately one-year before the detective is recommended by a supervisor to be elevated to the rank of Detective II.
Investigator	No Insignia	Blue shirt, blue pants (Plain clothes as day-to-day uniform)		Silver	Is given to officers assigned to a specialized unit in the Violent Crime Suppression Division (VCSD) who are not detectives but work in an investigative capacity. It is a temporary designation while assigned to the unit.
Master Patrol Officer		Blue shirt, blue pants		Silver	Competitive rank based on exams and seniority. This rank is no longer awarded.
Patrol Officer First Class		Blue shirt, blue pants			Officers who have a total of three years of continuous MPD service with two years of continuous service as a full duty uniformed officer with one of the patrol districts or the Special Operations Division (SOD) are eligible apply for the rank of Patrol Officer First Class.
Police Officer / Senior Police Officer	No insignia	Blue shirt, blue pants		Silver	Base officer rank / Rank held by an officer who has come out of retirement. Holds no supervisor authority.
Recruit officer	No insignia	Tan shirt, tan pants	None	None	

Recruit Officer is the initial rank of oncoming Metropolitan Police officers, held while undergoing training at the Metropolitan Police Academy.

Officers are eligible for the rank of Patrol Officer First Class after three years time in service. Patrol officers first class are given preference, after master patrol officers, in the field testing of new technologies and in the selection of patrol related training.

Master Patrol Officers (MPO) are assigned some of the field training duties, and hold supervisory authority in the absence of a sergeant. The rank of Master Patrol Officer is currently being phased out as the MPD has not held a promotion for the MPO rank in nearly a decade.

The MPD adopts a rank differentiation method via the uniforms worn. Officers up through the rank of Master Patrol Officer wear dark blue shirts and silver badges with 'M.P.D.' insignia pinned on each side of the collar and silver cap plates. Sergeants also wear the same dark blue shirt but they wear gold badges, gold collar insignia, and gold cap plates instead of silver. Uniformed headgear of all ranks consists of an eight-point hat, similar to those worn by the NYPD and San Francisco Police Departments. Baseball hats are permitted and in the winter a watch cap is authorized for wear. For decades prior to 2018, the MPD wore light blue shirts.

In October 2018 the MPD switched to a new uniform for Officers through Sergeants consisting of an outer load bearing vest with a patch on the back saying "METROPOLITAN POLICE" in white lettering. The color of the uniform also changed from the previous light powder blue to a dark navy blue, similar to the NYPD. The new uniform also consists of wool pants with hidden cargo pockets.

Lieutenants and above wear white shirts with gold badges and gold 'M.P.D.' insignia pinned on each side of the collar. Their insignia of rank is displayed on the shoulder epaulets of the uniform (as in the military). The badges and cap plates for higher-ranking officers are gold and engraved with the wearer's rank-title. With the exception of their badges and rank insignia the outer uniform dress is the same for all ranks, but may include a dress blouse with any awarded service ribbons displayed above the officers nametag on their right chest.

== Equipment and vehicles ==
The standard-issue service weapon for MPD officers is the Glock 17 or Glock 19. Officers at the rank of lieutenant or above are authorized to carry the Glock 26. Investigators and Detectives are authorized to carry the Glock 19.

The Emergency Response Team uses the SIG Sauer P226 in 9x19mm as the sidearm instead of the standard issue Glock pistols carried by other units and officers in the agency.

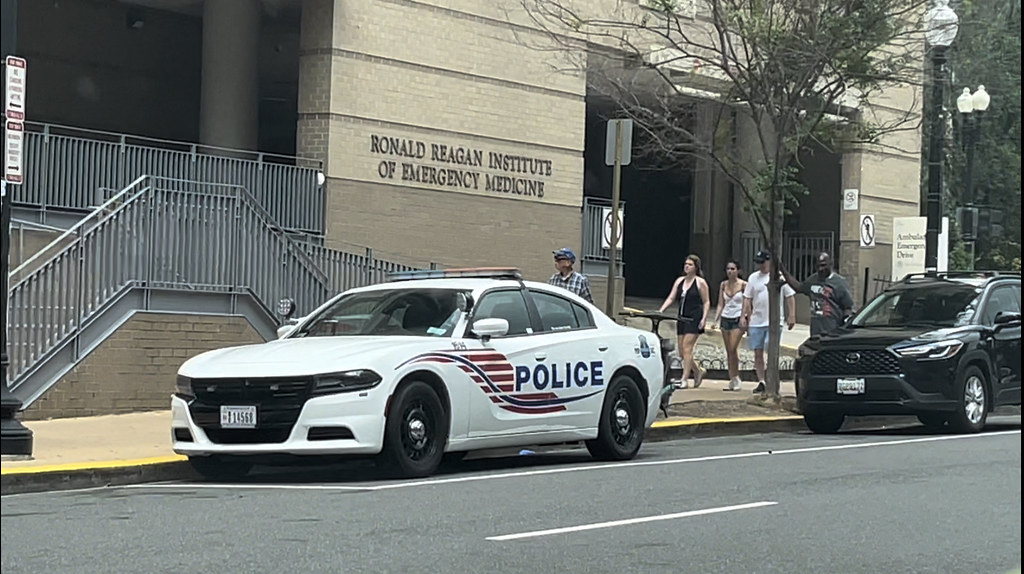
An MPD Dodge Charger, likely used for traffic control, on July 19, 2025

The current colors of MPD vehicles is an all-white body with red stripes and a single blue stripe that waves through the red stripes. The word "POLICE" is printed in large text on the side of the car, and "MPDC", with the MPD shield splitting MP and DC, on the rear quarter panels of the vehicle. The cruiser number is printed on the front fenders of the vehicle. The cruiser number is also printed on the roof of the vehicle as well as on the back right of the vehicle with the district or unit on the back left. The motto "We are here to help" is printed on the rear windows. "METROPOLITAN POLICE" is emblazoned on the back of the vehicle as well. The vehicles are designed and outfitted by Major Police Supply in Laurel, Maryland.

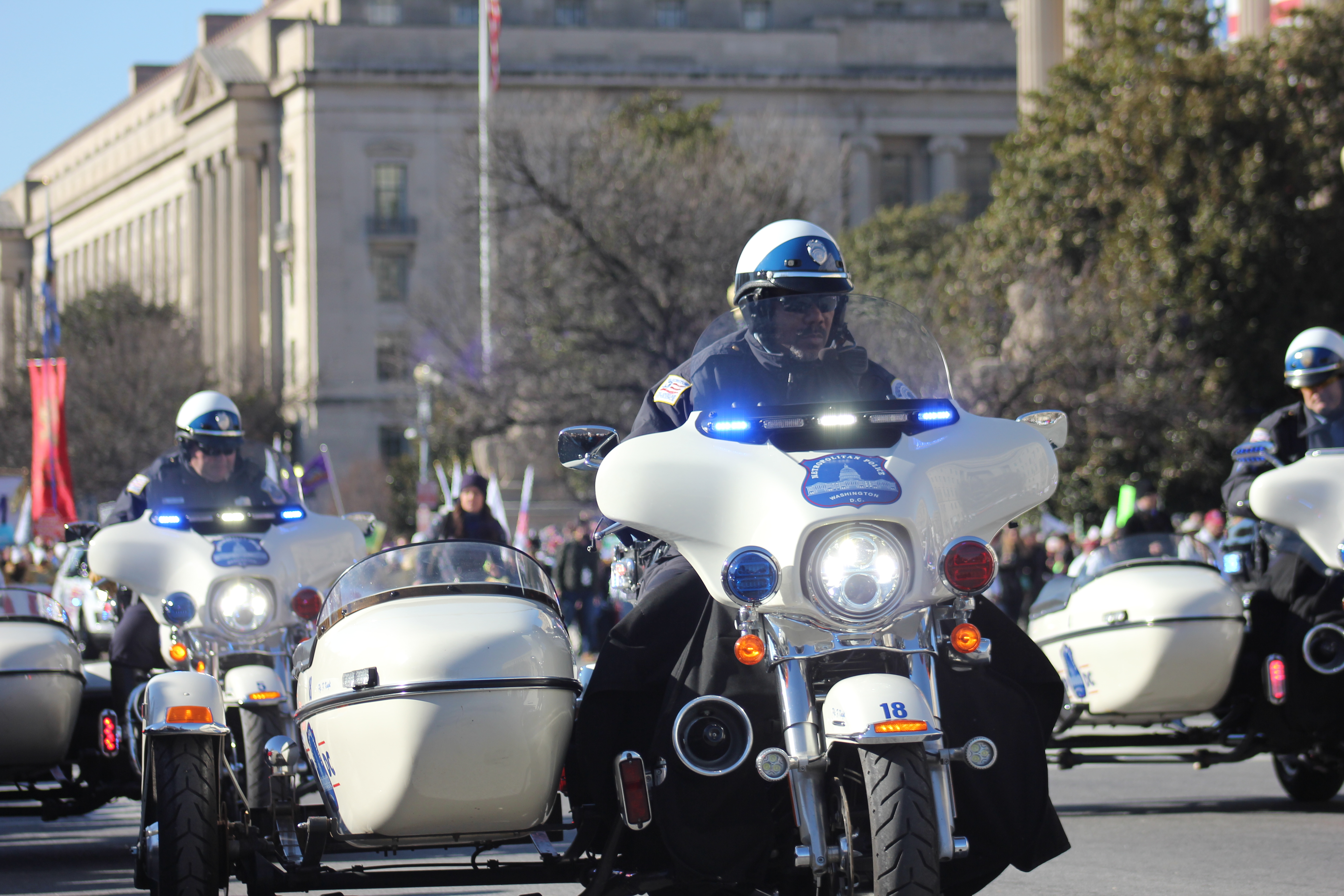
MPD Harley Davidson motorcycles and their unique sidecars

The MPD utilizes a variety of vehicles to support their mission. For patrol operations the department utilizes the Ford Police Interceptor Sedan, Ford Police Interceptor Utility, Chevrolet Impala, Dodge Durango, Ford Fusion, and the Dodge Charger. The Ford Transit Prisoner Transport Van is also utilized by patrol for prisoner transports as well as patrol operations if the district is short on vehicles. The department also utilizes the Chevrolet Malibu, Ford Fusion, Ford Escape, and Chrysler 200. These are typically unmarked and are used by detectives and specialty units such as Crime Suppression Teams. The Special Operations Division (SOD) has a large variety of vehicles including the Eurocopter AS350B3, Lenco Bearcat, and a Freightliner M2 tandem rear axle chassis with a mobile command center van. In addition to the vehicles used by patrol, the SOD also uses the Ford F-150 Police Responder, Chevrolet Tahoe, Harley-Davidson FLHPTI motorcycles, and many others. In 2020, MPD introduced a new fleet of 2020 BMW R1250RT-P motorcycles which were seen during the 2021 presidential inauguration. For the 2025 Presidential Inauguration, MPD re-introduced the Harley Davidson FLHTP as their designated motorcycle.

As of 2018, the MPD maintained a fleet of nearly 1,700 vehicles. This consists of 830 marked police cruisers, 405 unmarked police cruisers, 170 marked other vehicles (such as vans, SUVs, trucks, and command buses), 29 unmarked other vehicles, 134 Honda-Harley scooters, 60 Harley-Davidson FLHTPI motorcycles, 17 boats, and 34 miscellaneous vehicles, including forklifts, traffic machines, and trailers. The MPD also maintains a fleet of police Segways.

== Line-of-duty deaths ==
Since its establishment, 123 MPD officers have died in the line of duty. The most common causes of line-of-duty deaths among MPD officers have been gunfire (61), motorcycle crash (11), automobile crash (9), vehicular assault (7), and accidental gunfire (8).

Cause of Death	Number of Deaths
Accidental	2
Aircraft Accident	2
Animal Related	1
Automobile Crash	9
Bicycle Accident	1
Drowned	3
Duty related illness	2
Fall	3
Gunfire	61
Gunfire (Inadvertent)	8
Heart Attack	5
Motorcycle Crash	11
Stabbed	1
Struck by a Streetcar	1
Struck by a Vehicle	3
Vehicle Pursuit	3
Vehicular Assault	7

== In popular culture ==
The MPD has been featured in several novels, films, and television series. In these depictions it is often, but incorrectly, referred to as the "Metro" Police instead of the "Metropolitan" Police. There is a distinction, as the "Metro Police" is the commonly used name to refer to the police department of the Washington Metropolitan Area Transit Authority, a multi-jurisdictional transportation agency (DC/Maryland/Virginia). The primary jurisdiction of the "Metro Police" is the metropolitan area subway (known as "the Metro") and the bus transit system whereas MPD has jurisdiction throughout Washington, D.C.

=== Novels ===
- Author James Patterson's Alex Cross series features fictional MPD police detective Alex Cross.
- The novels of George Pelecanos, which are largely set in the Washington, D.C. area, have included several major and minor characters who are active or former MPD officers.
- The novels of Margaret Truman feature MPD detectives. The 1997 film Murder at 1600 was based on her first novel. The premise of the novel and film, that an MPD Homicide detective would be the lead investigator for a death that occurs in the White House is factually correct as the MPD has primary jurisdiction over death investigations anywhere in the District of Columbia.
- The 2009 novel True Blue by David Baldacci features a former MPD officer as the protagonist and her older sister who is the chief of police. The chief in the novel was loosely based on Chief Cathy Lanier. Baldacci spent time shadowing MPD officers and interviewed Chief Lanier for the novel.
- Author Philip Scholz's novel Slovo Ne Vorobey is set in Washington, D.C. and features several MPD officers and detectives who are hunting a serial killer.

=== Television ===
- The syndicated CBS television series The District (2000–2004) dramatized the daily goings-on of the police department.
- The online U.S. TV series House of Cards (2013–2018) features the MPD in several episodes, specifically in the first season when they play a prominent role in the development of a cover-up. The police chief is incorrectly portrayed as the police "Commissioner".
- The TV series The Residence features Uzo Aduba as a MPD detective called to the White House to investigate a murder during a state dinner.

=== Film ===
- In the 1943 film Sherlock Holmes in Washington, Sherlock Holmes played by Basil Rathbone, investigates a disappearance with the help of Washington Police.
- Harrison Ford portrays a MPD Internal Affairs Sergeant in the 1999 film Random Hearts.

== See also ==
- Johnny St. Valentine Brown
- Declaring a Crime Emergency in the District of Columbia
- List of law enforcement agencies in the District of Columbia
