= Defense Counterintelligence and Human Intelligence Center =

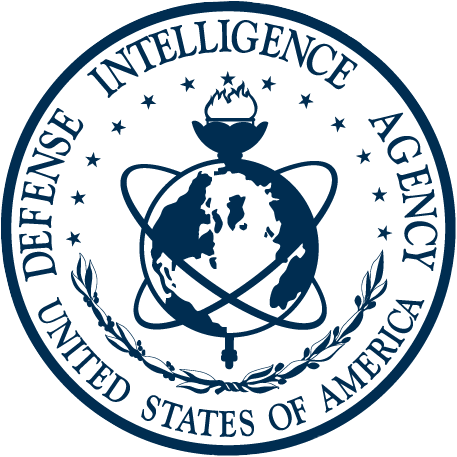

The Defense Counterintelligence and Human Intelligence Center (DCHC) is a component of the United States Defense Intelligence Agency. It is mandated to manage, develop and execute U.S. Department of Defense counterintelligence and human intelligence activities worldwide; it's also responsible for oversight for training, doctrine, policy, information technology architecture, planning and career management.

The DCHC absorbed many functions and authorities of the Counterintelligence Field Activity and the Strategic Support Branch, which were disestablished simultaneously with the DCHC's establishment. Despite the counterintelligence component of its work, the center has no law enforcement authority.

In 2012, Defense Secretary Leon Panetta and Director of National Intelligence James Clapper announced the creation of the Defense Clandestine Service. This has been seen as an upgrading and rebranding of DIA's current HUMINT capabilities.
