= Theater (warfare) =

Area or place where important military events occur or are progressing

In warfare, a theater or theatre is an area in which important military events occur or are in progress. A theater can include the entirety of the airspace, land, and sea area that is—or that may potentially become—involved in war operations.

== Definition ==
In his book On War, Carl von Clausewitz defines Kriegstheater as a "portion of the space over which war prevails". It normally refers to a specific geographic or strategic area within a wider whole, usually with its own objectives and command structure.

== Russian Armed Forces ==
The Russian Armed Forces classifies a large geographic subdivision—such as continental geographic territories with their bordering maritime areas, islands, adjacent coasts and airspace—as a theater. The Russian-language term for a military "theater" is театр военных действий, teatr voennykh deistvii (literally: "theater of military operations"), abbreviated ТВД, TVD.

This geographical division aids strategic and operational planning, allowing military operations of fronts. Fronts were originally named in accordance with their theater of operations; for example the Southwestern Front (Russian Empire) (1914–1918), the 1st Ukrainian Front (1943–1945, which fought in Ukraine, Poland, Germany, and Czechoslovakia), and the Northern Front (Soviet Union) (June to August 1941). In peacetime, lacking the urgencies of a strategic direction, fronts were transformed into military regions (districts) responsible for an assigned section of operations.

In 1986 the U.S. Department of Defense's Soviet Military Power identified ten continental and four oceanic TVDs, however, most being merely geographical areas without forces or headquarters: North American, South American, African, Australian, Antarctic, Arctic Ocean, Atlantic, Indian Ocean, and Pacific. Four others - the Far Eastern, Western, South-Western, and Southern, had identified headquarters established in 1979 and 1984. Plans appear to have existed to form a Northwestern TVD headquarters on the basis of the Staff of the Leningrad Military District.

In their most modern form, High Commands for the TVDs were first reestablished in February 1979 for the Far East. Harrison wrote in the 2020s that the new command encompassed the Far East Military District and the Transbaikal Military District. An official military encyclopedia published after the Fall of the Soviet Union stated, said Harrison, that the Soviet Pacific Fleet, an air army, and an air defence corps were also operationally subordinated to the new formation; and that the high command "coordinated" with the armies of Vietnam, Laos, Cambodia, and Mongolia. The headquarters was set up at Ulan-Ude, near Lake Baikal. The RAND Corporation said in 1984 that the Soviet air and ground forces in Mongolia [subordinate to the Transbaikal Military District] and elements of the Mongolian Ground Forces and Mongolian Air Force were also at its disposal. In September 1984 three more High Commands were established: the Western (HQ Legnica), South-Western (HQ Kishinev), and Southern (HQ Baku).

== United States ==
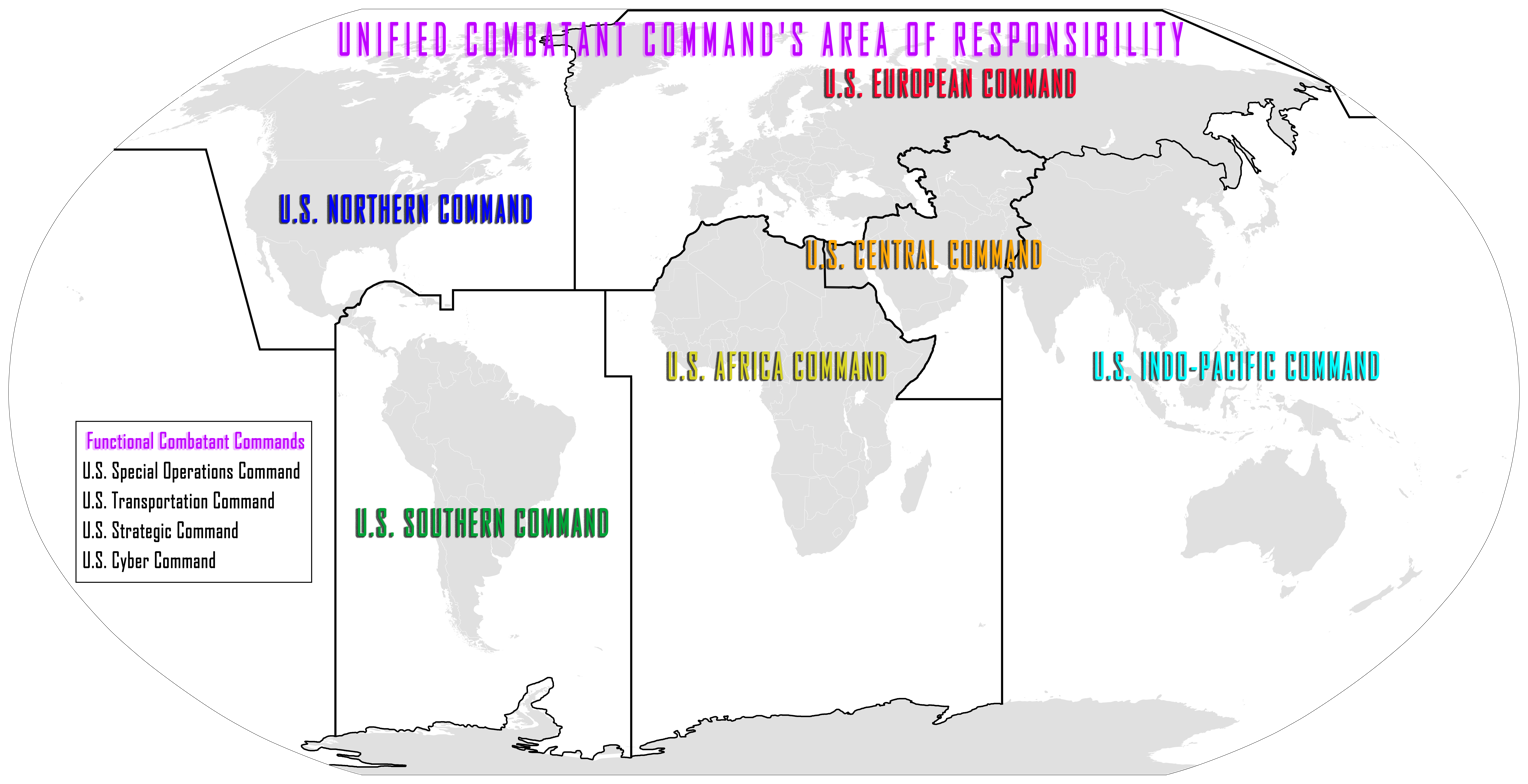
Unified Combatant Command of the United States

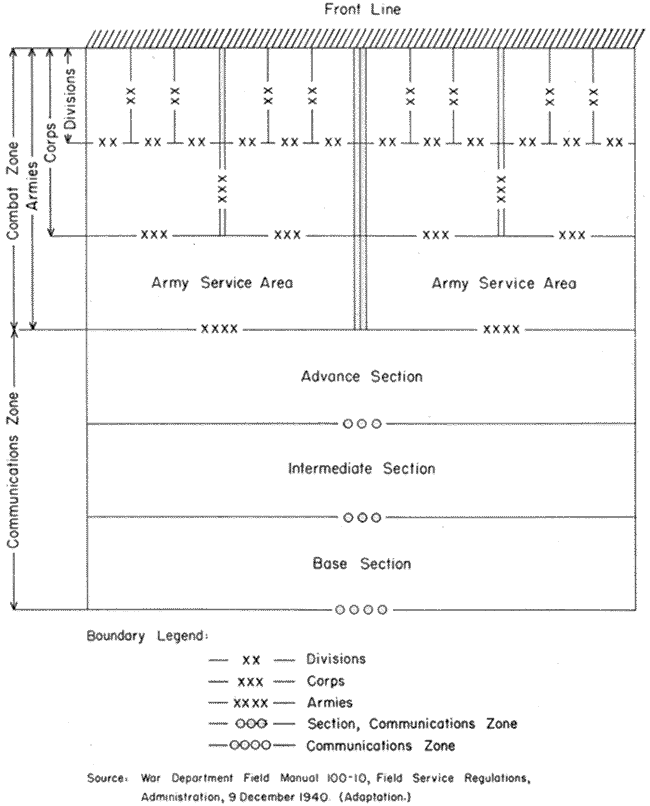
Chart 12 - typical organization of a theater of operations as envisaged by War Department Doctrine, 1940

The term theater of operations was defined in the American field manuals as the land and sea areas to be invaded or defended, including areas necessary for administrative activities incident to the military operations (chart 12). In accordance with the experience of World War I, it was usually conceived of as a large land mass over which continuous operations would take place and was divided into two chief areas—the combat zone, or the area of active fighting, and the communications zone, or area required for administration of the theater. As the armies advanced, both these zones and the areas into which they were divided would shift forward to new geographic areas of control.

== See also ==
=== Concepts ===
- Battlespace

=== By country ===
China

- Theater command, a joint military command of the People's Liberation Army

Soviet Union

- Formations of the Soviet Army

United States

- AfPak, a neologism to designate Afghanistan and Pakistan as a single theater of operations
- Unified combatant command, joint military command from two or more service branches
- Western theater of the American Civil War

=== World War II ===
- Asiatic-Pacific theater
- China Burma India theater
- European theatre of World War II
- European Theater of Operations, United States Army
- Mediterranean Theater of Operations, United States Army
- Pacific Ocean theater of World War II
- South West Pacific theatre of World War II

== Sources ==
- Harrison, Richard W. (July 2022). The Soviet Army's High Commands in War and Peace, 1941–1992. Casemate Academic. ISBN 9781952715112.
- Holm, Michael (2015). "High Commands (Theatre Commands)".
- Odom, William E. (1998). The Collapse of the Soviet Military. New Haven and London: Yale University Press.
- Warner, Edward; Bonan; Packman (April 1984). Key Personnel and Organisations of the Soviet Military High Command (PDF). RAND Notes. RAND Corporation. Archived (PDF) from the original on 2014-05-31.
