= DIA Memorial Wall =

Memorial to DIA employees

Patriots Memorial
- Defense Intelligence Agency
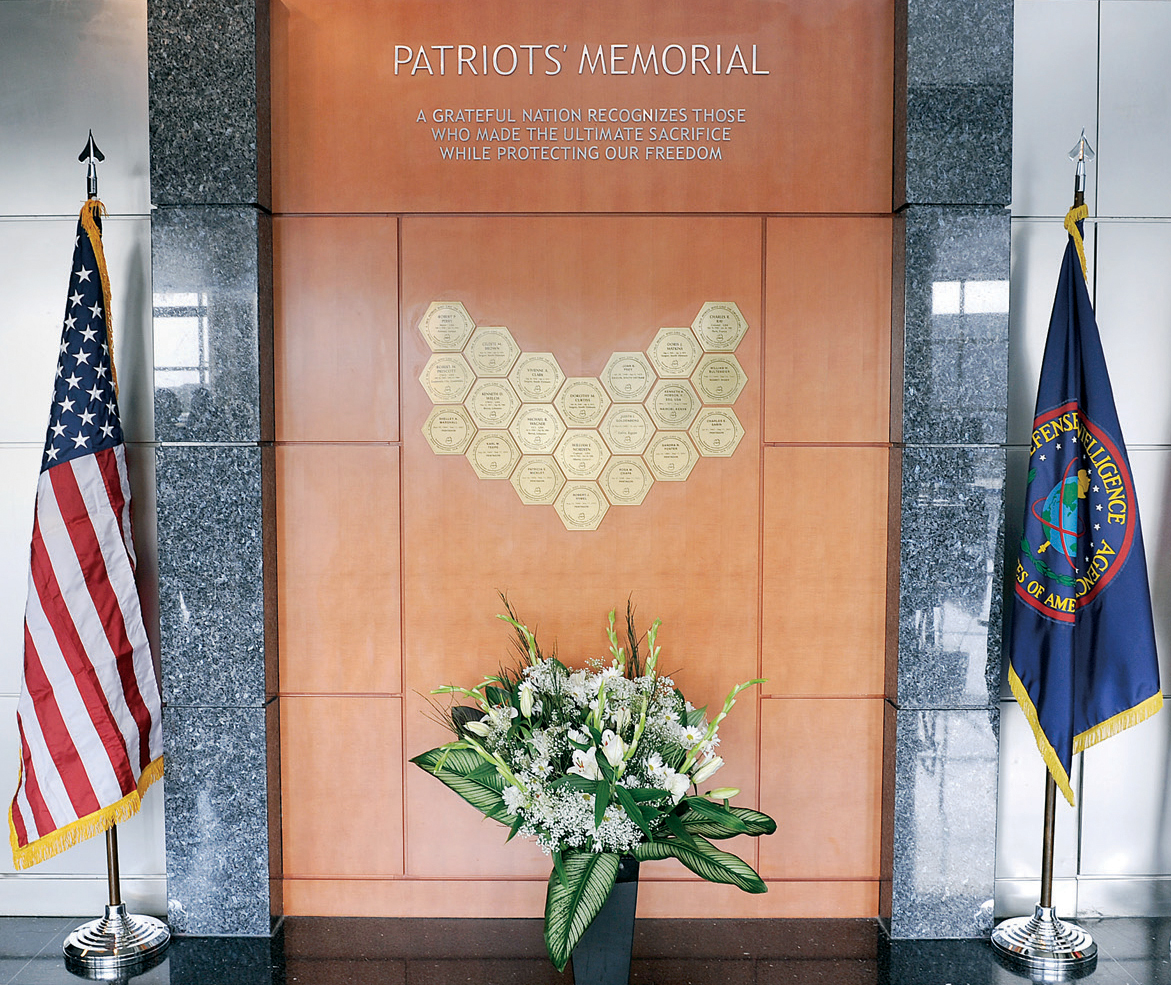
- A dated photo of the golden honeycombs as of 2004.
- For DIA employees who died in the line of service
- Dedicated: 1988 by LTG Leonard Perroots
- Location: Joint Base Anacostia-Bolling, Washington, D.C., U.S.
- Commemorated: 27
- "A grateful nation recognize those who made the ultimate sacrifice while protecting our freedom"

The Defense Intelligence Agency Memorial Wall, commonly known as the Patriots Memorial, is a memorial at DIA headquarters in Washington, D.C., dedicated to those agency employees who lost their lives in the line of their intelligence work whose deaths are not classified. Each loss is represented by an inscription in a "golden honeycomb". In March 2009, the memorial was redesigned and moved to a new location within DIA headquarters.

== History and description ==
The wall was first dedicated on 14 December 1988 by Director Leonard Perroots at DIA headquarters, honoring those DIA personnel "who died in the service of the United States". It "commemorates the profound individual sacrifices made on behalf of the United States by DIA members and acts as a reminder of the selflessness, dedication, and courage required to confront national challenges..."

== Criteria for inclusion ==
The DIA does not provide detailed criteria on who is eligible for inclusion on the memorial. The wall is presumably not exhaustive due to omission of DIA personnel with links to classified missions, such as DIA officer Charles Dennis McKee, who died as a result of the Lockerbie bombing. McKee is notably absent on the DIA wall, whereas his CIA partner Matthew Gannon is honored on the CIA Memorial Wall. The majority of the disclosed DIA fatalities are either a result of terrorist attacks or accidents and acts of violence directed against overt employees. While CIA has a practice of marking the deaths of its private contractors on its memorial wall, the number of DIA contractor losses, if any, is unknown.

=== Controversy in counting personnel ===
Unlike the more expansive memorial at the DIA's fellow defense agency the NSA – which includes members of all military elements operating on behalf of or assigned to the NSA – the DIA's interpretation of "personnel" and what it means to die in the line of duty has remained opaque to the public. During Operation Babylift, the U.S. Defense Attache Office (DAO), a branch of the DIA, lost 35 personnel, but of these the DIA included only five individuals on its memorial wall, excluding the remaining 30 deaths of DAO staff. This type of unclear accounting led to some controversy before the DIA memorial was even created. In 1983, American citizen Jim Poulton threatened to sue the U.S. government for records after repeatedly failing to confirm whether his parents Orin Poulton and June Poulton, who perished during Operation Babylift, were DIA employees. Following years of wrangling, it was revealed that Orin, although working for the DIA's Defense Attache Office at the time, was actually being paid by the U.S. Navy, and as such was not considered a member DIA personnel for bookkeeping purposes. Similarly, June Poulton was a civilian paid by the U.S. Army. Kenneth E. Geisen, the DIA spokesperson at the time, said "I'm not denying it. I'm not confirming it...DIA would have no reason to cover up anything". When asked about honoring these civilians on war memorials, the DIA spokesperson said that "Well, [dying while] coming back on an airplane [during the Vietnam War] is just like getting killed on the Beltway here in a car accident". The Poulton family was billed thousands of dollars for coffins and transportation for the bodies of Orin and June, but they refused to pay; in the end, the government did not insist on payment.

== Individuals memorialized ==
Date of Death	Name	Cause of Death
1970
10 June 1970	Major Robert P. Perry, USA	Shot and killed by a Fatah gunman in Amman, Jordan, while serving as an assistant military attaché. Perry was returning home with his wife and children and was shot through the front door of his house as he opened it for his family.
1975
4 April 1975	Celeste M. Brown	Killed in the 1975 crash of a U.S. Air Force C-5 Galaxy during an emergency landing at Tan Son Nhut Air Base, South Vietnam. The flight was supporting Operation Babylift.
4 April 1975	Vivienne A. Clark	Killed in the 1975 crash of a U.S. Air Force C-5 Galaxy during an emergency landing at Tan Son Nhut Air Base, South Vietnam. The flight was supporting Operation Babylift.
4 April 1975	Dorothy M. Curtiss	Killed in the 1975 crash of a U.S. Air Force C-5 Galaxy during an emergency landing at Tan Son Nhut Air Base, South Vietnam. The flight was supporting Operation Babylift.
4 April 1975	Joan K. Pray	Killed in the 1975 crash of a U.S. Air Force C-5 Galaxy during an emergency landing at Tan Son Nhut Air Base, South Vietnam. The flight was supporting Operation Babylift.
4 April 1975	Doris J. Watkins	Killed in the 1975 crash of a U.S. Air Force C-5 Galaxy during an emergency landing at Tan Son Nhut Air Base, South Vietnam. The flight was supporting Operation Babylift.
20 December 1975	Nicholas G. Shadrin	Abducted by the KGB in Vienna, Austria, and died while being renditioned to Czechoslovakia. A former Soviet Navy commander who defected to the United States in 1959, Shadrin was working in DIA's Soviet Directorate when he was abducted. The official account of his death and location of his body remain unknown.
1982
18 January 1982	Colonel Charles R. Ray, USA	Assassinated in Paris, France, by a Lebanese communist militant of the Lebanese Armed Revolutionary Faction while serving as an assistant military attaché.
1984
21 January 1984	Chief Warrant Officer Robert W. Prescott, USA	Killed in the crash of a Guatemalan Air Force transport plane shortly after takeoff from Guatemala City, Guatemala. Prescott and ten Guatemalans were carrying supplies to Petén on a routine flight when the aircraft developed mechanical issues.
20 September 1984	Chief Warrant Officer Kenneth D. Welch, USA	Killed in the 1984 US embassy bombing in Beirut, Lebanon, by Hezbollah.
20 September 1984	Petty Officer First Class Michael R. Wagner, USN	Killed in the 1984 US embassy bombing in Beirut, Lebanon, by Hezbollah.
1988
28 June 1988	Captain William E. Nordeen, USN	Killed by a car bomb in Athens, Greece, by the 17 November group. One of five American embassy workers targeted by the Marxist guerilla group, Nordeen, had been serving as a naval attaché driving to work when the group remotely triggered a 50lb bomb as he drove by. His car was blown across the street into a fence, and he was ejected from the vehicle.
1996
15 July 1996	Judith I. Goldenberg	Stabbed to death in a random act of violence in Cairo, Egypt. A biographer on temporary duty with the Defense Attaché Office, she was killed in the lobby of her hotel. The attacker was arrested at the scene.
1998
7 August 1998	Staff Sergeant Kenneth R. Hobson II, USA	Killed in the bombing of the U.S. Embassy in Nairobi, Kenya, by al-Qaeda.
2000
23 December 2000	William W. Bultemeier	Killed by a random act of violence in an attempted carjacking in Niamey, Niger.
2001
September 11, 2001	Rosa M. Chapa	All were assigned to the Office of the Comptroller at the Pentagon.
September 11, 2001	Sandra N. Foster	All were assigned to the Office of the Comptroller at the Pentagon.
September 11, 2001	Robert J. Hymel	All were assigned to the Office of the Comptroller at the Pentagon.
September 11, 2001	Shelley A. Marshall	All were assigned to the Office of the Comptroller at the Pentagon.
September 11, 2001	Patricia E. Mickley	All were assigned to the Office of the Comptroller at the Pentagon.
September 11, 2001	Charles E. Sabin	All were assigned to the Office of the Comptroller at the Pentagon.
September 11, 2001	Karl W. Teepe	All were assigned to the Office of the Comptroller at the Pentagon.
2004
26 April 2004	Sergeant Sherwood R. Baker, ARNG	Killed in Baghdad, Iraq, while providing security for members of the Iraq Survey Group. The group was inspecting a suspected weapons of mass destruction facility when there was a large explosion. Baker was a member of the Pennsylvania Army National Guard while Roukey was assigned to an Army Reserve unit based out of Saco, Maine.
26 April 2004	Sergeant Lawrence A. Roukey, USAR	Killed in Baghdad, Iraq, while providing security for members of the Iraq Survey Group. The group was inspecting a suspected weapons of mass destruction facility when there was a large explosion. Baker was a member of the Pennsylvania Army National Guard while Roukey was assigned to an Army Reserve unit based out of Saco, Maine.
8 November 2004	Sergeant Don A. Clary, USA	Killed in Baghdad, Iraq, by a vehicle-borne improvised explosive device (VBIED) while providing security for the Iraq Survey Group as members of the ISG Director's Personal Security Detail. As the insurgent charged the director's vehicle, they placed their vehicle between the insurgent and the protectee, saving the lives of all others present. Both were members of the Kansas Army National Guard.
8 November 2004	Sergeant First Class Clinton L. Wisdom, USA	Killed in Baghdad, Iraq, by a vehicle-borne improvised explosive device (VBIED) while providing security for the Iraq Survey Group as members of the ISG Director's Personal Security Detail. As the insurgent charged the director's vehicle, they placed their vehicle between the insurgent and the protectee, saving the lives of all others present. Both were members of the Kansas Army National Guard.
2019
16 January 2019	Scott A. Wirtz	Killed in Syria in the 2019 Manbij bombing by ISIS.
