= Msic =

The abbreviation MSIC can stand for

- Missile and Space Intelligence Center, an American military intelligence agency component
- multi-strip ionization chamber (sometimes also dubbed as MuSIC), a type of radiation detector
- Mixed Signal Integrated Circuit, a type of integrated circuit
