= DIAC (disambiguation) =

DIAC is a four-letter acronym that may stand for:

- DIode for Alternating Current, a bidirectional trigger diode
- Department of Immigration and Citizenship, an Australian government department
- Dental Industry Association of Canada
- Disability Information & Advice Centre, a British charity
- Design Industry Advisory Committee
- Defense Intelligence Analysis Center, the former name of the Defense Intelligence Agency Headquarters
- Dubai International Academic City
