= John T. Hughes =

John T. Hughes may refer to:

- John T. Hughes (Confederate officer) (1817–1862), colonel in the Missouri State Guard and Confederate Army
- John T. Hughes (politician) (1873–1921), American politician from Arizona, member of the 1st Arizona state legislature
- John T. Hughes (intelligence officer), U.S. Defense Intelligence Agency officer
