= Clandestine service =

Clandestine service may refer to:

- Espionage
- Defense Clandestine Service, a part of the Defense Intelligence Agency
- National Clandestine Service, a part of the CIA
