= Ronald Montaperto =

American spy for China

Ronald N. Montaperto is a former Defense Intelligence Agency (DIA) analyst who pleaded guilty in June 2006 to mishandling classified documents. U.S. officials said the disclosures by Montaperto coincided with the loss of a major electronic eavesdropping program which had successfully spied on Chinese government links to illicit arms sales. Montaperto was sentenced to three months in jail.

Montaperto, 66, joined the DIA in 1981 and eight years later sought a post at the CIA. Eventually, suspicions were raised that he was a spy for China. He was first identified in the late 1990s by a Chinese defector as one of ten "dear friends" who were informal agents of the Chinese government. An investigation into his links to Chinese intelligence in 1991 was dropped due to a lack of evidence. During questioning by investigators in Hawaii in 2003, when he was dean of the Asia-Pacific Center for Security Studies, Montaperto stated he verbally gave Col. Yang and Col. Yu both "secret" and "top secret" classified information. He was arrested in February 2004 for providing Chinese military attaches with classified information.

Montaperto, who claimed that he was tricked, served a three-month sentence in jail, in part due to letters of support from other intelligence analysts. One such supporter, Lonnie Henley, was initially reprimanded by the Office of the Director of National Intelligence (ODNI) for his accusations of malfeasance by the FBI during the investigation of Montaperto.

== See also ==
- Chinese espionage in the United States
