= Victor Kaliadin =

Victor Kaliadin (Russian: Виктор Калядин; 1949 – September 16, 2004) was the CEO of a Russian company "Elers Electron" (Russian: Элерс электрон). In 2001, he was sentenced to 14 years in prison by a Russian court for selling a ring run by a Defense Intelligence Agency (DIA) agent technical information on Arena, the Russian active protection system for tanks.

== Death ==
Because of Kaliadin's rapidly deteriorating health, three years into his sentence he was temporarily transferred to the city hospital of Lipetsk, where he died of his fourth heart attack in 2004. His wife, Ludmila, said that she intended to sue the Russian government for refusing to conduct appropriate medical screenings for her husband, who she claimed was eligible for release because of his health conditions.
