= Defense Intelligence Agency =

U.S. DoD combat support agency

- Seal of DIA

Agency overview
- Formed: October 1, 1961; 65 years ago
- Headquarters: DIA Headquarters, Joint Base Anacostia–Bolling, Washington, D.C.
- Motto: Committed to Excellence in Defense of the Nation
- Employees: More than 16,500
- Annual budget: Classified
- Agency executives: Lieutenant General James H. Adams III, Director; Christine L. Bordine, Deputy Director; Kirstin L. Schlereth, Chief of Staff (acting); Major General Robert I. Kinney, Mobilization Assistant to the Director
- Parent department: Department of Defense
- Website: dia.mil

The Defense Intelligence Agency (DIA) is an intelligence agency and combat support agency of the United States Department of Defense (DoD) specializing in military intelligence.

A component of the Department of Defense and the Intelligence Community (IC), DIA informs national civilian and defense policymakers about the military intentions and capabilities of foreign governments and non-state actors. It also provides intelligence assistance, integration and coordination across uniformed military service intelligence components, which remain structurally separate from DIA. The agency's role encompasses the collection and analysis of military-related foreign political, economic, industrial, geographic, and medical and health intelligence. DIA produces approximately one-quarter of all intelligence content that goes into the President's Daily Brief.

DIA's intelligence operations extend beyond the zones of combat, and approximately half of its employees serve overseas at hundreds of locations and in U.S. embassies in 140 countries. The agency specializes in the collection and analysis of human-source intelligence (HUMINT), both overt and clandestine, while also handling U.S. military-diplomatic relations abroad. DIA concurrently serves as the national manager for the highly technical measurement and signature intelligence (MASINT) and as the Defense Department manager for counterintelligence programs. The agency has no law enforcement authority, contrary to occasional portrayals in American popular culture.

DIA is a national-level intelligence organization which does not belong to a single military element or within the traditional chain of command, instead answering to the secretary of defense directly through the under secretary of defense for intelligence. Around 2008, three-quarters of the agency's 17,000 employees were career civilians who were experts in various fields of defense and military interest or application; and although no military background is required, 48% of agency employees have some past military service. DIA has a tradition of marking unclassified deaths of its employees on the organization's Memorial Wall.

Established in 1961 under President John F. Kennedy by Defense Secretary Robert McNamara, DIA was involved in U.S. intelligence efforts throughout the Cold War and rapidly expanded, both in size and scope, after the September 11 attacks. Because of the sensitive nature of its work, the spy organization has been embroiled in numerous controversies, including those related to its intelligence-gathering activities, to its role in torture, as well as to attempts to expand its activities on U.S. soil.

== Overview ==
The director of the Defense Intelligence Agency is an intelligence officer who is nominated by the U.S. president and confirmed by the U.S. Senate. The director is the primary intelligence adviser to the secretary of defense and also answers to the director of national intelligence. The director is also the commander of the Joint Functional Component Command for Intelligence, Surveillance and Reconnaissance, a subordinate command of United States Strategic Command, which is headquartered in Omaha, Nebraska. Additionally, the director chairs the Military Intelligence Board, which coordinates activities of the entire US defense intelligence community.

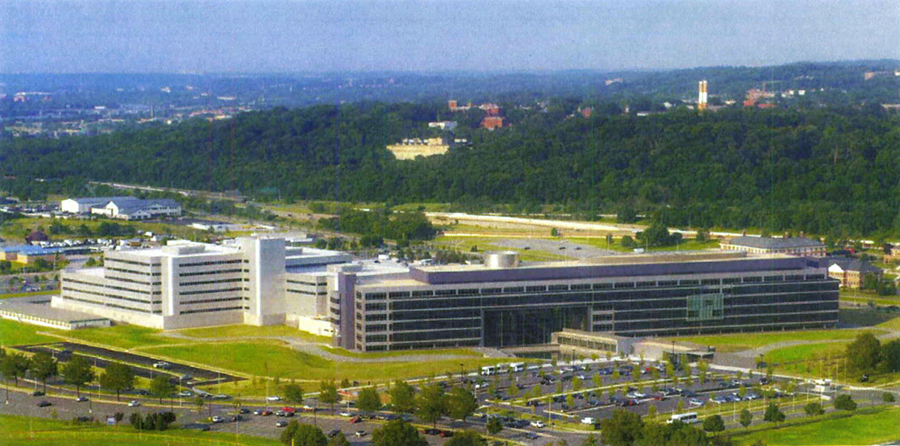
Bird's eye view of DIA HQ from the Potomac in Washington, DC

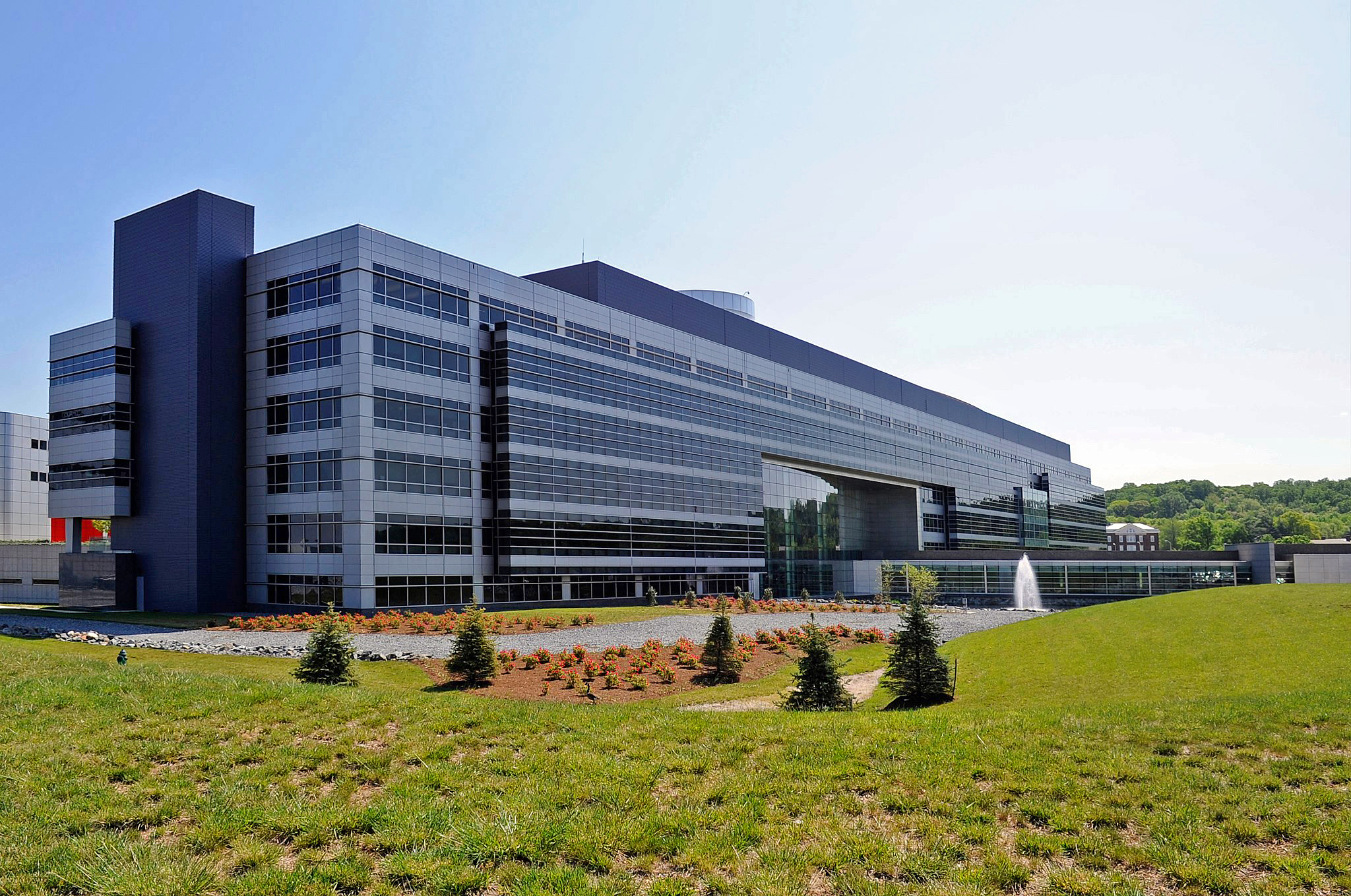
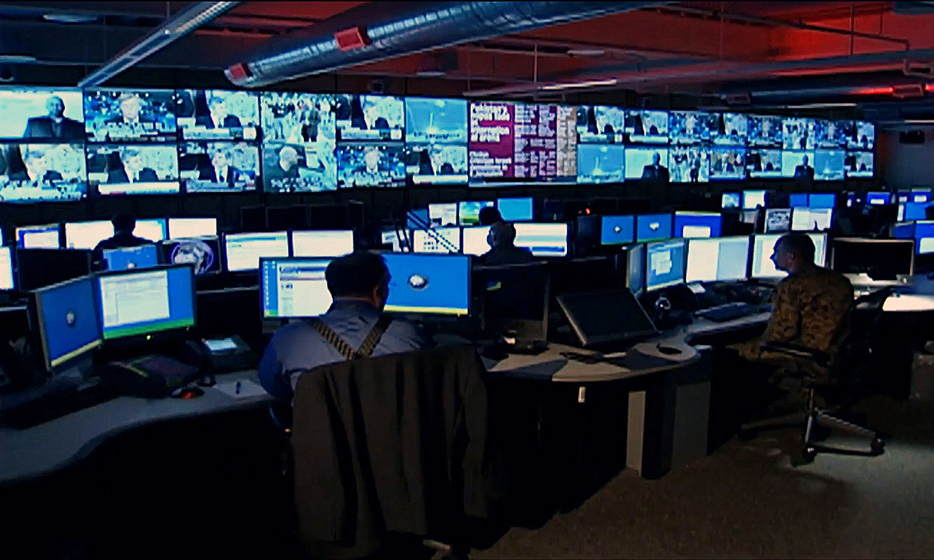
The 450,000 sq ft (42,000 m^{2}) south wing of DIA HQ (left), one of DIA's 24/7 watch centers (right)

DIA is headquartered in Washington, D.C., on Joint Base Anacostia–Bolling with major operational activities at the Pentagon and at each Unified Combatant Command, as well as in more than a hundred U.S. embassies around the world, where it deploys alongside other government partners (e.g., the CIA) and also operates the U.S. Defense Attache Offices. Additionally, the agency has staff deployed at the Col. James N. Rowe Building at Rivanna Station in Charlottesville, Virginia, National Center for Medical Intelligence (NCMI) in Fort Detrick, Maryland, Missile and Space Intelligence Center (MSIC) in Huntsville, Alabama, Russell-Knox Building on Marine Corps Base Quantico, National Center for Credibility Assessment at Fort Jackson, South Carolina, and Defense Intelligence Support Center (DISC) in Reston, Virginia. Since 2012, the Intelligence Community Campus-Bethesda in Maryland serves as the location of the National Intelligence University as well as a facility for DIA and the Office of the Director of National Intelligence.

== Comparison to other intelligence community members ==
=== CIA ===
DIA and the Central Intelligence Agency (CIA) are distinct organizations with different functions. DIA focuses on national level defense-military topics, while CIA is concentrated on broader, more general intelligence needs of the U.S. president and his Cabinet. Additionally, due to DIA's designation as a combat support agency, it has special responsibilities in meeting intelligence requirements specifically for the Secretary of Defense, the Joint Chiefs of Staff (JCS), and Combatant Commanders, both in peace and at war. Although there are misconceptions in the media and public about the DIA–CIA rivalry, the two agencies have a mutually beneficial relationship and division of labor. According to a former senior U.S. official who worked with both agencies, "the CIA doesn't want to be looking for surface-to-air missiles in Libya" while it is also tasked with evaluating the Syrian opposition. CIA and DIA Operations Officers all go through the same type of clandestine training at Camp Peary, an interagency Defense installation under CIA administration better known in popular culture by its CIA nickname "The Farm".

=== DIA and the military services ===
DIA is not a collective of all U.S. military intelligence units and the work it performs is not in lieu of that falling under intelligence components of individual services. Unlike the Russian GRU, which encompasses equivalents of nearly all joint U.S. military intelligence operations, DIA assists and coordinates the activities of individual service-level intelligence units (i.e. 25 AF, INSCOM, etc.), but they nevertheless remain separate entities. As a general rule, DIA handles national-level, long-term and strategic intelligence needs, whereas service-level intelligence components handle tactical, short-term goals pertinent to their respective services. DIA does, however, lead coordination efforts with the military intelligence units and with the national DOD intelligence services (NSA, NGA, NRO) in its role as chair of the Military Intelligence Board and through the co-located Joint Functional Component Command for Intelligence, Surveillance and Reconnaissance.

The Military Intelligence Integrated Database (MIDB) is due to be replaced by the Machine-Assisted Analytic Rapid-Repository System (MARS) beginning in spring 2024.

== Organization ==
DIA is organized into four directorates and five regional centers

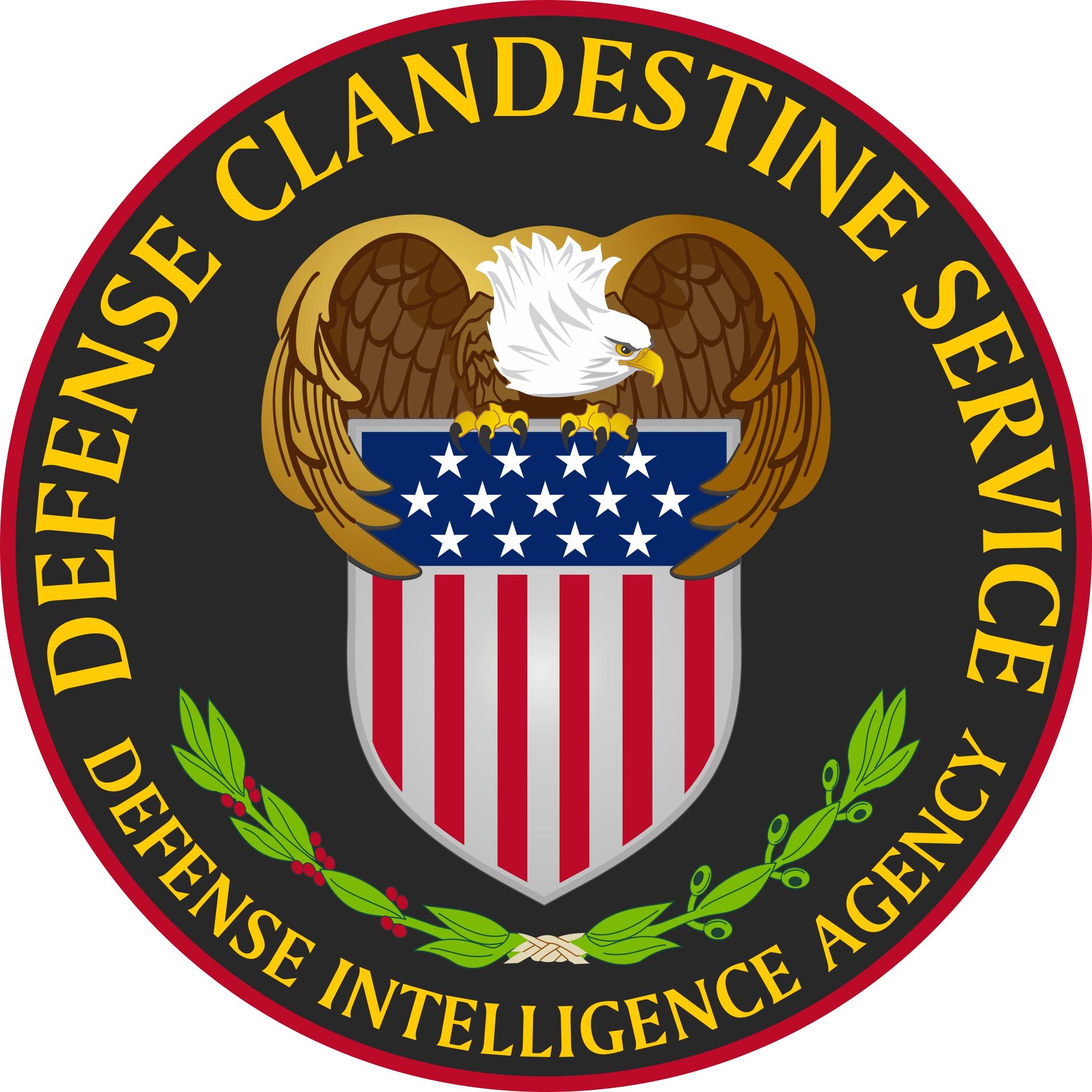

Directorate for Operations:

- Defense Clandestine Service (DCS): DCS conducts clandestine espionage activities around the world and is the executive agent for human intelligence operations throughout the Department of Defense. Staffed by civilian and military personnel, the DCS is a consolidation of the former Defense Human Intelligence Service and works in conjunction with the Central Intelligence Agency's Directorate of Operations, among other national HUMINT entities. It globally deploys teams of case officers, interrogation experts, field analysts, linguists, technical specialists, and special operations forces.
- Defense Attache System (DAS): DAS represents the United States in defense and military-diplomatic relations with foreign governments worldwide. It also manages and conducts overt human intelligence collection activities. Defense Attaches serve from Defense Attache Offices (DAO) co-located at more than a hundred United States Embassies in foreign nations, represent the Secretary of Defense in diplomatic relations with foreign governments and militaries, and coordinate military activities with partner nations.
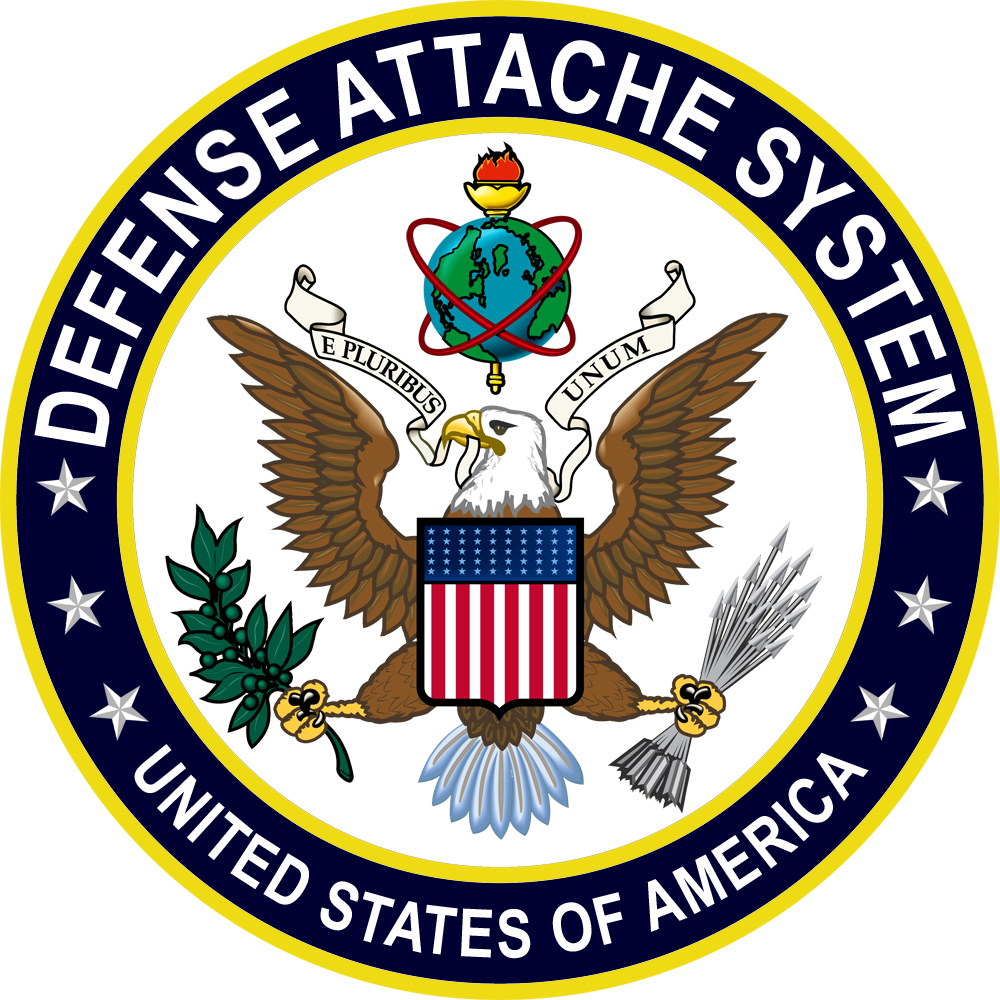
- Defense Cover Office (DCO): DCO is a DIA component responsible for executing cover programs for agency's intelligence officers, as well as those for the entire Department of Defense.

Directorate for Analysis: The Directorate of Analysis manages the all-source analysis elements of DIA, and is responsible for developing and deploying analytic tradecraft throughout the Defense Intelligence Enterprise. Analysts analyze and disseminate finalized intelligence products, focusing on national, strategic and operational-level military issues that may arise from worldwide political, economic, medical, natural or other related processes. Analysts contribute to the President's Daily Brief and the National Intelligence Estimates. Analysts serve DIA in all of the agency's facilities and DIA has the most forward deployed analysts in the Intelligence Community.

Directorate for Science and Technology: The Directorate for Science and Technology manages DIA's technical assets and personnel. These assets gather and analyze Measurement and Signature Intelligence, which is a technical intelligence discipline that serves to detect, track, identify or describe the signatures (distinctive characteristics) of fixed or dynamic target sources. This often includes radar intelligence, acoustic intelligence, nuclear intelligence, and chemical and biological intelligence. DIA is designated the national manager for MASINT collection within the United States Intelligence Community, coordinating all MASINT gathering across agencies. DIA is also the national manager of the Joint Worldwide Intelligence Communications System (JWICS), the central Top Secret/Sensitive Compartmented Information (TS/SCI) processing network for the United States, and Stone Ghost, a network for US and partner nations. In 2026 DIA created the National Digital Exploitation and Open-Source Center (NDOSC) by merging the National Media Exploitation Center and the Open-Source Intelligence Integration Center. The merger was driven in part by DoD/DoW workforce reductions.

Directorate for Mission Services: The Directorate for Mission Services provides administrative, technical, and programmatic support to the agency's domestic and global operations and analytic efforts. The Directorate also manages DIA's Academy for Defense Intelligence, the umbrella organization for DIA's professional training centers, including the Joint Military Intelligence Training Center and the Joint Military Attaché School. This includes providing counterintelligence to the agency as well as serving as the counterintelligence executive agent for the Department of Defense.

Centers: DIA is divided into five regional centers and two functional centers which manage the agency's efforts in these areas of responsibility. These centers are the Americas and Transnational Threats Center, the Indo-Pacific Regional Center, the Europe/Eurasia Regional Center, the Middle East/Africa Regional Center, the China Mission Group, the Defense Resources and Infrastructure Center, and the Defense Combating Terrorism Center. DIA also manages Community-wide centers such as the National Center for Medical Intelligence, the Missile and Space Intelligence Center, the National Media Exploitation Center, and the Underground Facilities Analysis Center (UFAC).

Further, DIA is responsible for administering the JIOCEUR and various Joint Intelligence Centers which serve and are co-located with each of the Unified Combatant Commands. Additionally, DIA manages the Directorate for Intelligence, Joint Staff (J2) which advises and supports the Joint Chiefs of Staff with foreign military intelligence for defense policy and war planning.

DIA also managed the National Intelligence University (NIU) on behalf of the Intelligence Community before transitioning it to the Office of the Director of National Intelligence (ODNI) in June 2021. NIU and the John T. Hughes Library is housed at the Intelligence Community campus in Bethesda, Maryland and has several branch campuses at RAF Molesworth, MacDill Air Force Base, and Marine Corps Base Quantico as well as academic programs at the NSA and NGA.

=== DIA Police ===
DIA has its own police force (established in 1963), made up of federal officers who protect DIA people and property. DIA Police provide law enforcement and police services, emergency response and physical security at DIA campuses.

DIA Police have 170 sworn, uniformed officers that protect and police the six DIA sites (Headquarters, Reston, Charlottesville, DIA Logistics Operation Center, National Center for Medical Intelligence and Missile and Space Intelligence Center).

==== Training ====
DIA Police Officers are trained at the Federal Law Enforcement Training Center for three months before being certified.

==== Authority ====
DIA Police operate under the U.S. Marshal's Office Special Deputation and jurisdictional and functional authority within the District of Columbia under a cooperative agreement with the Metropolitan Police Department of the District of Columbia.

==== Rank structure and organization ====
DIA Police have the following rank structure:

- Officer
- Special Agent (investigations)
- Sergeant
- Captain

DIA Police have K9, HAZMAT, SRT and also support DIA field operations.

== History ==
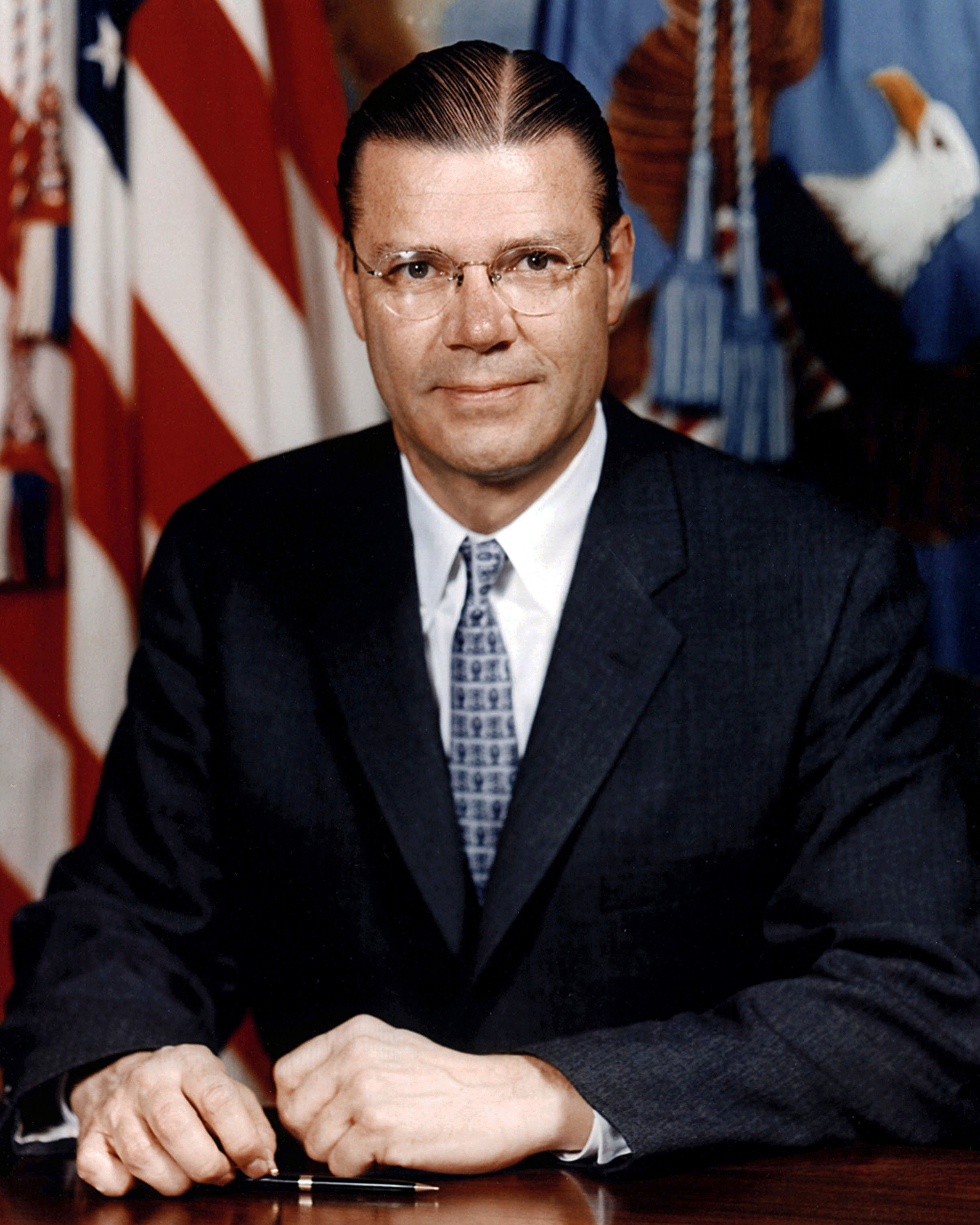
Robert McNamara, founder of DIA

From World War II until the creation of DIA in 1961, the three Military Departments collected, produced and distributed their intelligence for individual use. This turned out to be duplicative, costly, and ineffective as each department provided their own, often conflicting estimates to the Secretary of Defense and other Federal agencies.

While the Defense Reorganization Act of 1958 aimed to correct these deficiencies, the intelligence responsibilities remained unclear, the coordination was poor and the results fell short of national reliability and focus. As a result of this poor organization, President Dwight D. Eisenhower appointed the Joint Study Group in 1960 to find better ways for organizing the nation's military intelligence activities.

Acting on the recommendations of the Joint Study Group, Defense Secretary Robert S. McNamara advised the Joint Chiefs of Staff (JCS) of his decision to establish DIA in February 1961. He ordered them to develop a plan that would integrate all the military intelligence of the DoD, a move that met strong resistance from the service intelligence units, whose commanders viewed DIA as undesirable encroachment on their turf. Despite this resistance, during the spring and summer of 1961, as Cold War tensions flared over the Berlin Wall, Air Force Lieutenant General Joseph Carroll took the lead in planning and organizing this new agency. The JCS published Directive 5105.21, "Defense Intelligence Agency" on August 1, and DIA began operations with a handful of employees in borrowed office space on October 1, 1961.

The foundation of DIA institutionalized the revoking of the CIA's paramilitary and other duties, and their transfer to the Department of Defense. This revocation had occurred following the failure of the Bay of Pigs Invasion.

DIA originally reported to the Secretary through the JCS. The new agency's mission was the continuous task of collecting, processing, evaluating, analyzing, integrating, producing, and disseminating military intelligence for DoD and related national stakeholders. Other objectives included more efficiently allocating scarce intelligence resources, more effectively managing all DoD intelligence activities, and eliminating redundancies in facilities, organizations, and tasks.

=== DIA begins operation ===
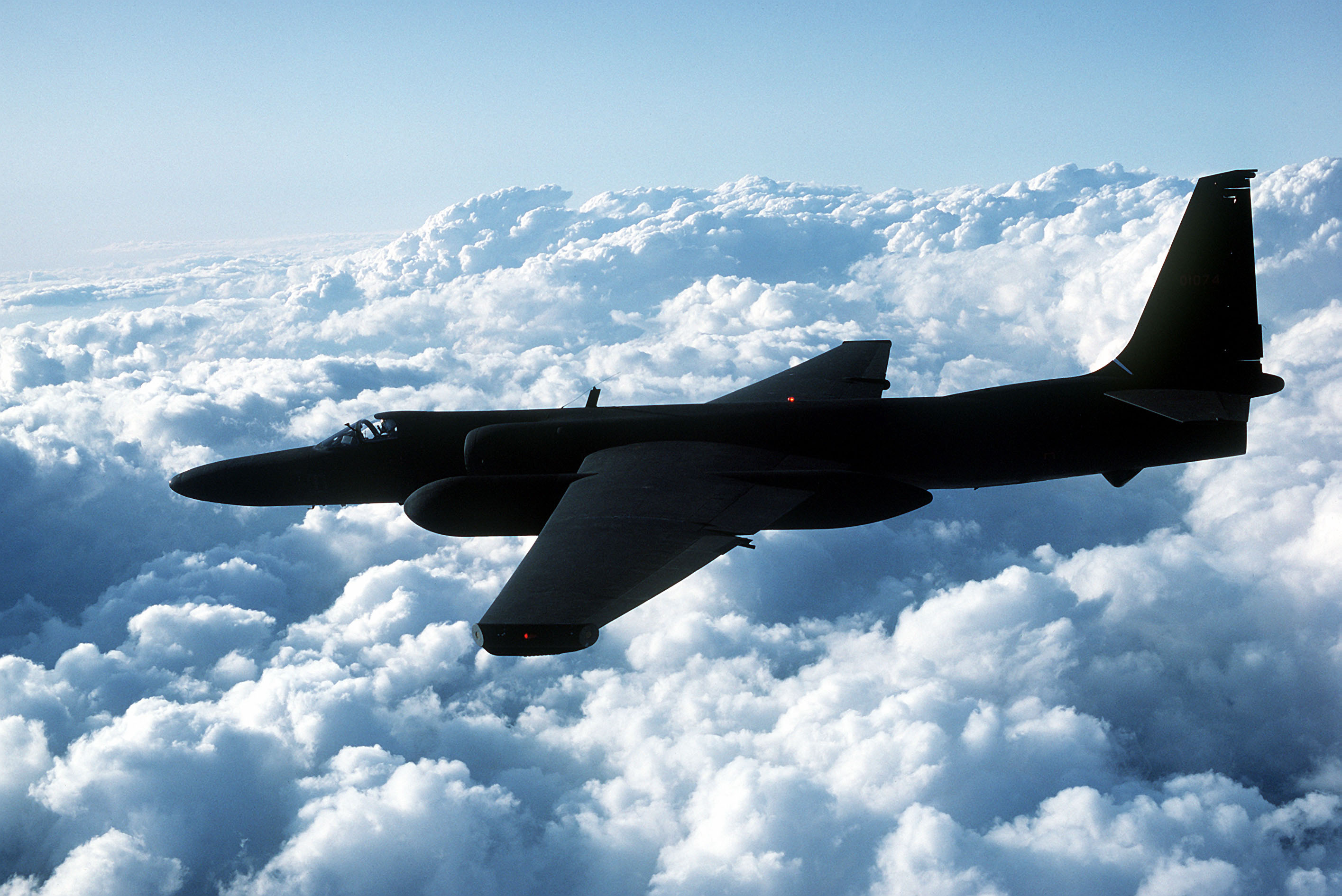
A U-2 reconnaissance plane discovered Soviet missiles in Cuba based on a flight path selected by DIA analysts.

Following DIA's establishment, the Services reluctantly transferred intelligence functions and resources to it on a time-phased basis to avoid rapidly degrading the overall effectiveness of defense intelligence. A year after its formation, in October 1962, the agency faced its first major intelligence test during the superpower Cuban Missile Crisis confrontation that developed after Soviet missiles were discovered at bases in Cuba by Air Force spy planes.

In late 1962, DIA established the Defense Intelligence School (now the National Intelligence University), and on January 1, 1963, it activated a new Production Center. Several Service elements were merged to form this production facility, which occupied the "A" and "B" Buildings at Arlington Hall Station, Virginia.

The agency also added an Automated Data Processing (ADP) Center on February 19, a Dissemination Center on March 31, and a Scientific and Technical Intelligence Directorate on April 30, 1963. DIA assumed the staff support functions of the J-2, Joint Staff, on July 1, 1963. Two years later, on July 1, 1965, DIA accepted responsibility for the Defense Attaché System—the last function the Services transferred to DIA.

During the 1960s, DIA analysts focused on China's detonation of an atomic bomb and the launching of its Cultural Revolution; increasing unrest among African and South Asian nations; fighting in Cyprus and Kashmir; and the missile gap between the U.S. and the Soviet Union. In the late 1960s, crises that tested intelligence responsiveness included: the Tet Offensive in Vietnam; the Six-Day War between Egypt and Israel; continuing troubles in Africa, particularly Nigeria; North Korea's seizure of the USS Pueblo; and the Warsaw Pact invasion of Czechoslovakia.

=== Years of transition ===
The early 1970s were transitional years as the agency shifted its focus from consolidating its functions to establishing itself as a credible producer of national-level intelligence. This proved difficult at first since sweeping manpower decrements between 1968 and 1975 had reduced agency manpower by 31 percent and precipitated mission reductions and a broad organizational restructuring. Challenges facing DIA at this time included the rise of Ostpolitik in Germany; the emergence of the Palestine Liberation Organization in the Middle East; and the U.S. incursion into Cambodia from South Vietnam.

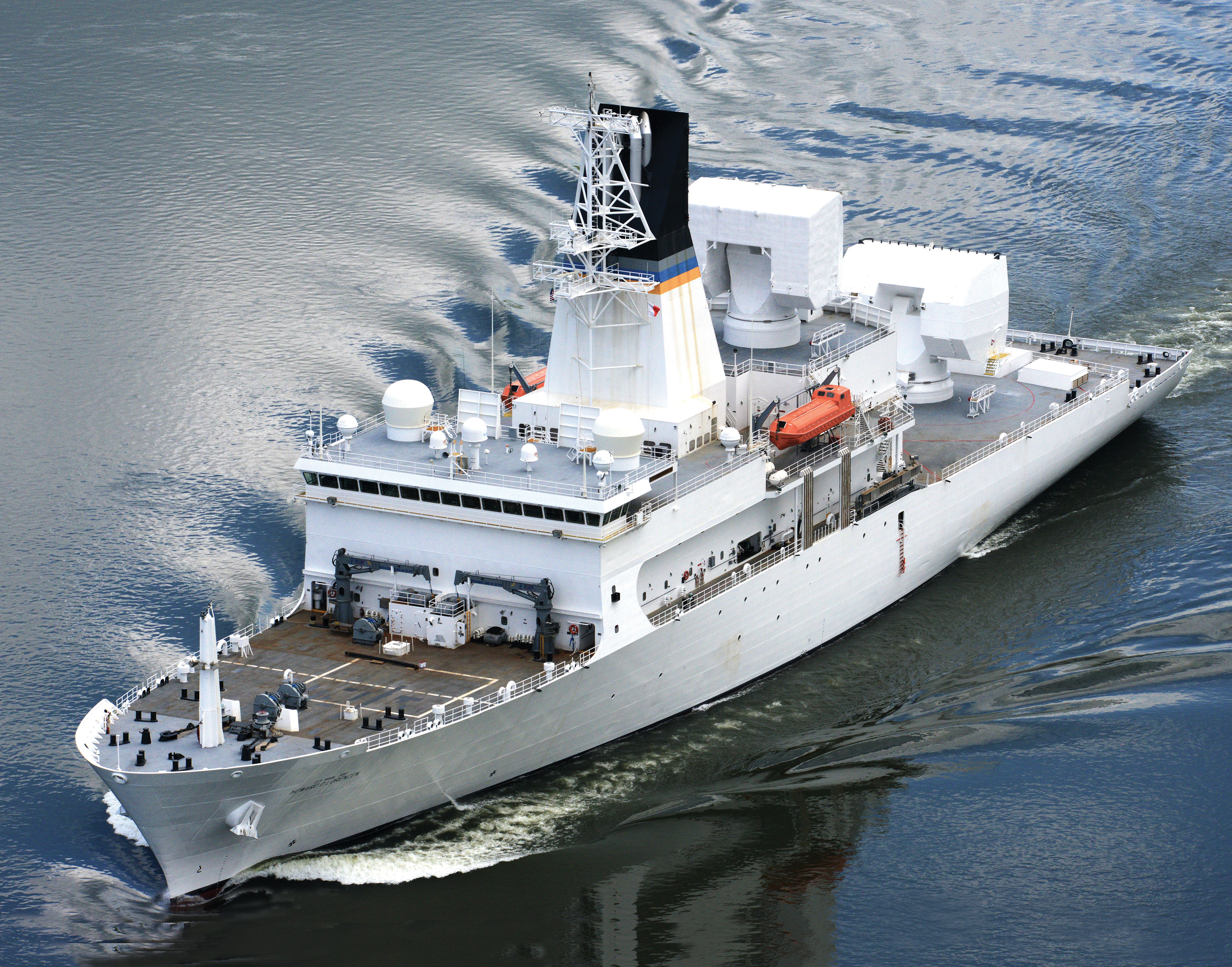
DIA sets intelligence requirements for numerous installations, such as the USNS Howard O. Lorenzen, which checks compliance with strategic arms treaties worldwide.

The agency's reputation grew considerably by the mid-1970s, as decision makers increasingly recognized the value of its products. Agency analysts in 1972 concentrated on Lebanon, President Richard Nixon's visit to China, the 1973 Chilean coup d'état, the formation of Sri Lanka, and the prisoners of war being held in Southeast Asia. Subsequent challenges involved: détente; the development of arms control agreements; the Paris peace talks (Vietnam); the Yom Kippur War; and global energy concerns.

Intense Congressional review during 1975–76 created turbulence within the Intelligence Community. The Murphy and Rockefeller Commission investigations of charges of intelligence abuse ultimately led to an Executive Order that modified many Intelligence Community functions. At the same time, with U.S. involvement in Vietnam ending, defense intelligence faced a significant decline in resources. During this period, DIA conducted numerous studies on ways of improving its intelligence products. Despite these and other Community-wide efforts to improve intelligence support, the loss of resources during the 1970s limited the Community's ability to collect and produce timely intelligence and ultimately contributed to intelligence shortcomings in Iran, Afghanistan, and other strategic areas.

Special DIA task forces were set up to monitor crises such as the Soviet invasion of Afghanistan, the overthrow of Iranian monarchy, and the taking of American hostages from the U.S. embassy in Tehran in 1979. Also, of serious concern were the Vietnamese takeover in Phnom Penh, the China–Vietnam border war, the overthrow of Idi Amin in Uganda, the north–south Yemen dispute, troubles in Pakistan, border clashes between Libya and Egypt, the Sandinista takeover in Nicaragua, and the Soviet movement of combat troops to Cuba during the signing of the Strategic Arms Limitation Treaty II.

Following the promulgation in 1979 of Executive Order 12036, which restructured the Intelligence Community and better outlined DIA's national and departmental responsibilities, the agency was reorganized around five major directorates: production, operations, resources, external affairs, and J-2 support.

=== 1980s ===
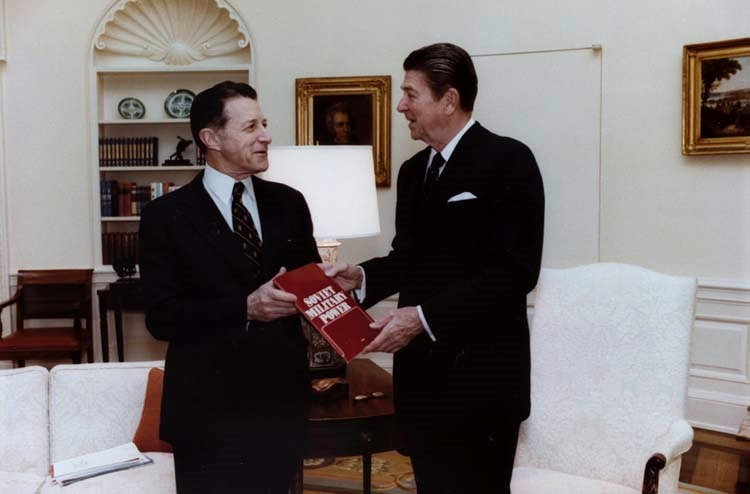
President Ronald Reagan unveiling the first copy of Soviet Military Power, one of DIA's serialized publications

By the 1980s, DIA had transformed into a fully integrated national-level intelligence agency. Its 1981 flagship publication Soviet Military Power, the most comprehensive overview of Soviet military strength and capabilities at the time, was met with wide acclaim; SMP continued to be produced by DIA as a serialized publication roughly over the next decade. In 1983, in order to research the flow of technology to the Soviet Union, the Reagan Administration created Project Socrates within the agency. Over the following years Project Socrates's scope broadened to include monitoring of foreign advanced technology as a whole. Project Socrates ended in 1990 with Michael Sekora, the project's director, leaving in protest when the Bush Administration reduced funding.

In 1984, the Clandestine Services organization, designated STAR WATCHER, was created under DIA with the mission of conducting intelligence collection on perceived areas of conflict and against potential adversaries in developing countries. A critical objective was to create a Joint Services career path for case officers, since individual Services were inconsistent in their support of clandestine operations, and case officers were routinely sacrificed during reductions in force. Ultimately, the organization was created to balance CIA's espionage operations which primarily targeted Soviet KGB/GRU officers, but ignored and were dismissive of Third World targets in areas of potential military conflict.

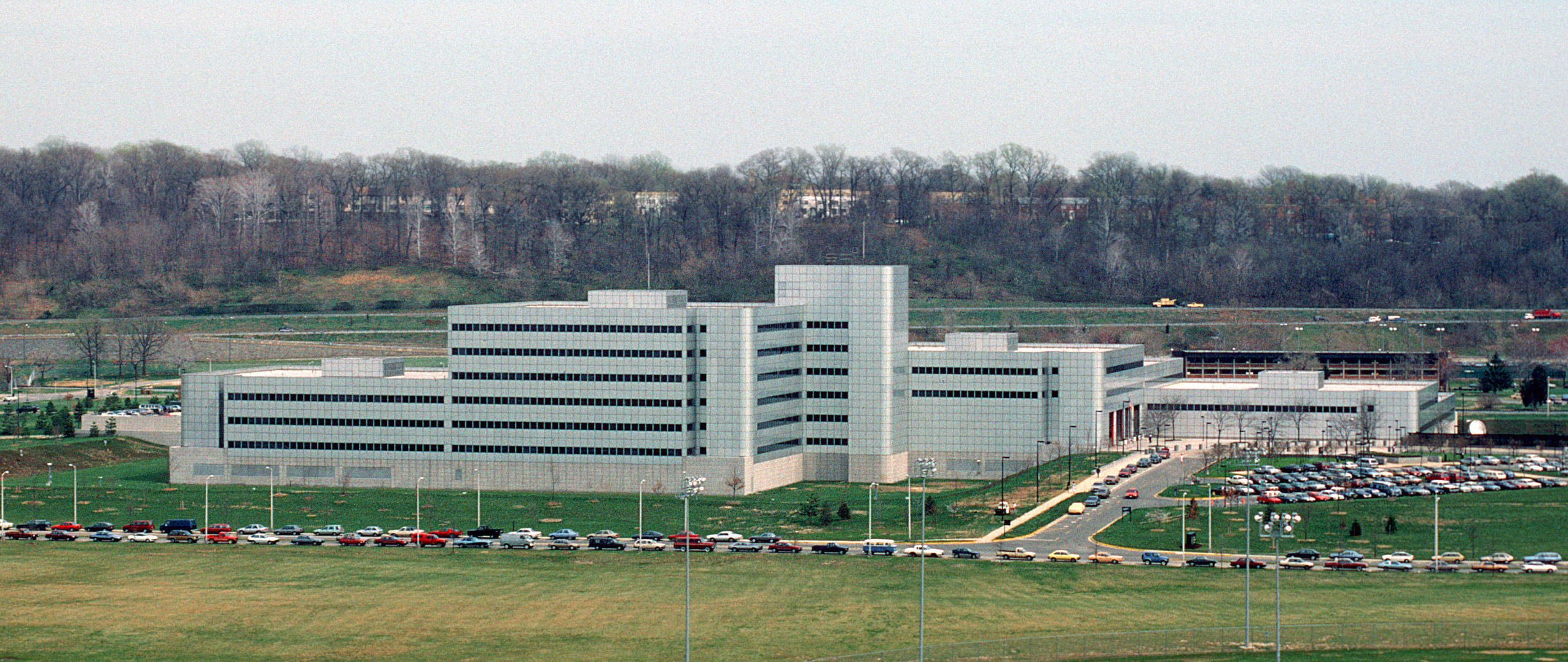
In the 1980s, DIA moved into the newly built Defense Intelligence Agency Headquarters (seen here in 1988), which now represents only one wing of the sprawling complex.

Although there were previous attempts to establish such a DoD level espionage organization, there was no authorization document by which it could be established. This changed when Gregory Davis, a military intelligence officer, defined and established a clandestine services program under the U.S. Southern Command's "Plan Green". The program was then authorized by JCS Chairman John Vessey, and sanctioned by the Senate Select Committee on Intelligence ("SSCI"), with the sponsorship of Senator Jesse Helms (R-NC) and Senator Barry Goldwater (R-AZ). The Goldwater–Nichols DoD Reorganization Act was crafted partly to force military officers to serve in a Joint Services assignment in order to qualify for flag rank—ensuring the future of case officers from each Service. The clandestine organization within DIA grew and flourished, and was cited by the SSCI for its intelligence achievements. Personnel selection and training were rigorous, and the case officers were notable for their advanced educations, area knowledge, and multilingual capabilities. The program was partially gutted under President Bill Clinton as he foresaw no conflict which would justify its existence, but, it was resurrected under President George W. Bush.

Designated a combat support agency under the Goldwater–Nichols Act, DIA moved to increase cooperation with the Unified & Specified Commands and to begin developing a body of joint intelligence doctrine. Intelligence support to U.S. allies in the Middle East intensified as the Iran–Iraq War spilled into the Persian Gulf. DIA provided significant intelligence support to Operation Earnest Will while closely monitoring incidents such as the Iraqi rocket attack on the USS Stark, the destruction of Iranian oil platforms, and Iranian attacks on Kuwaiti oil tankers. The "Toyota War" between Libya and Chad and the turmoil in Haiti added to DIA's heavy production workload, as did unrest in other parts of Latin America, Somalia, Ethiopia, Burma, Pakistan, and the Philippines.

=== Post–Cold War transformation ===
With the end of the Cold War, defense intelligence began a period of reevaluation following the fall of the Soviet system in many Eastern European countries, the reunification of Germany (1990), and ongoing economic reforms in the region. In response to Iraq's invasion of Kuwait in August 1990, DIA set up an extensive, 24-hour, crisis management cell designed to tailor national-level intelligence support to the coalition forces assembled to expel Iraq from Kuwait.

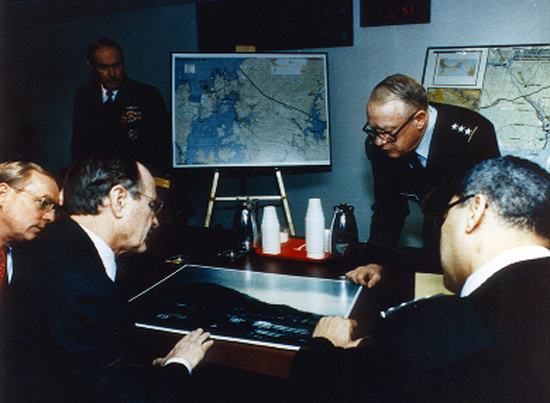
President George H. W. Bush being briefed by DIA during the US invasion of Panama

By the time Operation Desert Storm began, some 2,000 agency personnel were involved in the intelligence support effort. Most of them associated in some way with the national-level Joint Intelligence Center (JIC), which DIA established at The Pentagon to integrate the intelligence being produced throughout the Community. DIA sent more than 100 employees into the Kuwaiti Theater of Operations to provide intelligence support.

The Armed Forces Medical Intelligence Center (AFMIC), and the Missile and Space Intelligence Center (MSIC), associated with the Army for over 20 and 50 years respectively, became part of DIA in January 1992. This was part of the continuing effort to consolidate intelligence production and make it more efficient.

On September 11, 2001, seven DIA employees died along with 118 other victims at the Pentagon in a terrorist attack when American Airlines Flight 77 piloted by five Al-Qaeda hijackers plowed into the western side of the building, as part of the September 11 attacks. The death of seven employees at once was the largest combined loss in DIA's history. On September 11, 2009, DIA dedicated a memorial to the seven employees lost in the terrorist attacks on the Pentagon. The memorial is located in the garden at the DIA Analysis Center in Washington, D.C.

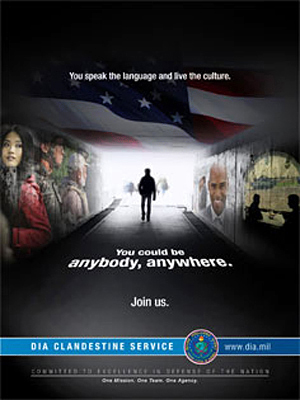
Defense Clandestine Service recruitment poster

Since the September 11 attacks, DIA has been active in nuclear proliferation intelligence collection and analysis with particular interests in North Korea and Iran as well as counter-terrorism. DIA was also involved with the intelligence build-up to the invasion of Iraq in 2003 and was a subject in the Senate Report of Pre-war Intelligence on Iraq. After the invasion, DIA led the Iraq Survey Group to find the alleged Weapons of Mass Destruction. The agency has conflicted with the CIA in collection and analysis on the existence of weapons of mass destruction in Iraq and has often represented the Pentagon in the CIA–DoD intelligence rivalry due to DIA's own Clandestine HUMINT collection.

In 2012, DIA announced an expansion of clandestine collection efforts. The newly consolidated Defense Clandestine Service (DCS) would absorb the Defense HUMINT Service and expand DIA's overseas espionage apparatus to complement the work of corresponding elements at CIA. DCS would focus on military intelligence concerns—issues that the CIA has been unable to manage due to lack of personnel, expertise or time—and would initially deal with Islamist militia groups in Africa, weapons transfers between North Korea and Iran, and Chinese military modernization. The DCS works in conjunction with CIA's Directorate of Operations and the Joint Special Operations Command in overseas operations.

In October 2015, the Pentagon said that DIA appointed a British Royal Air Force officer as its first deputy director in charge of improving integration between U.S. intelligence units and spy agencies of other English-speaking countries in the Five Eyes alliance. This was the first time that a foreign national was appointed to a senior position at a U.S. intelligence agency.

Today, corporations carry out a large amount of DIA's workload. In fiscal year 2020 alone, such activity included work in DIA's Science & Technology Directorate, National Media Exploitation Center, and Missile & Space Intelligence Center. Corporations also worked on technology transfer analysis and assessments at DIA's Charlottesville branch, planned and analyzed DIA's workforce, carried out technical support, and conducted polygraph examinations and background investigations.

== Employment requirements and polygraph ==
Department of Defense polygraph brochure distributed to applicants by DIA and NSA, among other intelligence components

Due to the sensitive nature of DIA's work, all of its personnel, including interns and contractors, are subject to the same security standards and must obtain a Top Secret clearance with Sensitive Compartmented Information (TS/SCI) access. Collateral Top Secret clearances granted by the DoD are not sufficient to grant access to DIA's SCI information. Additionally, the SCI access granted by other intelligence agencies, such as CIA or NSA, do not transfer to DIA and vice versa.

In addition to the rigorous background investigations, psychological and drug screening, as well as security interviews, DIA requires that its applicants pass the agency polygraph. In fact, DIA exercises operational control over the National Center for Credibility Assessment (NCCA), which establishes polygraphing standards and trains polygraphers for placement across the entire intelligence community. In 2008, the agency started expanding its polygraph program in an attempt to screen 5,700 prospective and current employees every year. This was a several fold increase from 2002 when, according to information provided to Congress, DIA conducted 1,345 polygraphs. According to the unclassified DIA document cited in the news report, since the mid-2000s the agency started hiring contract polygraphers in addition to the permanent DIA polygraphers and added 13 polygraphing studios to those the spy organization already operated. This expanded polygraph screening at DIA continued notwithstanding documented technical problems discovered in the Lafayette computerized polygraph system used by the agency; the organization allegedly refused to change the flawed Lafayette polygraph but declined to comment as to the reasoning.

Unlike the CIA and NSA polygraphs, DIA polygraphs are only of Counterintelligence Scope (CI), rather than Full Scope (FS) (also known as Expanded Scope Screening or ESS), which is ostensibly more intrusive as far as one's personal life is concerned. DIA administered only a handful of FS polygraphs and only for those personnel who were to be detailed to the CIA. Additionally, DIA conducted a handful of FS polygraphs on its personnel remaining overseas in excess of 6.5 years, although this practice appeared to be outside the scope of DIA's authorization at the time.

Like with other intelligence agencies, failing to pass the DIA polygraph is a virtual guarantee that an applicant will be judged unsuitable for agency employment. In fact, according to a report published by the Office of the Undersecretary of Defense of Intelligence, while the usually more stringent NSA is willing to give its applicants several shots at passing the polygraph, DIA tends to give one or at most two opportunities to clear the test, after which the employment offer is rescinded. The same report recommended that DIA seek permanent authority to conduct more intrusive Expanded Scope Screenings due to their supposed usefulness in eliciting admissions from applicants.

Similarly to other intelligence agencies, employees are required to take periodic polygraph examinations throughout their careers. However, no unfavorable administrative actions will be taken against them based solely on their results.

== Budget and personnel ==
DIA's budget and exact personnel numbers are classified. Classified Information is not willingly revealed to the public or with anyone that does not have a need-to-know verified. The agency does reveal that currently, it has approximately 17,000 employees, two-thirds of whom are civilians and approximately 50% of whom work at more than 141 overseas locations. In 1994, it was revealed that DIA requested approximately $4 billion in funding for the period of 1996–2001 ($6.3 billion inflation adjusted), averaging $666 million per year ($1.05 billion inflation adjusted). The agency, however, has nearly doubled in size since then and also assumed additional responsibilities from various intelligence elements from across the Department of Defense, CIA and wider intelligence community. In 2006, at the height of Donald Rumsfeld's push to further expand the scope of military intelligence beyond tactical considerations, DIA was estimated to receive up to $3 billion annually.

According to classified documents leaked by Edward Snowden and published by The Washington Post in 2013, the National Intelligence Program (NIP) component of the overall US intelligence budget contained approximately $4.4 billion/year for the General Defense Intelligence Program (GDIP), which is managed by DIA, even as it is not exclusively for the agency's use. The numbers exclude the Military Intelligence Component (MIP) of the overall US intelligence budget, which by itself has averaged more than $20 billion per year in the past decade.

== Notable cases of espionage ==
DIA is one of a few U.S. federal organizations, such as the CIA and FBI, that rely on human espionage to collect information. For this reason, the agency has been involved in numerous espionage events over the course of decades.

=== Spying for DIA ===
- Victor Kaliadin (Russian: Виктор Калядин) – a CEO of a Russian company "Elers Electron", who in 2001 was sentenced to 14 years in prison for selling a ring run by a DIA agent technical information on Arena, the Russian active protection system for tanks. He died of his fourth heart attack in 2004.

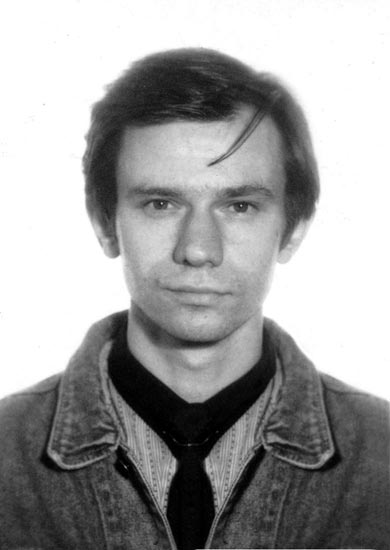
Igor Sutyagin

- Igor Sutyagin – Russian arms control and nuclear weapons specialist convicted in 2004 of spying for DIA. Released in 2010 in exchange for Russian spies arrested in the U.S. during the break-up of the Illegals Program. Denies any involvement in spying.
- Edmond Pope – A retired intelligence officer-turned-"businessman", sentenced by a Russian court in 2000 to 20 years for buying up and smuggling classified military equipment out of the country as scrap metal. He was soon pardoned by newly elected Vladimir Putin but continues to assert that the Russian authorities used him as a scapegoat for their broken system. In the same interview with Larry King, however, he spoke of a plot by unspecified people in the U.S., as part of which Pope was being slowly poisoned in the Lefortovo Prison, with the hopes that he would eventually have to be transferred to a hospital, abducted on his way and smuggled out of the country; he claims that his representatives stopped the plot.
- Jerzy Strawa – a Polish engineer and an employee of the Ministry of Foreign Trade executed in 1968 at Mokotów Prison for passing industrial and defense information to DIA agents while on official trips in Austria and West Germany.
- Natan Sharansky – a former high ranking Israeli politician and Soviet dissident who, during his life in Russia, was sentenced to 13 years of prison with hard labor for spying for DIA. The prosecution alleged that he gave a DIA agent in journalist's disguise—Robert Toth—a list of people who had access to military and other secrets. Sharansky was released in 1986 following a spy exchange that took place on the Glienicke Bridge between the USSR and the Western allies. In 2006, he was awarded the Presidential Medal of Freedom.
- Charles Dennis McKee – a DIA officer who, along with CIA's Matthew Gannon, died as a result of the Pan Am Flight 103 bombing. The incident produced numerous conspiracy theories that the flight was bombed because the officers were aware of illicit U.S. intelligence drug activities or that the case was related to them trying to secure the release of American hostages in Lebanon. He is notably absent from DIA's memorial wall (below)

=== Spying against DIA ===
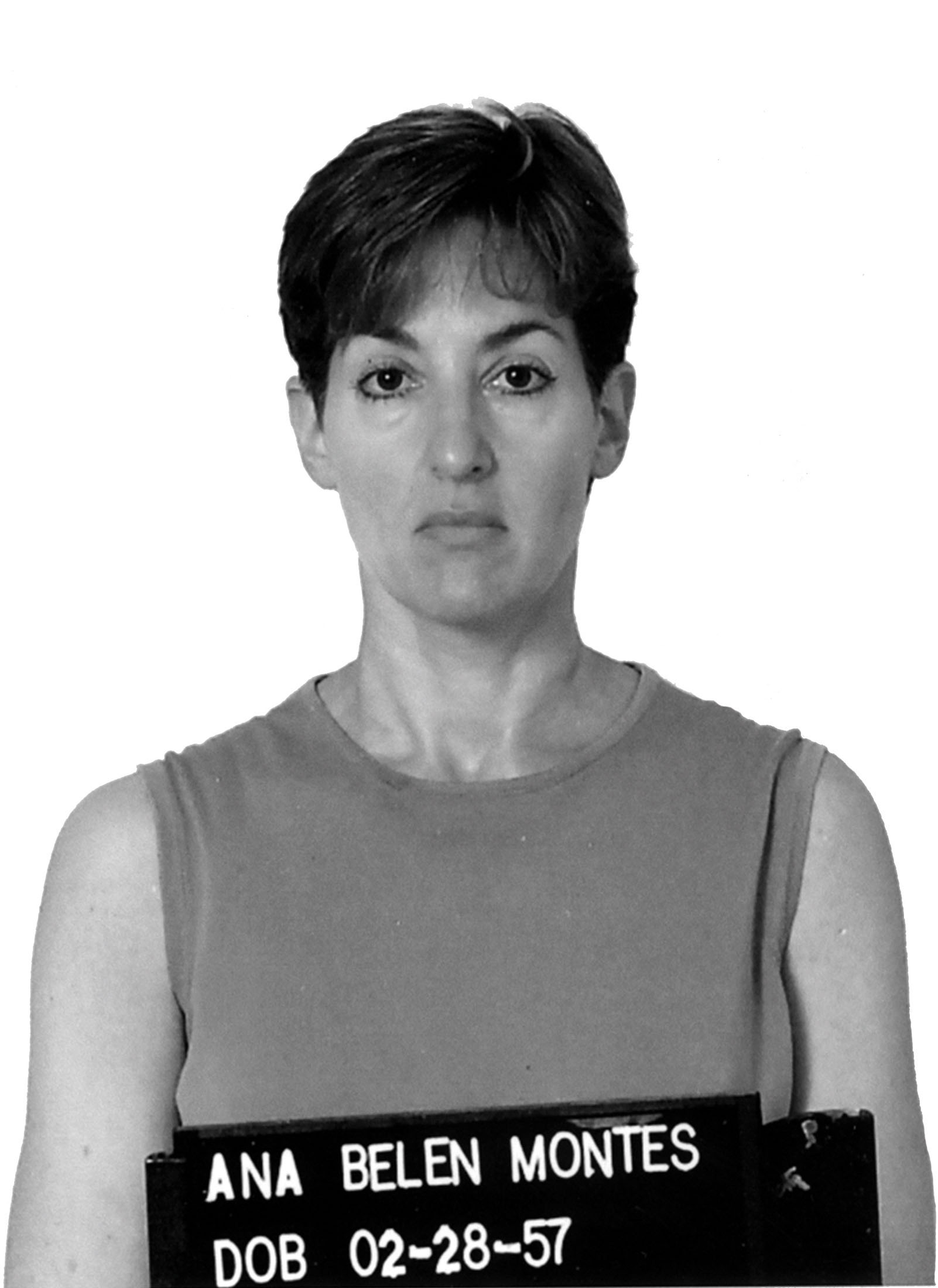
Ana Montes

- Ana Belén Montes – a senior DIA analyst arrested in 2001 for spying for the G2 of Cuba and sentenced to 25 years in prison. Prosecutors alleged that she started spying in the mid-1980s, around the same time when CIA's Aldrich Ames started his interaction with the KGB.
- Ronald Montaperto – a senior DIA intelligence analyst who pleaded guilty in 2006 for giving classified information to China's MSS. Montaperto claimed that he was tricked and served only three months in jail due to letters of support from other pro-China intelligence analysts, pejoratively known as the "Red Team", who "harshly [criticize] anyone who raises questions about the threat posed by Beijing's communist regime." One of such supporters, Lonnie Henley, was initially reprimanded by the ODNI for his support of Montaperto but was later promoted to acting national intelligence officer for East Asia.
- Waldo H. Dubberstein – a senior DIA intelligence officer for the Middle East and an associate of CIA arms smuggler Edwin P. Wilson who was indicted in 1983 for selling DIA secrets to Libya. The day after being charged, he was found dead in what was ruled a suicide.

== Controversies ==
=== Alleged torture with drugs, gay porn, and loud music ===
A declassified FBI correspondence alleging DIA misconduct

In 2003, the Defense Secretary Donald Rumsfeld's "Working Group" on interrogations requested that DIA come up with prisoner interrogation techniques for the group's consideration. According to the 2008 US Senate Armed Services Committee report on the treatment of detainees in U.S. custody, DIA began drawing up the list of techniques with the help of its civilian employee, a former Guantanamo Interrogation Control Element (ICE) Chief David Becker. Becker claimed that the Working Group members were particularly interested in aggressive methods and that he "was encouraged to talk about techniques that inflict pain."

It is unknown to what extent the agency's recommendations were used or for how long, but according to the same Senate report, the list drawn up by DIA included the use of "drugs such as sodium pentothal and Demerol," humiliation via female interrogators and sleep deprivation. Becker claimed that he recommended the use of drugs due to rumors that another intelligence agency, the name of which was redacted in the Senate report, had successfully used them in the past. According to the analysis of the Office of Defense Inspector General, DIA's cited justification for the use of drugs was to "[relax] detainee to cooperative state" and that mind-altering substances were not used.

Some of the more lurid revelations of DIA's alleged harsh interrogations came from FBI officers, who conducted their own screenings of detainees in Guantanamo along with other agencies. According to one account, the interrogators of what was then DIA's Defense Humint Service (referenced in FBI correspondence as DHS), forced subjects to watch gay porn, draped them with the Israeli flag, and interrogated them in rooms lit by strobe lights for 16–18 hours, all the while telling prisoners that they were from FBI.

The real FBI operatives were concerned that DIA's harsh methods and impersonation of FBI agents would complicate the FBI's ability to do its job properly, saying "The next time a real Agent tries to talk to that guy, you can imagine the result." A subsequent military inquiry countered FBI's allegations by saying that the prisoner treatment was degrading but not inhumane, without addressing the allegation of DIA staff regularly impersonating FBI officers—usually a felony offense.

Similar activities transpired at the hands of DIA operatives in Bagram, where as recently as 2010 the organization ran the so-called "Black Jail". According to a report published by The Atlantic, the jail was manned by DIA's DCHC staff, who were accused of beating and sexually humiliating high-value targets held at the site. The detention center outlived the black sites run by the Central Intelligence Agency, with DIA allegedly continuing to use "restricted" interrogation methods in the facility under a secret authorization. It is unclear what happened to the secret facility after the 2013 transfer of the base to Afghan authorities following several postponements.

DIA's harsh interrogation methods at times paled in comparison to those of some U.S. special operations forces. In 2004, interrogations by Joint Special Operations Command's high-value targets special operations task forces (including Task Force 6-26) were so heavy-handed and physical with the detainees that two DIA officials complained, as a result of which they were threatened and put under surveillance by abusive military interrogators. The two DIA officials managed to share their accounts of abuse with the agency leadership, prompting DIA Director Lowell Jacoby to write a memo on this topic to the Undersecretary of Defense for Intelligence.

=== Skinny Puppy controversy ===
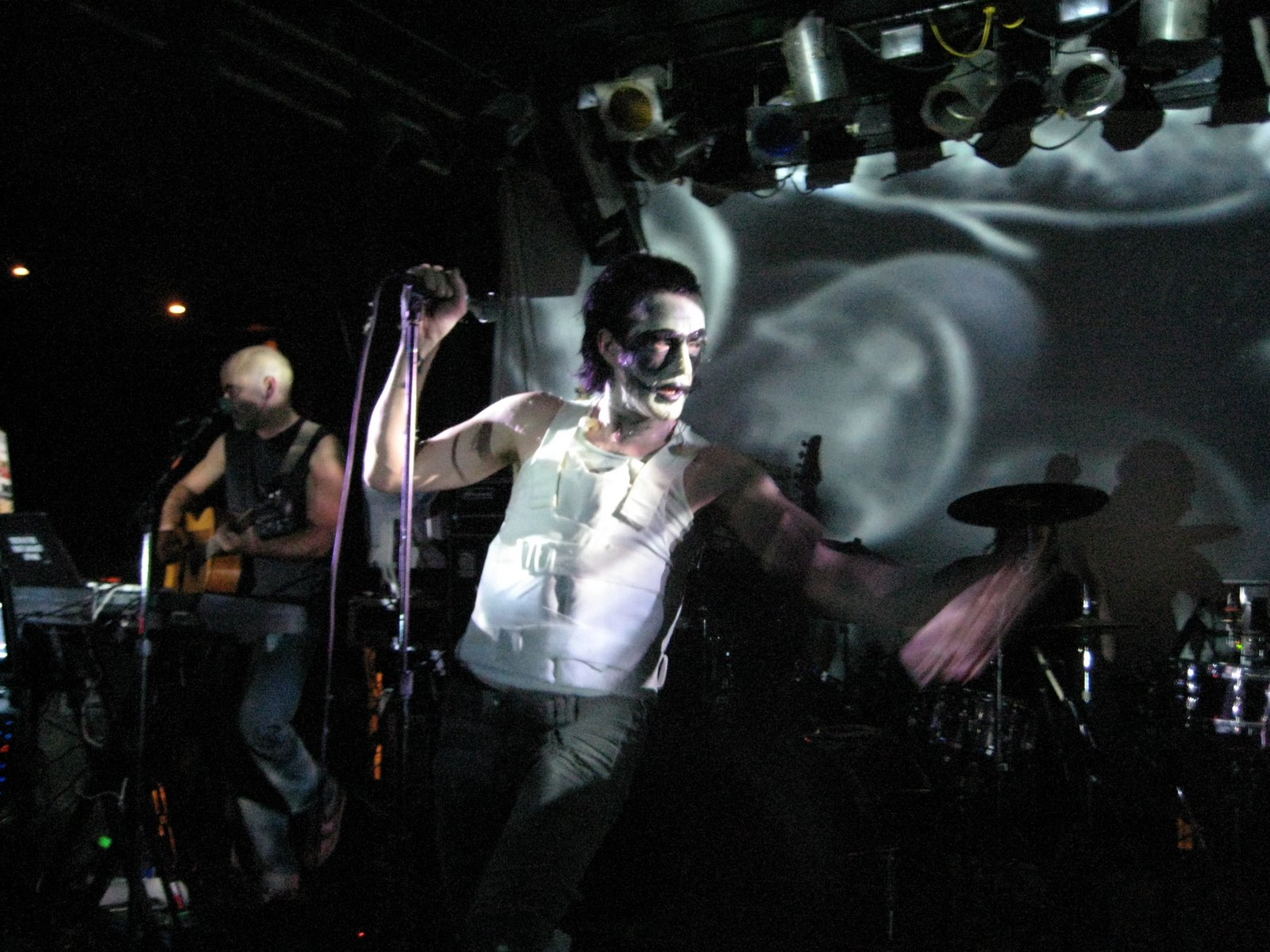
Skinny Puppy billed DIA for allegedly using its music in torture.

In 2014, Canadian electronic music group Skinny Puppy sent the Defense Intelligence Agency a symbolic bill of $666,000, after finding out that the agency used their music in Guantanamo during "enhanced interrogation" (deemed torture by some) sessions. Their music was originally heard at GTMO by a guard, who happened to be a fan of Skinny Puppy and could not understand how his favorite music was being used in such a manner: "[Skinny Puppy's] songs are characterized by ... lyrics that call out corporate wrongdoing. The songs I heard at GTMO were heavily distorted, almost to the point of inaudibility. Even so, I would never have imagined that Skinny Puppy's music would, or could, be used for enhanced interrogation". The officer conducting interrogation sessions allegedly stating that the Canadian group's songs—which are "characterized by relentless drumbeats, panicked, convulsive riffs, synth samples"—were very effective for "enhanced interrogation."

=== Attempts to expand domestic activities ===
Since mid-2000s, DIA has come under scrutiny for requesting new powers "to covertly approach and cultivate 'U.S. persons' and even recruit them as informants" without disclosing they are doing so on behalf of the U.S. government. George Peirce, DIA's general counsel, told The Washington Post that his agency is "not asking for the moon" and that DIA officers "only want to assess their [individual U.S. citizens'] suitability as a source, person to person", while protecting the ID and security of the agency operatives. The provision allowing DIA to covertly approach U.S. citizens was reportedly removed from the bill at the request of Senator Ron Wyden. It is unclear if the agency has received any additional powers since but it is known that until at least 2005 and possibly later, DIA's "personnel stationed in major U.S. cities [have been] ... monitoring the movements and activities—through high-tech equipment—of individuals and vehicles"; this occurred parallel to the NSA's warrantless surveillance that was of similarly dubious legality.

In 2008, with the consolidation of the new Defense Counterintelligence and Human Intelligence Center (DCHC), DIA secured an additional authority to conduct "offensive counterintelligence", which entails conducting clandestine operations, domestically and abroad, "to thwart what the opposition is trying to do to us and to learn more about what they're trying to get from us." While the agency remained vague about the exact meaning of offensive counterintelligence, experts opined that it "could include planting a mole in a foreign intelligence service, passing disinformation to mislead the other side, or even disrupting enemy information systems", suggesting strong overlap between CI and traditional HUMINT operations.

According to the agency, Americans spying for a foreign intelligence service would not be covered under this mechanism and that DIA would coordinate in such cases with the FBI which, unlike any DIA components at the time, is designated a law enforcement agency. The media showed particular interest in the domestic aspect of DIA's counterintelligence efforts due to the fact that agency's newly created DCHC had absorbed the former Counterintelligence Field Activity, which had become infamous for storing data on American peace activists in the controversial TALON database that was eventually shut down.

=== 9/11 and Able Danger ===
Anthony Shaffer, a former DIA officer, has claimed that DIA was aware of and failed to adequately act against one of the organizers of the September 11 attacks prior to the event, in what became known as the Able Danger controversy. Shaffer's claims were rejected and later his security clearance was revoked, with the Pentagon denying any wrongdoing. Later Shaffer published his book Operation Dark Heart but, upon complaints from DIA and NSA that it included national security information, the Defense Department went as far as to buy and destroy the initial 10,000 copies of the book, causing the Streisand effect.

=== German Neo-Nazi murders ===
In 2011, the German government uncovered a far-right terrorist group named National Socialist Underground, which was linked to a series of murders, including the murder of a police officer. A report by Stern claimed German BfV and DIA officers witnessed the murder of a policewoman during their surveillance of the "Sauerland" group—an Islamist organization that planned attacks on U.S. military installations in Germany—but that neither of the agencies reported it, thus enabling subsequent violent acts by the same criminal entities. The magazine cited an unverified DIA report that confirmed the agency's officers were at the site of the incident. The authenticity of the alleged DIA observation protocol, on which Stern based its report, was swiftly denied by the BfV, while DIA refused to comment. An unnamed U.S. "insider expert" for intelligence matters told Der Spiegel he deemed it unlikely that DIA could be involved in that type of operation.

=== Buying data without a warrant ===
According to Representative Ron Wyden, publicly available government contracts show DIA along with U.S. Cyber Command, the Army, the Naval Criminal Investigative Service, the Defense Counterintelligence and Security Agency, the FBI and the US Secret Service have purchased data without a warrant.

== Memorial wall ==
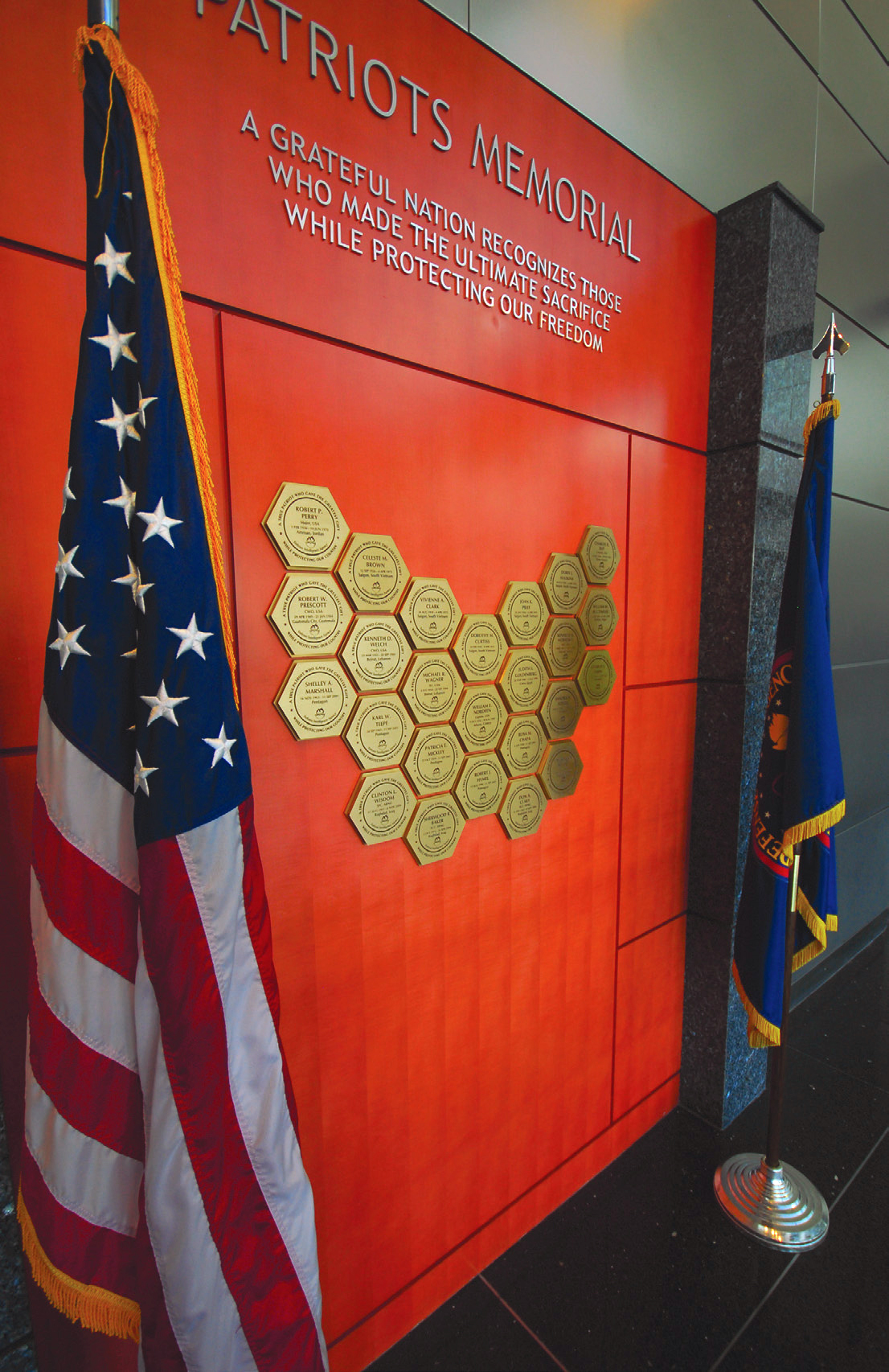
DIA's memorial wall

A memorial wall at the DIA headquarters is dedicated to those agency employees who lost their lives in the line of their intelligence work and whose deaths are not classified. The wall was first dedicated on December 14, 1988, by Director Leonard Perroots. It "commemorates the profound individual sacrifices made on behalf of the United States by DIA members and acts as a reminder of the selflessness, dedication, and courage required to confront national challenges..."

"POOR IS THE NATION THAT HAS NO HEROES, BUT BEGGARED IS THE NATION THAT HAS AND FORGETS THEM."

DIA also maintains a memorial in the headquarters courtyard dedicated to personnel lost in the attacks of 9/11 on the Pentagon. Additionally, the agency maintains the Torch Bearers Wall at its Headquarters. The Torch Bearers award is the highest honor bestowed to former DIA employees and recognizes their exceptional contributions to the agency's mission.

== Seal ==

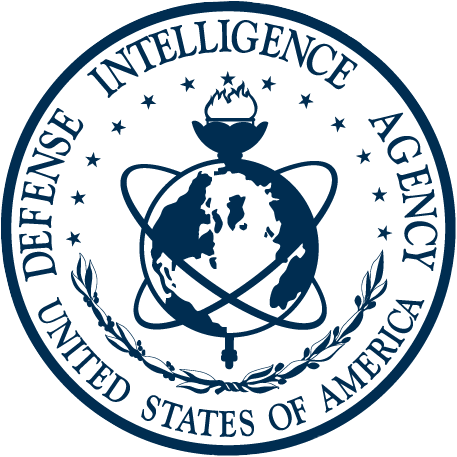

The flaming torch and its gold color represent knowledge, i.e., intelligence, and the dark background represents the unknown—"the area of the truth" still sought by the worldwide mission of the agency. The two red atomic ellipses symbolize the scientific and technical aspects of intelligence today and of the future. The 13 stars and the wreath are adopted from the Department of Defense seal and mean glory and peace, respectively, which the DoD secures as part of its work.

== Badge ==
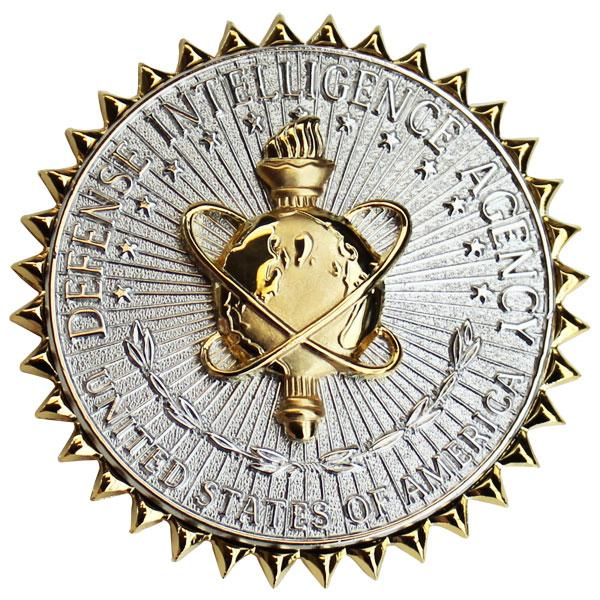
Defense Intelligence Agency Badge

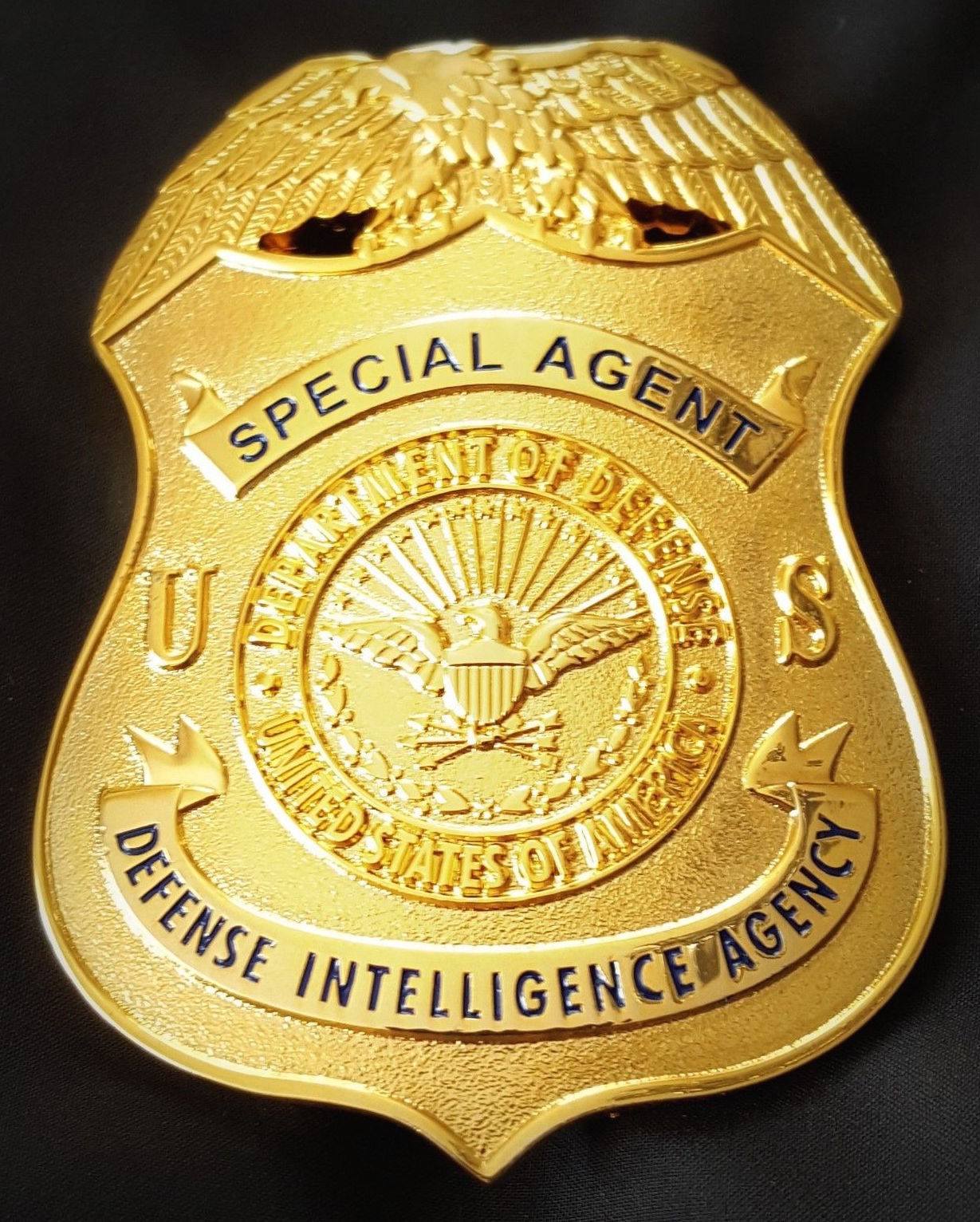
Defense Intelligence Agency Special Agent Badge

== Media Portrayal ==
Less known than its civilian equivalent or its cryptologic counterpart, DIA and its personnel have at times been portrayed in works of American popular culture. DIA's parent organization, the Department of Defense, features in fiction and media much more prominently due to the public's greater awareness of its existence and the general association of military organizations with warfare, rather than spycraft.

A prominent example is NBC's The Brave (2017–2018), an action drama built around a DIA-led covert team. The series centers on Deputy Director Patricia Campbell, played by Anne Heche, and Captain Adam Dalton, played by Mike Vogel, as they direct and execute dangerous overseas missions with intelligence support from Washington. Unlike many espionage dramas that blur agency identities, The Brave explicitly presents its command element as part of the Defense Intelligence Agency and depicts the agency as a hub that combines analysis, surveillance, and military tasking in real time.

Another recurring DIA portrayal appears in CBS's Madam Secretary. In the series, Jane Fellows, portrayed by Jill Hennessy, is introduced as a Defense Intelligence Agency handler and senior intelligence official tied to covert and human-intelligence operations. The role places the DIA inside the show's broader foreign-policy and national-security plotlines, using the agency as a vehicle for military intelligence, clandestine liaison work, and strategic advising rather than conventional law enforcement or diplomatic activity.

As with other U.S. foreign intelligence organizations, the agency's role has occasionally been confused with those of law enforcement agencies.

== See also ==
- Central Intelligence Agency
- National Security Agency
- Director of National Intelligence
- GRU
- Indonesian Strategic Intelligence Agency
- Coast Guard Intelligence Center
- Defense Attaché System
- JFCC ISR (US Strategic Command)
- Marine Corps Intelligence Activity
- Missile and Space Intelligence Center
- National Intelligence University
- Office of Naval Intelligence
- Strategic Support Branch
- G-2 (intelligence)
- UK Defence Intelligence
- Defence Intelligence Organisation (Australia)
