= Defense Intelligence Agency Headquarters =

Headquarters of the Defense Intelligence Agency in the USA

- Joint Base Anacostia–Bolling, Washington, DC
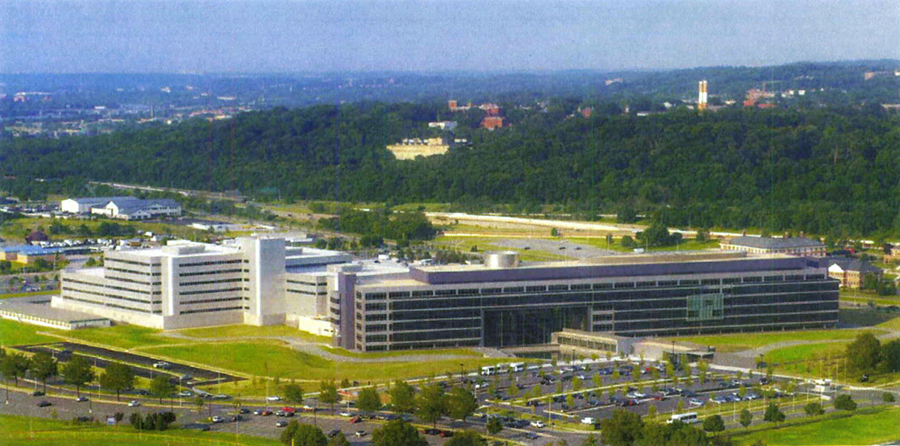

Site information
- Type: Headquarters
- Owner: Defense Intelligence Agency
- Controlled by: Director of the Defense Intelligence Agency
- Open to the public: No
- Condition: In Service

Location
- Shown on map of Washington, DC
- Location within the District of Columbia
- Coordinates: 38°50′53″N 77°00′44″W
- Height: Six stories above ground

The Defense Intelligence Agency Headquarters (DIA HQ) is the main command center of the Defense Intelligence Agency. It is located on the premises of Joint Base Anacostia–Bolling in Washington, D.C.

== Overview ==
DIA Headquarters (sometimes called the Defense Intelligence Analysis Center or DIAC) opened in 1983 and became operational in 1984. and designed by SmithGroupJJR to consolidate DIA activities in the Washington, D.C., area. In 2005, the agency opened the Headquarters Expansion, also designed by SmithGroupJJR, which allowed for more DIA personnel to serve under one roof than ever before. It simultaneously housed the Office of the Director of National Intelligence from 2005 until 2008, when the DNI's own facility was opened at Liberty Crossing in McLean, Virginia.

Under DIA HQ is also the headquarters of the co-located United States Strategic Command's Joint Functional Component Command for Intelligence, Surveillance and Reconnaissance (JFCC-ISR). DIA HQ also includes the DIA Memorial Wall, which commemorates 21 Defense Intelligence Agency employees who have died in the service of the agency and of the United States. Additionally, the facility houses a memorial honoring seven employees who died in the attacks of September 11, 2001, at the Pentagon, the Torch Bearers Wall, which recognizes employees' exceptional contributions to the agency’s mission, and the DIA Museum, which chronicles the history of the agency along with associated historical artifacts.

Currently, approximately 30% of DIA's workforce serves in the Headquarters.

In addition to DIA Headquarters, agency employees may also be detailed to US embassies as part of the Defense Attaché System, Ft. Detrick (Frederick, MD) for NCMI, Redstone Arsenal (Huntsville, AL) for MSIC, military combatant command headquarters, and several other locations.

== See also ==
- George Bush Center for Intelligence
- Defense Clandestine Service
