= Soviet Military Power =

United States public diplomacy publication

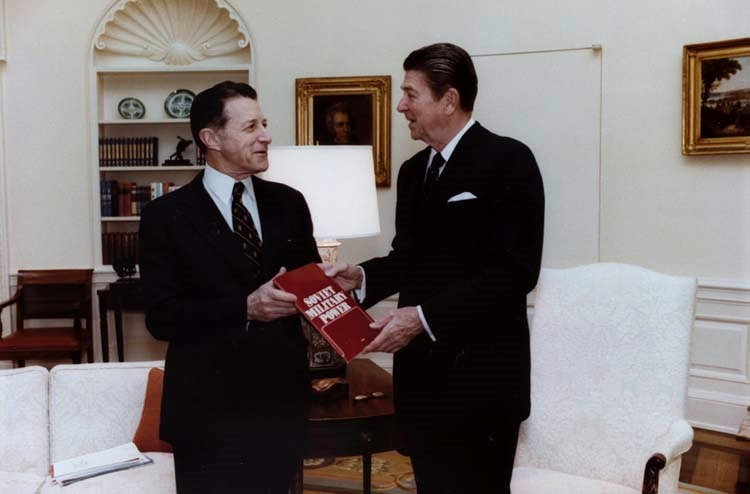
US Secretary of Defense Caspar Weinberger presenting President Ronald Reagan with the first copy of Soviet Military Power

Soviet Military Power was a public diplomacy publication of the US Defense Intelligence Agency (DIA), which provided an estimate of the military strategy and capabilities of the Soviet Union during the final years of the Cold War, ostensibly to alert the US public to the significant military capabilities of the Soviet Armed Forces. First published in early October 1981, it became an annual publication from 1983 until the collapse of the Soviet Union in 1991. Already in draft as the Soviet Union collapsed, the 1991 version was retitled "Military Forces in Transition". In addition to the majority English version, Soviet Military Power was translated, printed, and disseminated in a variety of languages, including German, French, Japanese, Italian, and Spanish.

The series has been continued by DIA as Russia Military Power.

== Overview ==
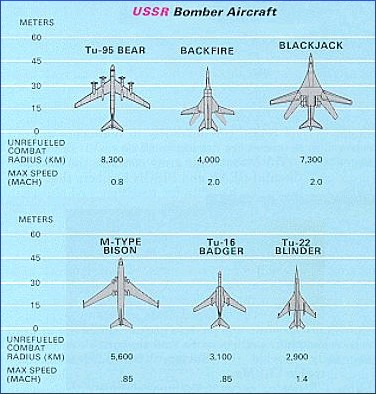
A comparison of Soviet Strategic Aviation aircraft from the publication

The report was produced annually by intelligence analysts and subject matter experts at DIA, incorporating all sources of intelligence from across the US Intelligence Community. By direction, draft inputs were written at a classified level prior to being edited or downgraded by senior intelligence officers with the proper authorities. To illustrate the publication without revealing classified US satellite imagery and sensor capabilities, DIA artists prepared approximately 150 detailed paintings of Soviet military hardware and installations specifically for the publication. Some of this original artwork is on display in the fourth-floor museum area of the Defense Intelligence Agency Headquarters at Joint Base Anacostia–Bolling in Washington, D.C.

Printing of the 100-page thick Soviet Military Power was traditionally handled by the Government Printing Office; the 1981 edition's run numbered 36,000 copies, printed at a cost of $40,000. The booklets were widely distributed within the government and press, and could also be purchased by the general public at local United States Post Offices (in 1981, for $6.50 [equivalent to $22 today]). At the time of initial publication, Soviet Military Power constituted the largest release of declassified data in Pentagon history.

According to US Secretary of Defense Caspar Weinberger, Soviet Military Power did not constitute any form of propaganda aimed at supporting the increasing defense budgets of the Reagan Administration but was designed instead to alert the US public to a growing imbalance between the military capabilities of the United States and the Soviet Union. However, a 2016 publication in The National Interest asserts that this publication was largely a propaganda effort aiming at justifying the then-US defense buildup through an exaggerated presentation of the Soviet Union's military power.

The first volume triggered an immediate response from the Soviet Union in the form of two countering propaganda documents Whence the Threat to Peace and Disarmament: Who's Against? published by the Soviet Union's Ministry of Defense.

== Publications ==
=== Soviet Military Power ===
- Soviet Military Power, 1981; alternate
- Soviet Military Power, 1983; alternate
- Soviet Military Power, 1984; alternate
- Soviet Military Power, 1985
- Soviet Military Power, 1986
- Soviet Military Power, 1987; alternate
- Soviet Military Power, 1988
- Soviet Military Power: Prospects for Change, 1989
- Soviet Military Power, 1990
- Military Forces in Transition, 1991

=== Russia Military Power ===
- Russia Military Power, 2017
