= John T. Hughes (intelligence officer) =

Intelligence officer

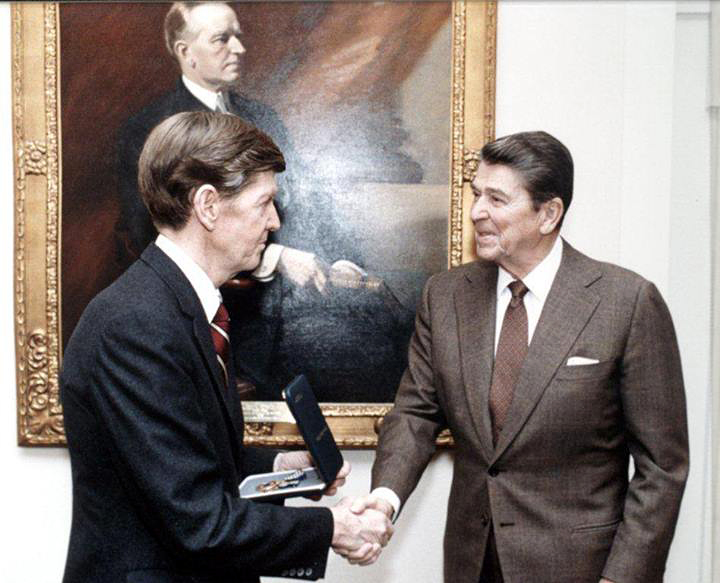
President Ronald Reagan awarding Hughes the National Security Medal in 1984

John T. Hughes (1928–1992) was an intelligence officer of the U.S. Defense Intelligence Agency, specializing in Soviet military capabilities and best known for his nationally televised briefing on the removal of Soviet missiles in Cuba, during the Cuban Missile Crisis. A past photo analyst, Hughes had been part of the famous U-2 collection program from the earliest days of its operation. Over the years he personally briefed Presidents John F. Kennedy, Gerald R. Ford, Jimmy Carter and Ronald Reagan on highly classified photographs of Soviet military installations and other sensitive security matters. Hughes guided DIA's collection and analysis, and served as a principal intelligence adviser to the Secretary of Defense, the Chairman of the Joint Chiefs of Staff, and the Director of the Defense Intelligence Agency.

John T. Hughes was born in Trenton, NJ. He graduated from Trenton Central High School in 1946. He trained as an educator at New Jersey State Teachers College (The College of NJ), graduating in 1950. After graduation, he went on to earn a master's degree in geography from Clark University and to serve as a photo interpreter in the Army Photographic Intelligence Center from 1954 to 1957.
