= Joint Functional Component Command for Intelligence, Surveillance and Reconnaissance =

US defense unit

The Joint Functional Component Command for Intelligence, Surveillance and Reconnaissance (JFCC ISR) was a subordinate command of the United States Strategic Command, one of the nine Unified Combatant Commands under the United States Department of Defense (DOD) and co-located with the Defense Intelligence Agency (DIA). It served as the center for planning, execution, and assessment of the United States military's global Intelligence, Surveillance, and Reconnaissance operations from 2005-2016; a key enabler in achieving global situational awareness. In 2016 JFCC-ISR was realigned to the Joint Staff.

== Mission ==
In support of USSTRATCOM's global ISR mission, JFCC-ISR develops strategies and plans; integrates national, DoD, and international partner capabilities; and executes DoD ISR operations to satisfy combatant command and national operational and intelligence requirements.

== Mission specifics ==
Established in March 2005 as a component of USSTRATCOM, and officially active on 4 November 2005, JFCC-ISR conducts planning to employ DoD ISR resources to meet national, departmental, and combatant command requirements. In coordination with the Defense Intelligence Agency (DIA), National Geospatial-Intelligence Agency (NGA), National Security Agency (NSA), National Reconnaissance Office (NRO), United States Joint Forces Command (USJFCOM), the military services and other mission partners, JFCC-ISR ensures the integration of DOD and national ISR efforts to satisfy combatant command and national operational and intelligence requirements. JFCC-ISR synchronizes the use of national, DoD, and allies’ ISR capabilities with the employment of theater ISR resources and, when appropriate, with other collection activities, including human intelligence, measurement, and signature intelligence, signals intelligence, imagery intelligence, and open-source intelligence.

JFCC-ISR planning includes an assessment of potential risks and intelligence gaps associated with proposed options and recommends actions to mitigate risks and gaps. When options involve the use of theater ISR assets, JFCC-ISR communicates with theater and service operations and intelligence staff to coordinate operations and resolve competition for ISR resources. JFCC-ISR monitors the execution of planned ISR activities. JFCC-ISR generates an ISR Global Situation Awareness display and shares data from that display with appropriate entities. As data is collected and becomes usable, JFCC-ISR ensures its availability to the widest body of operators, planners, and analytic organizations. JFCC-ISR evaluates collected data and recommends adjustments to plans or other actions to improve collection results.

== Divisions ==
Upon transfer to the Joint Staff, the J-32’s four divisions were renamed: Mission Management, Force Management, ISR Assessment, and Operations & Integration. These divisions were specifically responsible for the following:

- Develop and maintain a Global Situational Awareness display of deployed ISR
- Participate in adaptive planning to support combatant commands' Intelligence Campaign Planning efforts
- Recommend allocation strategies based on operational and intelligence requirements
- Help combatant commands synchronize DoD collection with activities of national/international ISR collectors
- Recommend actions to persuade or dissuade adversaries through the use of ISR operations
- Manage the special activities approval process to synchronize and optimize use of ISR assets
- Help develop courses of action and options to mitigate consequent risks and gaps
- Use modeling/simulation tools to test support plans and determine optimal allocation of ISR assets
- Assess/identify/define gaps, shortfalls, priorities and redundancies of ISR capabilities
- Integrate ISR Special Activities in support of combatant command requirements

== Realignment to Joint Staff ==
JFCC-ISR’s functions moved from USSTRATCOM and DIA to the Joint Staff in late 2016. The new office was named Deputy Director, Intelligence, Surveillance and Reconnaissance Operations (J-32) and Director, Joint Intelligence, Surveillance and Reconnaissance Operations Center (JISROC). Rear Adm. Brett Heimbigner was the last Commander of JFCC-ISR and the first Director of J-32. The Secretary of Defense designated the Joint ISR Operations Center (JISROC) as a Chairman’s Controlled Activity (CCA) on 9 November 2017. The J-32 serves “dual-hatted” as both the Director of the JISROC.

== List of directors ==
No.	Deputy Commander		Term			Service branch	Ref.
No.	Portrait	Name	Took office	Left office	Term length	Service branch	Ref.
-	Peter J. Lambert	Major General; Peter J. Lambert	April 2018	September 2019	~1 year, 153 days	U.S. Air Force	
-	James R. Cluff	Brigadier General; James R. Cluff	September 2019	July 2020	~304 days	U.S. Air Force	
-	Julian C. Cheater	Brigadier General; Julian C. Cheater	July 2020	July 2021	~1 year	U.S. Air Force	
-	Michael L. Downs	Major General; Michael L. Downs	June 2021	April 2023	~1 year, 304 days	U.S. Air Force	
-	Larry R. Broadwell	Brigadier General; Larry R. Broadwell	April 2023	Incumbent	~3 years, 116 days	U.S. Air Force	
