= Strategic Support Branch =

Former U.S. intelligence organization

- Active: 2001
- Country: United States
- Branch: Department of Defense
- Type: Human Intelligence
- Nickname: SSB
- Engagements: Operation Enduring Freedom; Operation Iraqi Freedom

The Strategic Support Branch (SSB) was a United States intelligence organization created by the Department of Defense (DoD) with support from the Defense Intelligence Agency (DIA) and the Central Intelligence Agency (CIA). The SSB's mission was to provide an intelligence capability for field operation units, and U.S. Special Operations Forces (SOF), in support of anti-terrorism and counter-terrorism missions in war zones and beyond. The SSB has been dissolved with many of its activities and capabilities transferred to DIA's Defense Clandestine Service.

== Overview ==
Originally titled Human Augmentation Teams, the Strategic Support Branch was established to give DoD an increase of human intelligence capabilities and what was considered by former Secretary of Defense Donald Rumsfeld an end to "near total dependence on the CIA" for human intelligence.

Although the SSB was designed to operate without detection and under the defense secretary's direct control, it is commanded by high-ranking military officials. Strategic Support teams have about 10 members each, consisting of case officers, linguists, interrogators and other specialists from the Defense Human Intelligence Service, a branch of the DIA. The missions they undertake are secret, but members do not use covert methods like false identities or nationalities. The unit operated secretly in Iraq, Afghanistan and several classified locations for two years. The SSB works directly with United States Special Operations Command (USSOCOM) to add missing capabilities such as the skill to establish local spy networks and the technology for direct access to national intelligence databases to USSOCOM's special operations units, specifically the special missions units of the Joint Special Operations Command (JSOC). Also USSOCOM previously had to receive permission from the CIA to conduct clandestine operations in certain countries, but that was no longer necessary after the establishment of the SSB. DoD has decided that it will coordinate its human intelligence missions with the CIA but will not, as in the past, await consent.

=== Controversy ===
The Strategic Support Branch was financed using "reprogrammed" funds, without explicit authority or appropriation of the United States Congress. The Pentagon hadn't released any details of the unit's operations or even of its existence to Congress until after an article about the secret unit was released by The Washington Post.

Pentagon officials emphasized their intention to remain accountable to Congress, but they also asserted that Defense intelligence missions are subject to fewer legal constraints than believed. That assertion involves new interpretations of Title 10 of the U.S. Code, which governs the armed services, and Title 50, which governs, among other things, foreign intelligence. Under Title 10, for example, the Defense Department must report to Congress all "deployment orders", or formal instructions from the Joint Chiefs of Staff to position U.S. forces for combat. But guidelines issued by former Undersecretary for Intelligence Stephen A. Cambone state that special operations forces may "conduct clandestine HUMINT operations... before publication" of a deployment order, rendering notification unnecessary. Pentagon lawyers also define the "War on Terror" as ongoing, indefinite, and global in scope. That analysis effectively discards the limitation of the defense secretary's war powers to times and places of imminent combat.
