= Defense Clandestine Service =

Espionage arm of the US Defense Intelligence Agency

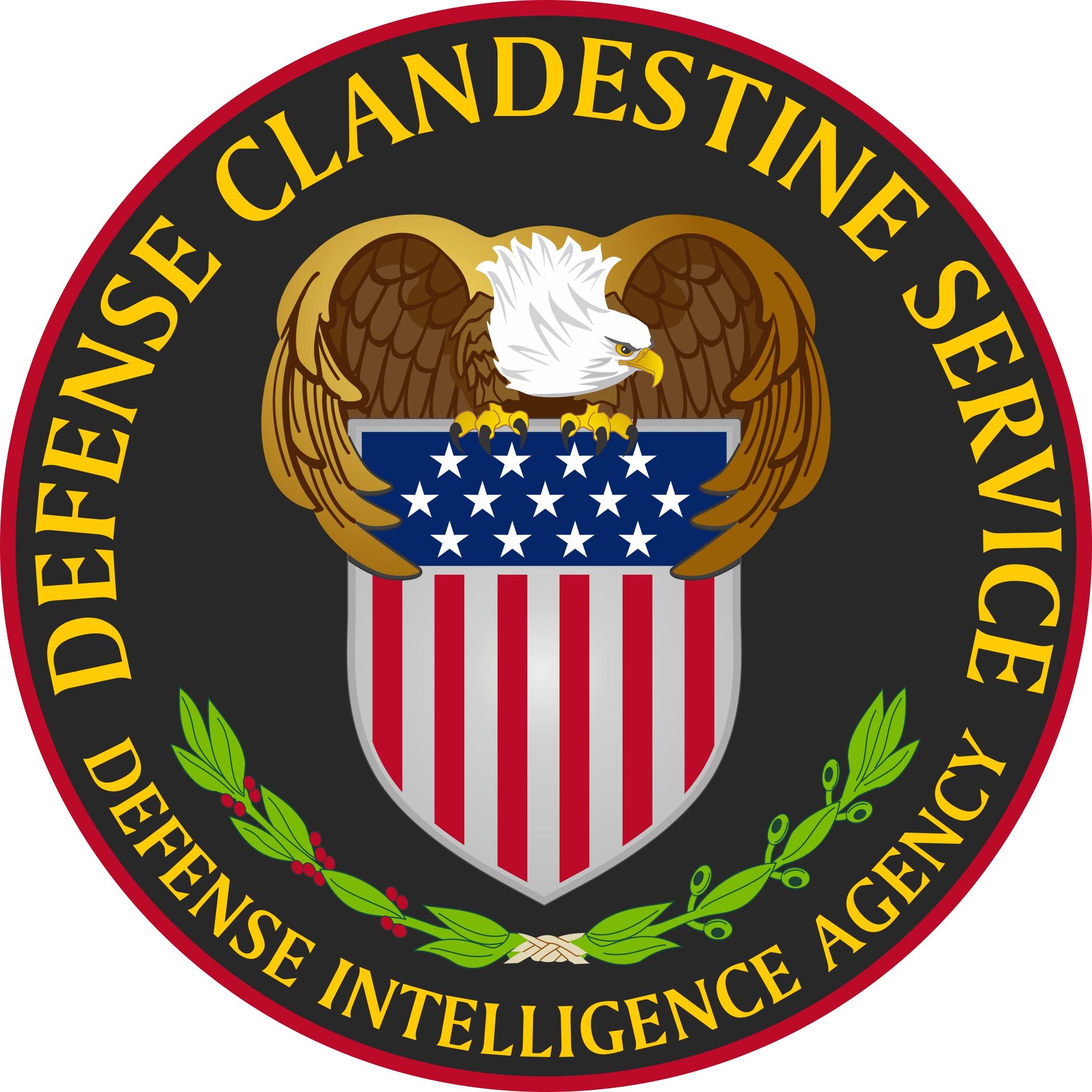

Agency overview
- Preceding Agency: Defense Human Intelligence Service
- Jurisdiction: Federal government of the United States
- Headquarters: Defense Intelligence Agency Headquarters
- Employees: c. 500
- Agency executive: James H. Adams III
- Parent Agency: Defense Intelligence Agency
- Website: www.dia.mil

The Defense Clandestine Service (DCS) is an arm of the Defense Intelligence Agency (DIA) that conducts clandestine espionage, intelligence gathering activities and classified operations around the world to provide insights and answer national-level defense objectives for senior U.S. policymakers and American military leaders. Staffed by civilian and military personnel, DCS is part of DIA's Directorate of Operations and works with the Central Intelligence Agency's Directorate of Operations and the U.S. military's Joint Special Operations Command. DCS consists of about 500 clandestine operatives, about as many case officers the CIA had in the early 2000s before its expansion.

DCS is not a "new" intelligence agency but rather a consolidation, expansion and realignment of existing Defense HUMINT activities that have been carried out by DIA for decades under various names, most recently as the Defense Human Intelligence Service.

== History ==
In 2012, the Pentagon announced its intention to increase its espionage beyond war zones and to spy more on high-priority targets, such as Iran. To this end, the DIA consolidated several of its military-intelligence elements, including the Defense Human Intelligence and Counterterrorism Center, the Counterintelligence Field Activity, the Strategic Support Branch, and the Defense Attaché System.

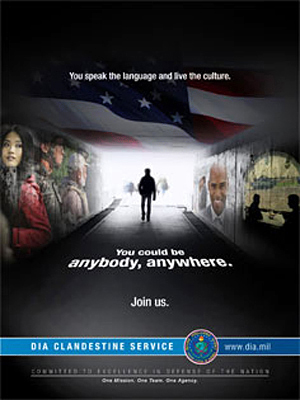
Defense Clandestine Service recruitment poster

The plan was developed in response to a classified study completed in 2011 by the Director of National Intelligence, which concluded that the military's espionage efforts needed to be more focused on major targets beyond the tactical considerations of Iraq and Afghanistan. While in the past, DIA was effectively conducting its traditional, and much larger, mission of providing intelligence to troops and commanders in war zones, the study said it needed to focus more attention outside the battlefields on "national intelligence": gathering and distributing information on global issues and sharing that intelligence with other agencies. The realignment was expected to affect several hundred operatives who already worked in intelligence assignments abroad, mostly as case officers for the DIA, which serves as the Pentagon's main source of human intelligence and analysis. The new service was expected to grow by several hundred operatives and was intended to complement the espionage network of the CIA, which focuses on a wider array of non-military threats.

The original Defense Clandestine Service, an outgrowth of the Monarch Eagle concept, was created and implemented in 1984. It was backed by Senators Barry Goldwater and Jesse Helms, with the support of Chairman of the Joint Chiefs General John Vessey, Assistant Secretary of the Army for Manpower & Reserve Affairs (M&RA) William D. Clark, and Deputy Assistant Secretary of Defense for Intelligence Frank Aurilio. It consolidated the clandestine intelligence programs of each of the military services into a single DOD program, thus eliminating duplication of effort and providing a promotion path for case officers to achieve flag rank. The Goldwater–Nichols Act was designed to support this objective as service at the DOD level would count toward the joint service requirement to achieve flag rank. The DOD Clandestine Service was to close intelligence gaps in countries regarded as potential adversaries or sites of activities requiring a military response; these gaps had gone unaddressed under CIA priorities.

== Seal blazon and symbolism ==
On a roundel sable, fimbriated gules, an American bald eagle displayed and inverted proper, beaked and taloned Or, grasping in its talons an escutcheon. The escutcheon argent, six pallets gules; on a chief azure, thirteen mullets of the field. Beneath the escutcheon, a wreath of laurel and olive vert, fructed gules. In chief, an arch of letters Or reading 'DEFENSE CLANDESTINE SERVICE'. In base, an arch of letters Or reading 'DEFENSE INTELLIGENCE AGENCY'.

The eagle and shield are prominent symbols of the Department of Defense. The perch and sharp eye of the eagle denote the Defense Clandestine Service's ability to plan, coordinate, and execute worldwide missions. Here the eagle looks to its left side, illustrating the Service's competence to meet national level defense intelligence requirements. The wings slightly cloak the shield, alluding to clandestine and overt operations. The wreath of laurel and olive honors the teamwork among Defense Intelligence Agency clandestine service members, in concert with the Central Intelligence Agency, the Federal Bureau of Investigation, and Combatant Commands. The black disc underscores the worldwide clandestine operations of the Defense Clandestine Service.
