= Missile and Space Intelligence Center =

US Defense Intelligence Agency department

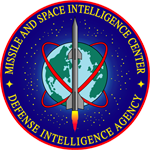
- Seal of MSIC

Agency overview
- Formed: June 1956; 70 years ago (as Technical Intelligence Division, renamed Missile Intelligence Office in 1962, renamed Missile Intelligence Agency in 1970, became Missile and Space Intelligence Center in 1985)
- Type: Component of departmental agency (since 1992)
- Jurisdiction: Federal agency operating in US, but analyzing foreign military intelligence
- Headquarters: Richard C. Shelby Center for Missile Intelligence (Shelby Center), Redstone Arsenal, Alabama, U.S.; 34.64497°N 86.65799°W
- Employees: Approx. 650 (2009)
- Annual budget: Classified
- Agency executive: Steven Rush, Director
- Parent department: United States Department of Defense
- Parent agency: Defense Intelligence Agency (since 1992)

The Missile and Space Intelligence Center (MSIC) is a component of the U.S. Defense Intelligence Agency. MSIC is located at Redstone Arsenal in Huntsville, Alabama.

== History ==
MSIC began as a part of Wernher von Braun's missile team, a component of the Army Ballistic Missile Agency in 1956. The missile agency's first iteration, known as the Technical Intelligence Division, consisted of only six people. Renamed in 1962, the TID, now the Missile Intelligence Office (MIO) analyzed developments in the Soviet Union and played a key role in the Cuban Missile Crisis. The Missile Intelligence Office was renamed the Missile Intelligence Agency in 1970; in 1985, it was reassigned to the Army Intelligence Agency and renamed to the Missile and Space Intelligence Center (MSIC). MSIC's final organizational move came on January 1, 1992 when it became part of the Defense Intelligence Agency.

In 2009, the Center employed 650 civilian and military personnel. In 2014, it employed roughly the same amount at its headquarters in Redstone Arsenal. Between 2014 and the present (2021), the Center employed approximately 350 civilians, 60 military personnel, and, indirectly, hundreds of defense contractors.

== Mission ==
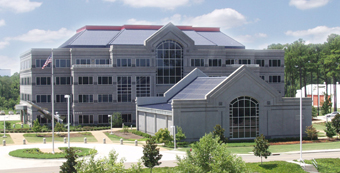
MSIC Building

MSIC's overall mission is to support field commanders, weapon system developers, and policy makers with scientific and technical all-source intelligence on surface-to-air missiles (SAM), short-range ballistic missiles (SRBM) with ranges less than 1,000 kilometers, anti-tank guided missiles (ATGM), missile defense systems, directed-energy weapons (DEW), selected space programs and systems, and relevant command, control, communications, computers, intelligence, surveillance, and reconnaissance (C4ISR). It also provides analyses of those materials to the Department of Defense and other U.S. government organizations such as the FBI.

In 2011, a years-long MSIC dispute with the Air Force's NASIC over which agency held authority over ballistic missile intelligence analysis was settled in favor of MSIC, which became lead integrator of the Defense Intelligence Ballistic Missile Analysis Committee (DIBMAC).

== Organization ==
MSIC is a component of the Defense Intelligence Agency's Directorate for Analysis; the DIA itself is a part of the Department of Defense and Intelligence Community. The Center is led by a Director, currently Kimberly "Kim" King, who replaced Mark Clark after his 2019 retirement.

MSIC's Foreign Military Exploitation team is responsible for dismantling, researching, and testing foreign missile systems.

MSIC also possesses laboratories dedicated to materials, microelectronics, missile guidance and control systems, radio frequency hardware, and electro-optical and infrared hardware; there is also a Signal Analysis Lab. It also possesses an anechoic chamber and oversees the Joint Research Analysis and Assessment Center (JRAAC), a state-of-the-art simulation integration facility supporting multi-fidelity scientific and technical analysis of integrated weapons systems in complex environments to determine their capabilities, vulnerabilities, and limitations. JRAAC integrates over 80 weapons systems models, including radars, missiles, command and control (C2) systems, and C4ISR (Command, Control, Communications, Computers, Intelligence, Surveillance, and Reconnaissance).

== Headquarters ==
MSIC employs engineering analysts, support professionals, and support assistants at the 38,000-acre Richard C. Shelby Center for Missile Intelligence at Redstone Arsenal in Huntsville, Alabama. The building includes various laboratories, high-performance computing operations, and test areas, making up a vast engineering complex capable of hosting both physical and simulated missile tests.

== See also ==
- National Air and Space Intelligence Center
- Space Delta 18
