= Defense Attaché System =

US government organization

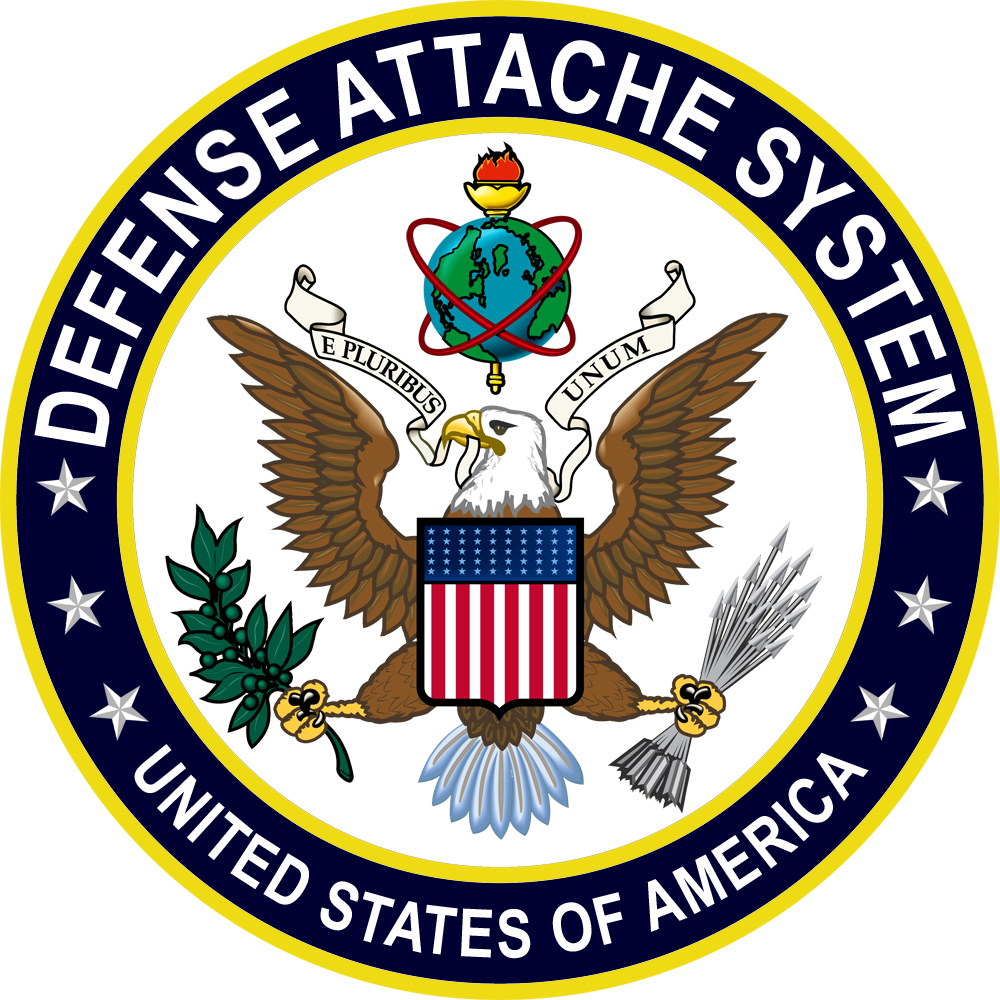
- Seal of DAS

Agency overview
- Formed: December 12, 1964; 61 years ago
- Headquarters: DIA Headquarters, Joint Base Anacostia–Bolling, Washington, D.C.
- Parent department: United States Department of Defense
- Parent agency: Defense Intelligence Agency

The Defense Attaché System is an arm of the Defense Intelligence Agency tasked with representing the United States in defense and military related matters with foreign governments around the world. Defense Attaché Offices (DAO) operate from U.S. embassies in more than a hundred locations globally. DAOs are composed of both civilian and military employees, most of whom receive specialized training at Joint Military Attaché School before their appointment.

== History ==
In 1949, the Department of Defense (DoD) established the need for each branch of the military to establish its own attaché system in coordination with the State Department. From July 1951 to March 1952 the secretary of defense, at Joint Chiefs of Staff (JCS) urging, established a limited Executive Agent System in support of attaché operations.

The DoD's Office of Special Operations (OSO) negotiated with the Department of State for opening the attaché systems. Upon the activation of the Defense Intelligence Agency (DIA), and the subsequent disestablishment of OSO, DIA assumed responsibility. In 1961, the secretary of defense deferred the placement of all attachés under DIA management, and the services continued to manage, operate, and support their individual attaché systems.

Several problems existed with the control of attachés under the different branches of the military. Each reported separately to the ambassador and represented the U.S. separately to the host country military, causing duplication of effort. Moreover, the distribution of information was poor. Artificial barriers to a free exchange of information between the branches and the JCS existed, and the coordination of attaché activities with other DoD elements was difficult. The cost to DoD in sponsoring up to three separate elements in a single country amounted to the inefficient use of limited resources. Furthermore, the collection and dissemination of duplicate intelligence produced uncertainties. So, on 12 December 1964, the Defense Attaché System (DAS) was established in response to these problems.

On 1 July 1965, the Defense Attaché System officially came under the director of the Defense Intelligence Agency. The objectives of the DAS under DIA are twofold: to provide a more efficient system for the collection of intelligence information for DoD components and to preserve a channel for service-to-service and DoD representational matters of common interest.

== Chronology ==
- 1889: Permanent military attachés sent to embassies in London, Berlin, Paris, Vienna, and St. Petersburg. (By 1896, military attachés were serving also in Rome, Madrid, and Brussels.)
- 1918: 24 military attachés accredited to 28 capitals and 15 naval attachés to 18 capitals.
- 1936: 464 military and naval attachés abroad.
- 1945: Military attachés in 45 capitals
- 1948: 258 Army and Air Force officers on attaché duty in 59 countries and 120 naval officers in 43 countries.
- 1949: 2,049 personnel on attaché duty; a Senior Attaché was designated for each capital.
- 1950: Attachés were cut by 35%, and 36 posts were eliminated; totals were 1,458.
- 1951: Executive agency system replaced the Senior Attaché system.
- 1952: Executive agency system abandoned, and Services reassumed logistical and administrative support for own attachés.
- 1956: 166 attaché posts in 71 countries: 68 Army, 45 Navy, 53 Air Force; total personnel.
- 1956: Sixty foreign countries had 121 attachés in Washington: 57 Army, 32 Navy, 32 Air Force.
- 1960: The Defense Department had 2,090 attaché personnel in 74 capitals.
- 1963: Attaché personnel reached a high of 2,345.
- 1964: U.S. attaché personnel reduced to 1,936.
- 1965: Defense Attaché System established.
- 1986: Coast Guard officers begin to serve as defense attachés.

== See also ==
- Military attaché
- Defense Attaché Office, Saigon (1973–1975)
