= Smirnykh (air base) =

Abandoned airbase in Sakhalin

Smirnykh Kiton
- Smirnykh, Sakhalin Oblast in Russia
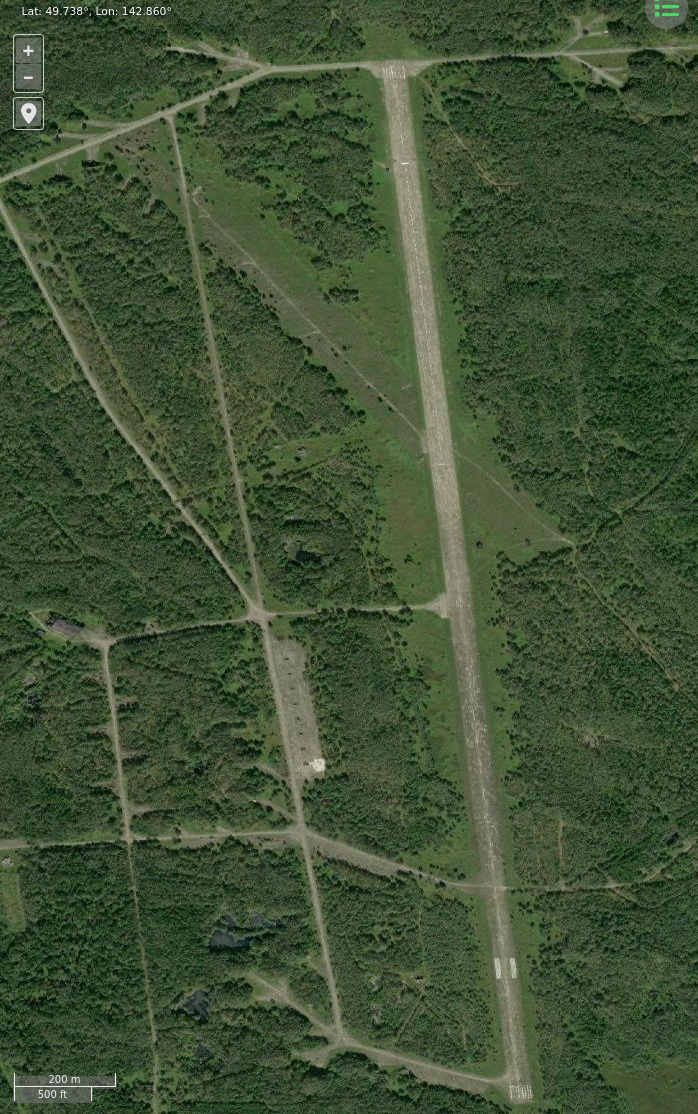
- Satellite imagery of former Smirnykh air base

Site information
- Type: Air Base
- Owner: Ministry of Defence
- Operator: Russian Air Force

Location
- Shown within Sakhalin Oblast Smirnykh (Russia)
- Coordinates: 49°44′18″N 142°51′36″E

Site history
- In use: 1945 - 1994

Airfield information
- Elevation: 43 metres (141 ft) AMSL
Runways
Direction	Length and surface
01/19	2,500 metres (8,202 ft) Concrete

Smirnykh (Russian: Смирных) is an abandoned Russian Air Force airbase in Sakhalin, Russia located 2 km east of the village of the same name. It appeared in June 1966 KH-7 imagery with a runway length of 2,000 m. It was expanded sometime after this to 2,500 m with a new extension of revetments added.

== History ==
The base was originally built near the town of Smirnykh, a coaling and watering station for the Sakhalin railway. The airfield was built by the Imperial Japanese Army in the early 20th century and was called Keton. After the Second World War, Southern Sakhalin was handed over to the Soviet Union, and the airbase was then expanded. The airfield was first detected by Western intelligence around 1962. By 1965 19 Yakovlev Yak-28P (ASCC: Firebar) were known to be stationed at the airfield.

In October 1972 a US reconnaissance satellite assessment showed 17 Yak-28P long-range interceptors, 2 Antonov An-24 (ASCC: Coke) transports, and 1 Lisunov Li-2 (ASCC: Cab) (DC-3 copy) transport.

By the 1980s Smirnykh was home to a Mikoyan-Gurevich MiG-23 (ASCC: Flogger-G) interceptor regiment An ICAO report on the 1983 downing of Korean Air Lines Flight 007 indicated Soviet Air Defence Forces (PVO) MiG-23 fighter aircraft from Smirnykh were scrambled, but it was an Sukhoi Su-15 (ASCC: Flagon) jet from Dolinsk-Sokol which carried out the shootdown.

The airfield is no longer in use and the runways have not been maintained in decades.

The base was used by the:

- 132nd Heavy Bomber Aviation Regiment between 1945 and 1951 with the Tupolev Tu-2 (ASCC: Bat)
- 301st Fighter Aviation Regiment during 1972 with the Sukhoi Su-9 (ASCC: Fishpot)
- 454th Bomber Aviation Regiment between 1945 and 1951 with the Tu-2
- 528th Fighter Aviation Regiment between 1945 and 1994

== See also ==
- List of Soviet Air Force bases
- List of military airbases in Russia
