= Alvin Snyder =

American journalist, author (1936–2019)

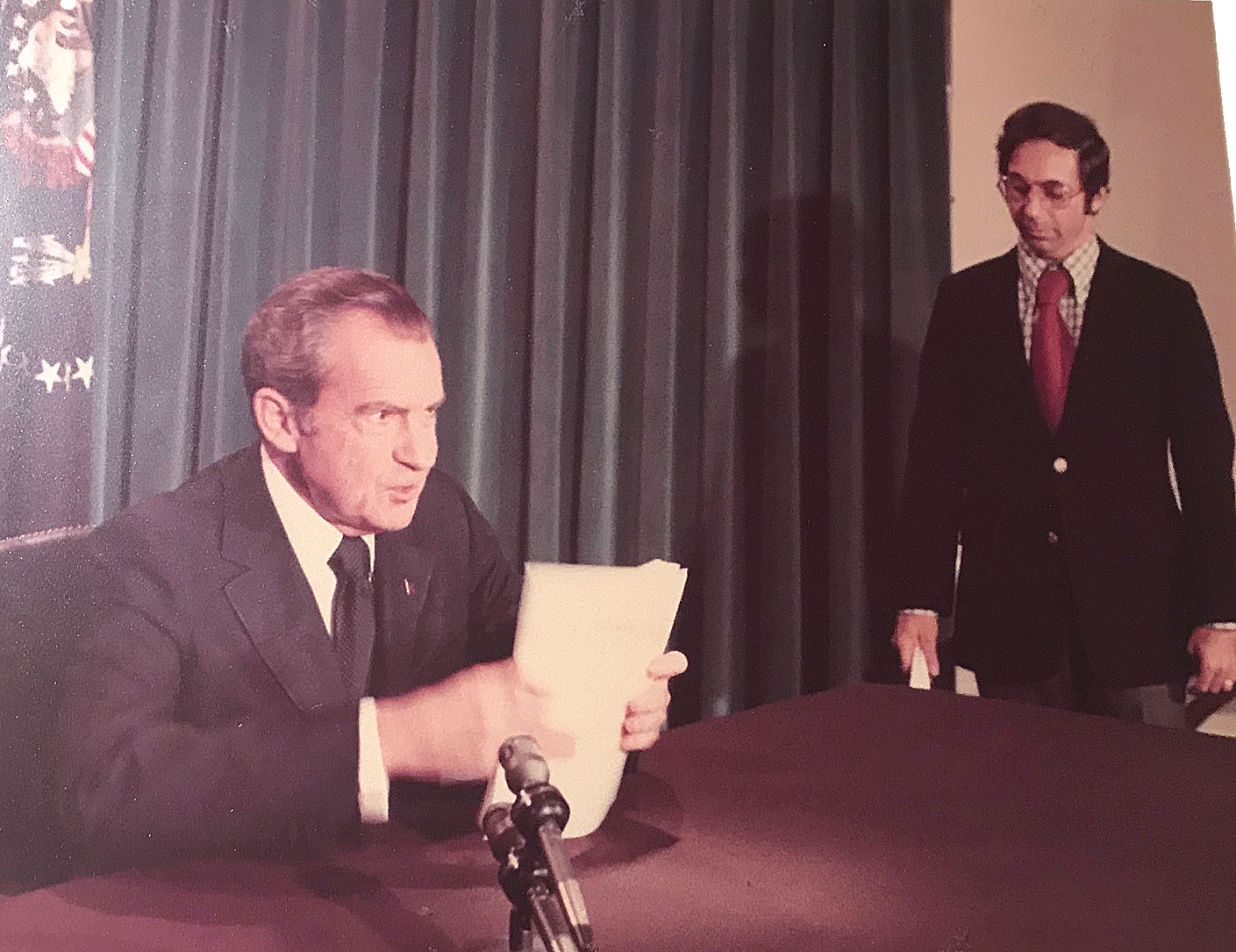
- Snyder with President Nixon during the latter's resignation speech
- Born: March 31, 1936; Trenton, New Jersey, U.S.
- Died: January 28, 2019 (aged 82); McLean, Virginia, U.S.
- Occupations: Journalist, author
- Notable work: Warriors of Disinformation: American Propaganda, Soviet Lies, and the Winning of the Cold War (1995)

Alvin Snyder (March 31, 1936 – January 28, 2019) was an American journalist, author, and former Director of TV and Film Service at the United States Information Agency.

== Early life ==
Snyder was born on March 31, 1936, in Trenton, New Jersey. He graduated from the University of Miami in 1958.

== Career ==
Snyder started his career at CBS News in New York in 1959 as a news producer and was an editor on a documentary on Edward R. Murrow that won a Grammy award in 1967. He was later recruited by the Nixon White House and appointed Deputy Special Assistant by Richard Nixon to run TV operations in the newly established Office of Communications.

Alvin Snyder was featured on David Frost's series Playhouse Presents. "Nixon's the One," a reenactment using verbatim dialogue from the Nixon White House tapes, featured actor Ryan McLuskey as Snyder opposite Harry Shearer's Nixon during the President's resignation address.

=== USIA and KAL 007 role ===
Later he became a Director of TV and Film at the US Information Agency in Washington as an aide to Charles Z. Wick. A key contribution for Snyder at the USIA was documented after the downing of Korean Air Lines Flight 007. Snyder was credited with producing the video shown to the United Nations Security Council in 1983 that uncovered more evidence of Russia's role in the downing of the civilian aircraft.

=== Writing career ===
Later as a fellow at the Annenberg Foundation, he published a widely used text on the use of propaganda by the US Government. Snyder also was a Senior Fellow for the University of Southern California Center for Public Diplomacy.

Snyder is also well known for writing the book Warriors of Disinformation: American Propaganda, Soviet Lies, and the Winning of the Cold War (1995). In his 1995 memoir, he wrote that "the U.S. government ran a full-service public relations organization, the largest in the world, about the size of the twenty biggest U.S. commercial PR firms combined. Its full-time professional staff of more than 10,000 spread out among some 150 countries, burnished America‘s image and trashed the Soviet Union 2,500 hours a week with a tower of babble comprised of more than 70 languages, to the tune of over $2 billion per year", and "the biggest branch of this propaganda machine" was the USIA.

== Later life ==
Snyder died at the age of 82 in McLean, Virginia.

== Publications ==
- Snyder, Alvin (1995). Warriors of Disinformation: American Propaganda, Soviet Lies, and the Winning of the Cold War. Arcade. ISBN 9781559703895.
