= Dolinsk-Sokol (air base) =

Reserve military airfield in Sakhalin

Dolinsk-Sokol
- Долинск-Сокол
- Dolinsk, Sakhalin Oblast in Russia
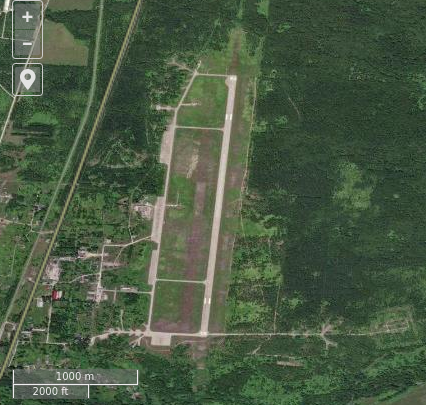
- Satellite imagery of Dolinsk-Sokol air base

Site information
- Type: Air Base
- Owner: Ministry of Defence
- Operator: Russian Aerospace Force

Location
- Shown within Sakhalin Oblast Dolinsk-Sokol (Russia)
- Coordinates: 47°15′42″N 142°46′6″E

Site history
- Built: 1945
- In use: 1945 - present

Airfield information
- Identifiers: ICAO: XHSO
- Elevation: 33 metres (108 ft) AMSL
Runways
Direction	Length and surface
02/20	2,500 metres (8,202 ft) Concrete

Dolinsk-Sokol is a reserve military air base in Sakhalin Oblast, Russia located 8 km south of Dolinsk. It is a small base with numerous hardened hangars (aircraft shelters).

It existed before June 1966 according to declassified KH-7 satellite images. Its chief operating unit was 777th Fighter Aviation Regiment PVO (777 IAP), flying the Sukhoi Su-15, MiG-23, and Sukhoi Su-27 during its 40 years of tenure. In the 1980s it received the Mikoyan MiG-31. It is also listed as being home to 361 IIVP (361st Instruction Test Helicopter Regiment) flying Mil Mi-24 and Mil Mi-8 helicopters.

In the early 1980s, Mikoyan-Gurevich MiG-21 Fishbed aircraft occasionally deployed from Dolinsk-Sokol to the front-line airfield of Burevestnik, 240 miles to the southeast on the Kuril Islands In early 1983 Dolinsk-Sokol began deploying newer MiG-23 from Dolinsk-Sokol to Burevestnik after upgrades were completed there.

Dolinsk-Sokol is famous for being home to the Sukhoi Su-15 that shot down Korean Air Lines Flight 007 near Moneron Island in September 1983. At that time, base commander was General Anatoly Kornukov, who later become Commander of the Russian Air Force. At the time of the shootdown, Kornukov apparently ordered the shootdown to prevent KAL 007 from leaving Sakhalin airspace.

== See also ==
- List of military airbases in Russia
