= Korean Air Lines Flight 007 =

1983 aircraft shotdown over the Sea of Japan

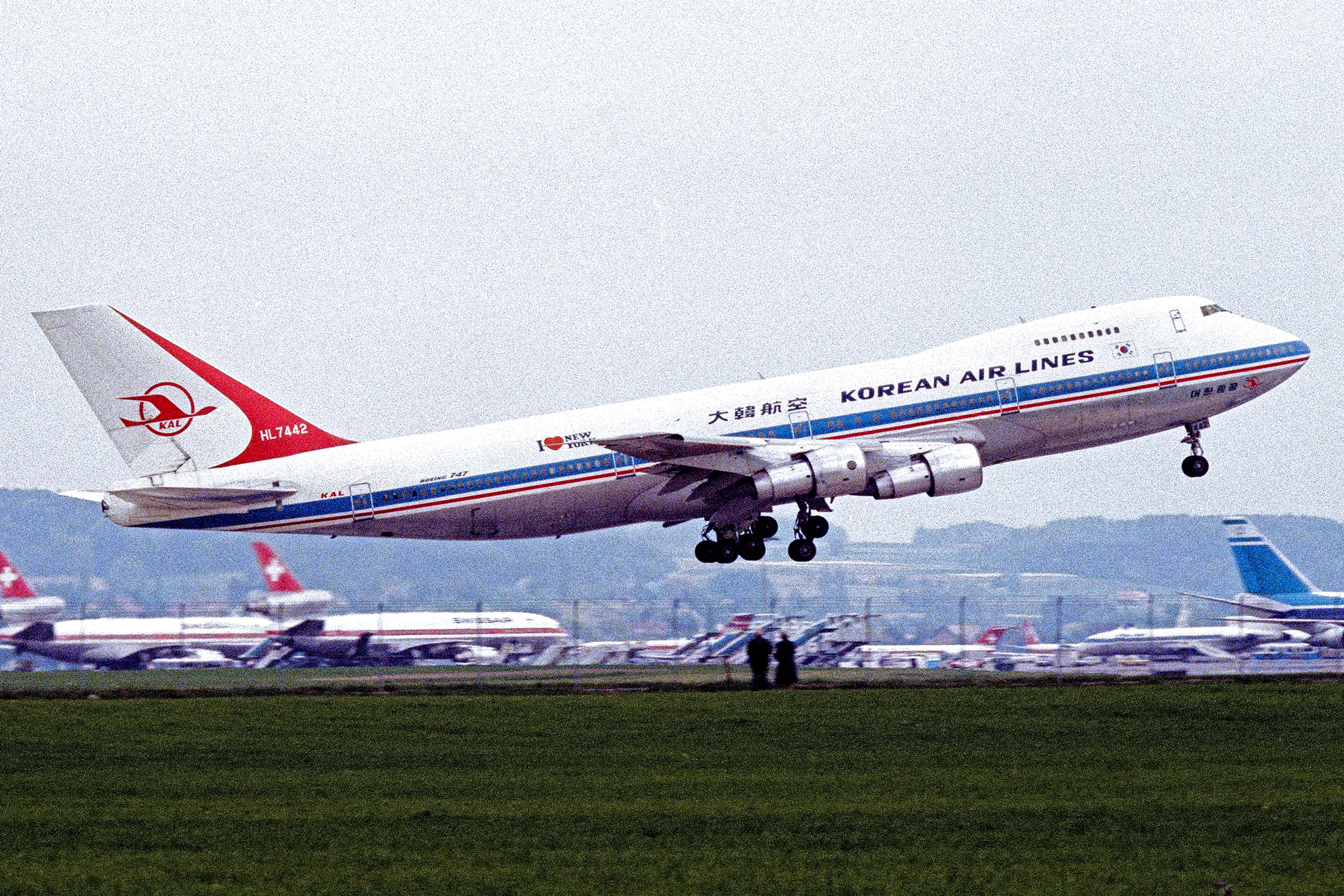
- HL7442, the aircraft involved, pictured in 1980

Shootdown
- Date: September 1, 1983
- Summary: Shot down by the Soviet Air Defense Forces after navigation error by the pilots
- Site: Sea of Japan, near Moneron Island, west of Sakhalin Island, Russian SFSR, Soviet Union; 46°34′N 141°17′E

Aircraft
- Aircraft type: Boeing 747-230B
- Operator: Korean Air Lines
- IATA flight No.: KE007
- ICAO flight No.: KAL007
- Call sign: KOREAN AIR 007
- Registration: HL7442
- Flight origin: John F. Kennedy International Airport, New York City, U.S.
- Stopover: Anchorage International Airport, Anchorage, Alaska, U.S.
- Destination: Kimpo International Airport, Kangso District, Seoul, South Korea
- Occupants: 269
- Passengers: 246
- Crew: 23 (Note: 3 cockpit crew, 20 cabin crew and 6 deadheading crew (ICAO 93, Sect. 1.3, p. 6))
- Fatalities: 269
- Survivors: 0

Korean Air Lines Flight 007 was a scheduled Korean Air Lines flight from New York City to Seoul via Anchorage. On September 1, 1983, the flight was shot down by a Soviet Sukhoi Su-15 interceptor aircraft. The Boeing 747-230B airliner was en route from Anchorage to Seoul, but owing to a navigational mistake made by the crew, the airliner drifted from its planned route and flew through Soviet airspace. The Soviet Air Forces treated the unidentified aircraft as an intruding U.S. spy plane, and destroyed it with air-to-air missiles, after firing warning shots. The South Korean airliner eventually crashed into the sea near Moneron Island west of Sakhalin in the Sea of Japan, killing all 246 passengers and 23 crew aboard, including Larry McDonald, a United States representative. It is the worst Korean Air disaster to date, as well as the deadliest shootdown of a civilian airliner by other aircraft in history.

The Soviet Union initially denied knowledge of the incident, but later admitted to shooting down the aircraft, claiming that it was on a MASINT spy mission. The Politburo of the Communist Party of the Soviet Union said it was a deliberate provocation by the United States to probe the Soviet Union's military preparedness, or even to provoke a war. The U.S. accused the Soviet Union of obstructing search and rescue operations. The Soviet Armed Forces suppressed evidence sought by the International Civil Aviation Organization (ICAO) investigation, such as the flight recorders, which were released in 1992, after the dissolution of the Soviet Union.

As a result of the incident, the United States altered tracking procedures for aircraft departing from Alaska, and President Ronald Reagan issued a directive making American satellite-based radio navigation Global Positioning System freely available for civilian use, once it was sufficiently developed, as a common good.

== Details of the flight ==
=== Aircraft ===
The aircraft flying as Korean Air Lines Flight 007 was a Boeing 747-230B jet airliner with Boeing serial number 20559. The aircraft was powered by four Pratt & Whitney JT9D-7A engines. It had been delivered new to Condor in 1972 as D-ABYH. It was sold to Korean Air Lines in 1979, re-registered HL7442 and was 11.5 years old at the time of incident. It was the 186th 747 built.

=== Passengers and crew ===
Nation	Victims
Australia	2
Hong Kong	12
Canada	8
Dominican Republic	1
India	1
Iran	1
Japan	28
Malaysia	1
Philippines	16
South Korea	105*
Sweden	1
Taiwan	23
Thailand	5
United Kingdom	2
United States	62
Vietnam	1
Total	269
* 246 passengers, 17 active crew and 6 deadheading crew

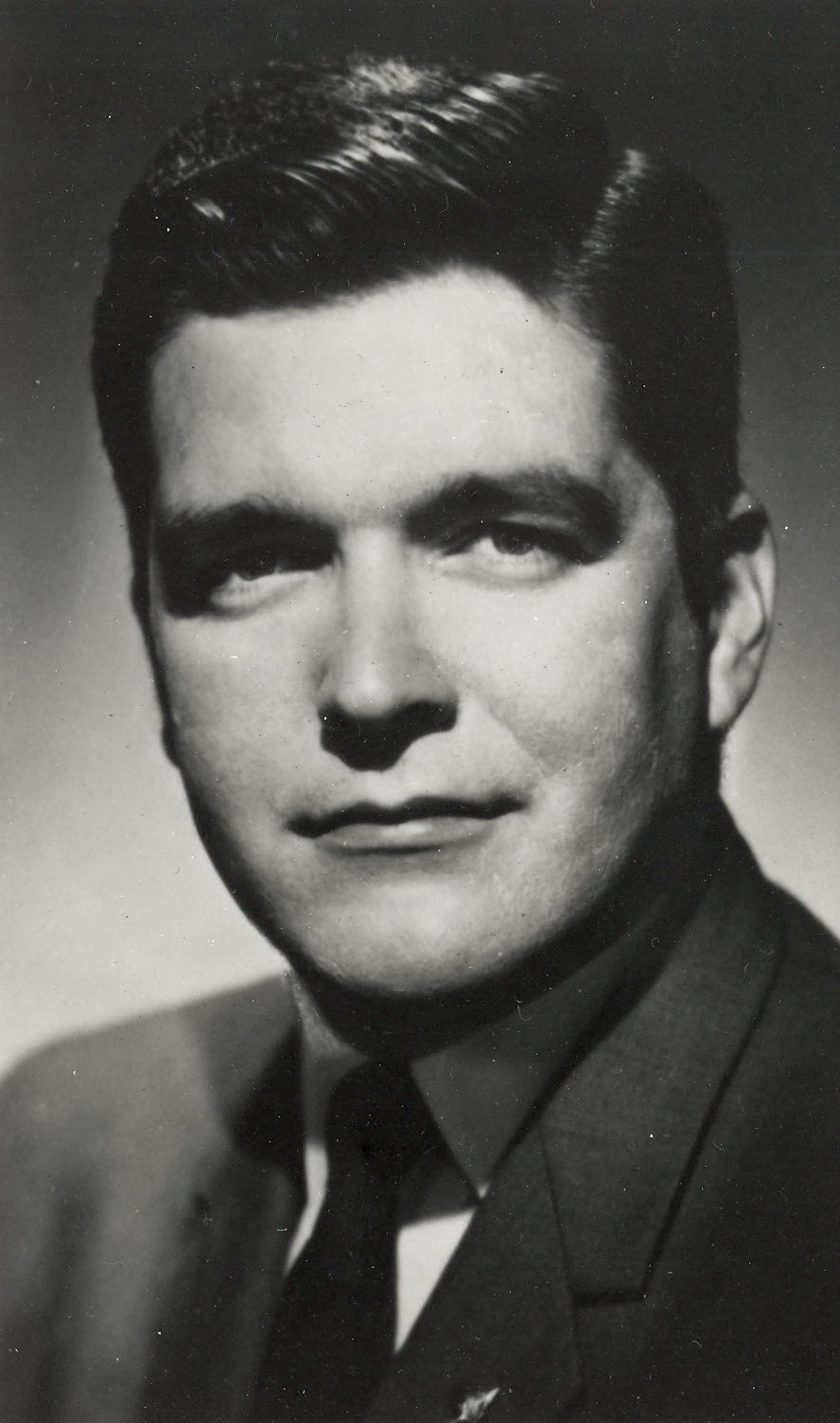
Congressman Larry McDonald, who was aboard Flight 007

The Boeing 747 flying as Korean Air Lines Flight 007 departed from Gate 15 of John F. Kennedy International Airport, New York City, on August 31, 1983, at 00:25 EDT (04:25 UTC), bound for Kimpo International Airport in Gangseo District, Seoul, 35 minutes behind its scheduled departure time of 23:50 EDT, August 30 (03:50 UTC, August 31). The flight was carrying 246 passengers and 23 crew members. After refuelling at Anchorage International Airport in Anchorage, the aircraft departed for Seoul at 04:00 AHDT (13:00 UTC) on August 31, 1983. This leg of the journey was piloted by Captain Chun Byung-in (45), First Officer Son Dong-hui (47), and Flight Engineer Kim Eui-dong (31). Captain Chun had a total of 10,627 flight hours, including 6,618 hours in the 747. First Officer Son had a total of 8,917 flight hours, including 3,411 hours in the 747. Flight Engineer Kim had a total of 4,012 flight hours, including 2,614 hours on the 747.

Korean Air Lines Flight 007 had an unusually high ratio of crew to passengers, as six deadheading crew were on board. Twelve passengers occupied the upper deck, first class, while in business class almost all of the 24 seats were taken; in economy class, approximately 80 seats were empty. There were 22 children under the age of 12 years aboard. One hundred thirty passengers planned to connect to other destinations such as Tokyo, Hong Kong, and Taipei.

United States Congressman Larry McDonald from Georgia, who at the time was also the second president of the conservative John Birch Society, was on the flight. The Soviets contended former U.S. president Richard Nixon was to have been seated next to Larry McDonald on KAL 007 but that the CIA warned him not to go, according to the New York Post and Telegraph Agency of the Soviet Union (TASS); according to former Nixon aide Franklin R. Gannon, Nixon had received the offer but decided against it himself.

=== Flight deviation from assigned route ===
Less than a half-minute after taking off from Anchorage, KAL 007 was directed by air traffic control (ATC) to turn to a magnetic heading of 220°. This sharp turn, 100° to the left, was only to transition the plane from its initial heading at take-off (320° magnetic, in line with the runway it used), to bring it closer to a route known as J501, which KAL 007 was to take to Bethel. Approximately 90 seconds later, ATC directed the flight to "proceed direct Bethel when able." In response, the plane immediately began a slight turn to the right, to align it with route J501, and less than a minute later (3 minutes after take-off) was on a magnetic heading of approximately 245°, roughly toward Bethel.

Upon KAL 007's arrival over Bethel, its flight plan called for it to take the northernmost of five 80-kilometre-wide (50 mi) airways, known as the NOPAC (North Pacific) routes, that bridge the American and Japanese coasts. That particular airway, R20 (Romeo Two Zero), passes within 20 miles (32 km) from what was then Soviet airspace off the coast of the Kamchatka Peninsula.

The lateral navigation half of the autopilot system of the 747-200 has four basic control modes: HEADING, VOR/LOC, ILS, and INS. The HEADING mode maintained a constant magnetic course selected by the pilot. The VOR/LOC mode maintained the plane on a specific course, transmitted from a VOR (VHF omnidirectional range, a type of short-range radio signal transmitted from ground beacons) or Localizer (LOC) beacon selected by the pilot. The ILS (instrument landing system) mode caused the plane to track both vertical and lateral course beacons, which led to a specific runway selected by the pilot. The INS (inertial navigation system) mode maintained the plane on lateral course lines between selected flight plan waypoints programmed into the INS computer.

When the INS navigation systems were properly programmed with the filed flight plan waypoints, the pilot could turn the autopilot mode selector switch to the INS position and the plane would then automatically track the programmed INS course line, provided the plane was headed in the proper direction and within 7.5 nautical miles (13.9 km) of that course line. If, however, the plane was more than 7.5 nautical miles (13.9 km) from the flight-planned course line when the pilot turned the autopilot mode selector from HEADING to INS, the plane would continue to track the heading selected in HEADING mode as long as the actual position of the plane was more than 7.5 nautical miles (13.9 km) from the programmed INS course line. The autopilot computer software commanded the INS mode to remain in the "armed" condition until the plane had moved to a position less than 7.5 nautical miles (13.9 km) from the desired course line. Once that happened, the INS mode would change from "armed" to "capture" and the plane would track the flight-planned course from then on.

The HEADING mode of the autopilot would normally be engaged sometime after takeoff to follow vectors from ATC, and then after receiving appropriate ATC clearance, to guide the plane to intercept the desired INS course line.

The Anchorage VOR beacon was not operational at the time, as it was undergoing maintenance. The crew received a NOTAM (Notice to Airmen) of this fact, which was not seen as a problem, as the captain could still check his position at the next VORTAC beacon at Bethel, 346 nautical miles (641 km) away. The aircraft was required to maintain the assigned heading of 220 degrees until it could receive the signals from Bethel, then it could fly direct to Bethel, as instructed by ATC, by centering the VOR "to" course deviation indicator (CDI) and then engaging the autopilot in the VOR/LOC mode. Then, when over the Bethel beacon, the flight could start using INS mode to follow the waypoints that make up route Romeo-20 around the coast of the U.S.S.R. to Seoul. The INS mode was necessary for this route since after Bethel the plane would be mostly out of range from VOR stations.

A simplified CIA map showing divergence of planned and actual flight paths

At about 10 minutes after take-off, flying on a heading of 245 degrees, KAL 007 began to deviate to the right (north) of its assigned route to Bethel and continued to fly on this constant heading for the next five and a half hours.

International Civil Aviation Organization (ICAO) simulation and analysis of the flight data recorder determined that this deviation was probably caused by the aircraft's autopilot system operating in HEADING mode, after the point that it should have been switched to the INS mode. According to the ICAO, the autopilot was not operating in the INS mode either because the crew did not switch the autopilot to the INS mode (as they should have shortly after Cairn Mountain), or they did select the INS mode, but the computer did not transition from "armed" to "capture" condition because the aircraft had already deviated off track by more than the 7.5-nautical-mile (13.9 km) tolerance permitted by the inertial navigation computer. Whatever the reason, the autopilot remained in HEADING mode, and the problem was not detected by the crew.

At 27 minutes after KAL 007's take-off, civilian radar at Kenai, located about 50 nautical miles (90 km) southwest of Anchorage and with coverage of up to 175 nautical miles (320 km), showed it passing near Cairn Mountain, about 160 nautical miles (300 km) west of Anchorage. It also showed that the aircraft by then was already off course—about 6 nautical miles (11 km) north of its expected route to Bethel.

Later, at 13:49 UTC (49 minutes after take-off), KAL 007 reported that it had reached its Bethel waypoint, about 346 nautical miles (641 km) west of Anchorage. But traces from military radar at King Salmon, United States, showed that the aircraft then was actually about 12 nautical miles (22 km) north of that location—and heading farther off course. There is no evidence to indicate that anyone with access to King Salmon radar output that night—civil air traffic controllers or military radar personnel—was aware in real-time of KAL 007's deviation and in a position to warn the aircraft. But had the aircraft been steered under INS control, as was intended, such an error would have been far greater than the INS's nominal navigational accuracy of less than 2 nautical miles (3.7 km) per hour of flight.

KAL 007's divergence prevented the aircraft from transmitting its position via shorter-range very-high-frequency radio (VHF). It therefore requested KAL 015, also en route to Seoul, to relay reports to air traffic control on its behalf. KAL 007 requested KAL 015 to relay its position three times. At 14:43 UTC, KAL 007 directly transmitted a change of estimated time of arrival for its next waypoint, NEEVA, to the international flight service station at Anchorage, but it did so over the longer range high frequency radio (HF) rather than VHF. HF transmissions can typically be heard at a greater distance than VHF, but are vulnerable to electromagnetic interference and static; VHF is clearer with less interference and is preferred by flight crews. The inability to establish direct radio communications via VHF did not alert the pilots of KAL 007 of their ever-increasing divergence and was not considered unusual by air traffic controllers. Halfway between Bethel and waypoint NABIE, KAL 007 passed through the southern portion of the North American Aerospace Defense Command buffer zone. This zone is north of Romeo 20 and off-limits to civilian aircraft.

Sometime after leaving American territorial waters, KAL Flight 007 crossed the International Date Line, where the local date shifted from August 31, 1983, to September 1, 1983.

KAL 007 continued its journey, ever-increasing its deviation—60 nautical miles (110 km) off course at waypoint NABIE, 100 nautical miles (190 km) off course at waypoint NUKKS, and 160 nautical miles (300 km) off course at waypoint NEEVA—until it reached the Kamchatka Peninsula.

Route J501 / R20 waypoint	Flight-planned coordinates	ATC	KAL 007 deviation
CAIRN MOUNTAIN	61°06.0′N 155°33.0′W	Anchorage	6 nmi (11 km)
BETHEL	60°47.1′N 161°49.3′W	Anchorage	12 nmi (22 km)
NABIE	59°18.0′N 171°45.4′W	Anchorage	60 nmi (110 km)
NUKKS	57°15.1′N 179°44.3′E	Anchorage	100 nmi (190 km)
NEEVA	54°40.7′N 172°11.8′E	Anchorage	160 nmi (300 km)
NINNO	52°21.5′N 165°22.8′E	Anchorage	
NIPPI	49°41.9′N 159°19.3′E	Anchorage/Tokyo	180 mi (290 km)
NYTIM	46°11.9′N 153°00.5′E	Tokyo	500 nmi (930 km) to point of impact
NOKKA	42°23.3′N 147°28.8′E	Tokyo	350 nmi (650 km) to point of impact
NOHO	40°25.0′N 145°00.0′E	Tokyo	390 nmi (720 km) to point of impact

=== Shoot-down ===
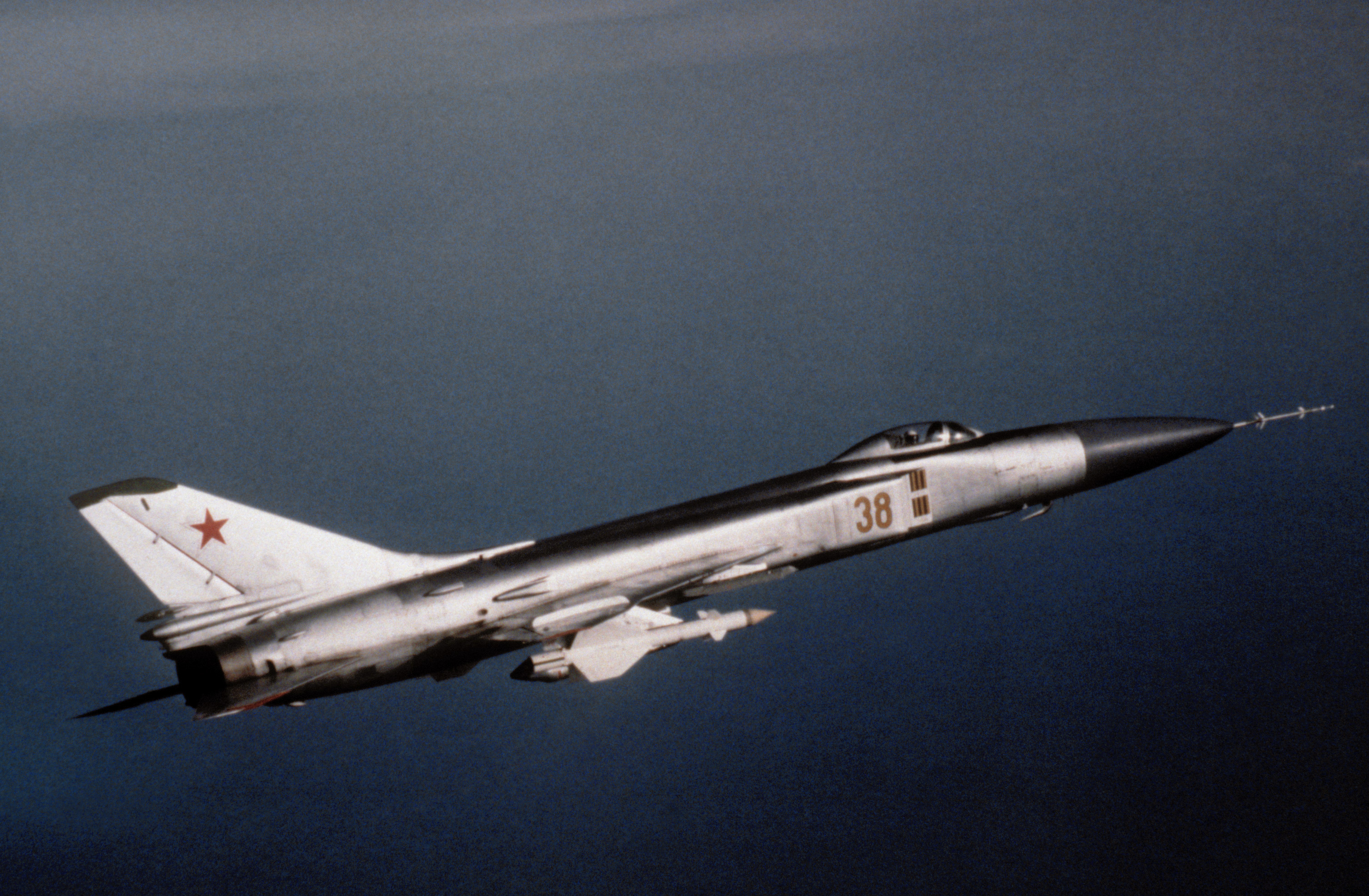
A Soviet Sukhoi Su-15 interceptor

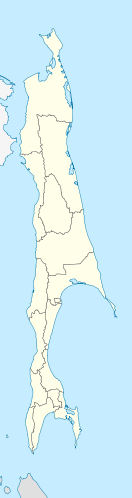
Sakhalin Island

In 1983, Cold War tensions between the United States and the Soviet Union had escalated to a level not seen since the Cuban Missile Crisis because of several factors. These included the United States' Strategic Defense Initiative, its planned deployment of the Pershing II weapon system in Europe in March and April, and FleetEx '83-1, the largest naval exercise held to date in the North Pacific. The military hierarchy of the Soviet Union (particularly the old guard led by Soviet general secretary Yuri Andropov and Minister of Defence Dmitry Ustinov) viewed these actions as bellicose and destabilizing; they were deeply suspicious of U.S. president Ronald Reagan's intentions and openly fearful he was planning a pre-emptive nuclear strike against the Soviet Union. These fears culminated in RYAN, the code name for a secret intelligence-gathering program initiated by Andropov to detect a potential nuclear sneak attack which he believed Reagan was plotting.

Aircraft from USS Midway and USS Enterprise repeatedly overflew Soviet military installations in the Kuril Islands during FleetEx '83 naval exercise (March 29 to April 17, 1983), resulting in the dismissal or reprimanding of Soviet military officials who had been unable to shoot them down. On the Soviet side, RYAN was expanded. Lastly, there was a heightened alert around the Kamchatka Peninsula at the time that KAL 007 was in the vicinity, because of a Soviet missile test at the Kura Missile Test Range that was scheduled for the same day. A United States Air Force Boeing RC-135 reconnaissance aircraft flying in the area was monitoring the missile test off the peninsula.

At 15:51 UTC, according to Soviet sources, KAL 007 entered the restricted airspace of the Kamchatka Peninsula. The buffer zone extended 200 kilometres (120 mi; 110 nmi) from Kamchatka's coast and is known as a flight information region (FIR). The 100-kilometre (62 mi; 54 nmi) radius of the buffer zone nearest to Soviet territory had the additional designation of prohibited airspace. When KAL 007 was about 130 kilometres (81 mi; 70 nmi) from the Kamchatka coast, four MiG-23 fighters were scrambled to intercept the Boeing 747.

Significant command and control problems were experienced trying to vector the fast military jets onto the 747 before they ran out of fuel. In addition, the pursuit was made more difficult, according to Soviet Air Force Captain Aleksandr Zuyev, who defected to the West in 1989, because, ten days before, Arctic gales had knocked out the key warning radar on the Kamchatka Peninsula. Furthermore, he stated that local officials responsible for repairing the radar lied to Moscow, falsely reporting that they had successfully fixed the radar. Had this radar been operational, it would have enabled an intercept of the stray airliner roughly two hours earlier with plenty of time for proper identification as a civilian aircraft. Instead, the unidentified jetliner crossed over the Kamchatka Peninsula back into international airspace over the Sea of Okhotsk without being intercepted. In his explanation to 60 Minutes, Zuyev stated: "Some people lied to Moscow, trying to save their ass."

The Commander of the Soviet Far East District Air Defense Forces, General Valeri Kamensky, was adamant that KAL 007 was to be destroyed even over neutral waters but only after positive identification showed it not to be a passenger plane. His subordinate, General Anatoly Kornukov, commander of Sokol Air Base and later to become commander of the Russian Air Force, insisted that there was no need to make positive identification as the intruder aircraft had already flown over the Kamchatka Peninsula.

General Kornukov (to Military District Headquarters-Gen. Kamensky): (5:47) "...simply destroy [it] even if it is over neutral waters? Are the orders to destroy it over neutral waters? Oh, well."
Kamensky: "We must find out, maybe it is some civilian craft or God knows who."
Kornukov: "What civilian? [It] has flown over Kamchatka! It [came] from the ocean without identification. I am giving the order to attack if it crosses the State border."

Units of the Soviet Air Defence Forces that had been tracking the South Korean aircraft for more than an hour while it entered and left Soviet airspace now classified the aircraft as a military target when it re-entered their airspace over Sakhalin. After a protracted ground-controlled interception, the three Su-15 fighters (from nearby Dolinsk-Sokol airbase) and the MiG-23 (from Smirnykh Air Base) managed to make visual contact with the Boeing. The pilot of the lead Su-15 fighter fired warning shots with its cannon, but recalled later in 1991, "I fired four bursts, more than 200 rounds. For all the good it did. After all, I was loaded with armor-piercing shells, not incendiary shells. It's doubtful whether anyone could see them."

At this point, KAL 007 contacted Tokyo Area Control Center, requesting clearance to ascend to a higher flight level for reasons of fuel economy; the request was granted, so the Boeing started to climb, gradually slowing as it exchanged speed for altitude. The decrease in speed caused the pursuing fighter to overshoot the Boeing and was interpreted by the Soviet pilot as an evasive maneuver. The order to shoot KAL 007 down was given as it was about to leave Soviet airspace for the second time. At around 18:26 UTC, under pressure from General Kornukov and ground controllers not to let the aircraft escape into international airspace, the lead fighter was able to move back into a position where it could fire two K-8 missiles at the plane.

==== Soviet pilot's recollection of shoot-down ====
In a 1991 interview with Izvestia, Major Gennadiy Osipovich, pilot of the Su-15 interceptor that shot the aircraft down, spoke about his recollections of the events leading up to the shoot-down. Contrary to official Soviet statements at the time, he recalled telling ground controllers that there were "blinking lights". He continued, saying of the 747-230B, "I saw two rows of windows and knew that this was a Boeing. I knew this was a civilian plane. But for me this meant nothing. It is easy to turn a civilian type of plane into one for military use." Osipovich also stated, "I did not tell the ground that it was a Boeing-type plane; they did not ask me."

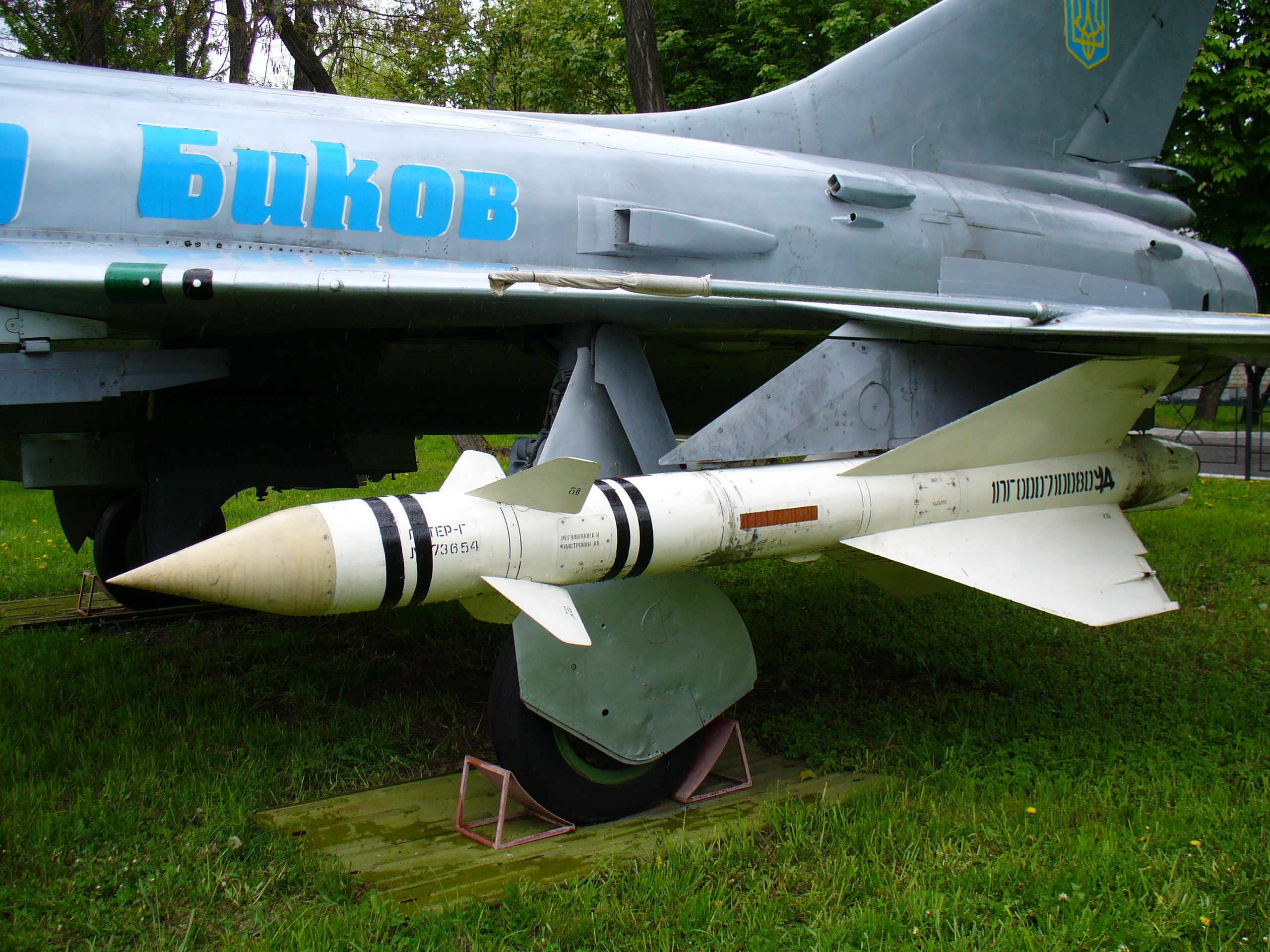
K-8 missile (the type fired at KAL 007) mounted on the wing of a Sukhoi Su-15

Commenting on the moment that KAL 007 slowed as it ascended from flight level 330 to flight level 350, and then on his maneuvering for a missile launch, Osipovich said:

They [KAL 007] quickly lowered their speed. They were flying at 400 km/h (249 mph). My speed was more than 400. I was simply unable to fly slower. In my opinion, the intruder's intentions were plain. If I did not want to go into a stall, I would be forced to overshoot them. That's exactly what happened. We had already flown over the island [Sakhalin]. It is narrow at that point, the target was about to get away... Then the ground [controller] gave the command: "Destroy the target...!" That was easy to say. But how? With shells? I had already expended 243 rounds. Ram it? I had always thought of that as poor taste. Ramming is the last resort. Just in case, I had already completed my turn and was coming down on top of him. Then, I had an idea. I dropped below him about two thousand metres (6,600 ft)... afterburners. Switched on the missiles and brought the nose up sharply. Success! I have a lock on. We shot down the plane legally ... Later we began to lie about small details: the plane was supposedly flying without running lights or strobe lights, that tracer bullets were fired, or that I had radio contact with them on the emergency frequency of 121.5 megahertz.

Osipovich died on September 23, 2015, after a protracted illness.

==== Soviet command hierarchy of shoot-down ====
The Soviet real-time military communication transcripts of the shoot-down suggest the chain of command from the top general to Major Osipovich, the Su-15 interceptor pilot who shot down KAL 007. In reverse order, they are:

- Major Gennadiy Nikolayevich Osipovich,
- Captain Titovnin, Combat Control Center – Fighter Division
- Lt. Colonel Maistrenko, Smirnykh Air Base Fighter Division Acting Chief of Staff, confirmed the shoot-down order to Titovnin.
  Titovnin: "You confirm the task?"
  Maistrenko: "Yes."
- Lt. Colonel Gerasimenko, Acting Commander, 41st Fighter Regiment.
  Gerasimenko: (to Kornukov) "Task received. Destroy target 60–65 with missile fire. Accept control of fighter from Smirnikh.
- General Anatoly Kornukov, Commander of Sokol Air Base – Sakhalin.
  Kornukov: (to Gerasimenko) "I repeat the task, Fire the missiles, Fire on target 60–65. Destroy target 60–65 ... Take control of the MiG 23 from Smirnikh, call sign 163, call sign 163. He is behind the target at the moment. Destroy the target!... Carry out the task! Destroy it!"
- General Valery Kamensky, Commander of Far East Military District Air Defense Forces.
  Kornukov: (To Kamensky) "... simply destroy [it] even if it is over neutral waters? Are the orders to destroy it over neutral waters? Oh, well."
- Army General Ivan Moiseevich Tretyak, Commander of the Far East Military District.
  "Weapons were used, weapons authorized at the highest level. Ivan Moiseevich authorized it. Hello, hello.", "Say again.", "I cannot hear you clearly now.", "He gave the order. Hello, hello, hello.", "Yes, yes.", "Ivan Moiseevich gave the order, Tretyak.", "Roger, roger.", "Weapons were used at his order."

==== Post-attack flight ====
At the time of the attack, the plane had been cruising at an altitude of about 35,000 feet (11,000 m). Tapes recovered from the airliner's cockpit voice recorder indicate that the crew was unaware that they were off course and violating Soviet airspace. Immediately after missile detonation, the airliner began a 113-second arc upward because of a damaged crossover cable between the left inboard and right outboard elevators.

At 18:26:46 UTC (03:26 Japan Time; 06:26 Sakhalin time), at the apex of the arc at altitude 38,250 feet (11,660 m), the autopilot disengaged (this was either done by the pilots, or it disengaged automatically). Now being controlled manually, the plane began to descend to 35,000 feet (11,000 m). From 18:27:01 until 18:27:09, the flight crew reported to the Tokyo Area Control Center informing that KAL 007 would "descend to 10,000" [feet; 3,000 m]. At 18:27:20, ICAO graphing of Digital Flight Data Recorder tapes showed that after a descent phase and a 10-second "nose-up", KAL 007 was leveled out at pre-missile detonation altitude of 35,000 ft (11,000 m), forward acceleration was back to pre-missile detonation rate of zero acceleration, and airspeed had returned to pre-detonation velocity.

Yaw oscillations, beginning at the time of missile detonation, continued decreasingly until the end of the 1-minute 44-second section of the tape. The Boeing did not break up, explode, or plummet immediately after the attack; it continued its gradual descent for four minutes, then leveled off at 16,424 ft (5,006 m) (18:30–18:31 UTC), rather than continuing to descend to 10,000 ft (3,000 m) as previously reported to Tokyo Area Control Center. It continued at this altitude for almost five more minutes (18:35 UTC).

The last cockpit voice recorder entry occurred at 18:27:46 while in this phase of the descent. At 18:28 UTC, the aircraft was reported turning to the north. ICAO analysis concluded that the flight crew "retained limited control" of the aircraft. However, this lasted for only five minutes. The crew then lost all control. The aircraft began to descend rapidly in spirals over Moneron Island for 2.6 miles (4.2 km). The aircraft then broke apart in mid-air and crashed into the ocean, just off the west coast of Sakhalin Island. All 269 people on board were killed. (Note: The last plotted radar position of the target was 18:35 hours at 5,000 meters." (ICAO '93, p. 53, para. 2.15.8)) The aircraft was last seen visually by Osipovich, "somehow descending slowly" over Moneron Island. The aircraft disappeared off long-range military radar at Wakkanai, Japan, at a height of 1,000 feet (300 m).

KAL 007 was probably attacked in international airspace, with a 1993 Russian report listing the location of the missile firing outside its territory at 46°46′27″N 141°32′48″E, although the intercepting pilot stated otherwise in a subsequent interview. Initial reports that the airliner had been forced to land on Sakhalin were soon proven false. One of these reports conveyed via phone by Orville Brockman, the Washington office spokesman of the Federal Aviation Administration, to the press secretary of Larry McDonald, was that the FAA in Tokyo had been informed by the Japanese Civil Aviation Bureau that "Japanese self-defense force radar confirms that the Hokkaido radar followed Air Korea to a landing in Soviet territory on the island of Sakhalinska and it is confirmed by the manifest that Congressman McDonald is on board".

A Japanese fisherman aboard 58th Chidori Maru later reported to the Japanese Maritime Safety Agency (this report was cited by ICAO analysis) that he had heard a plane at low altitude, but had not seen it. Then he heard "a loud sound followed by a bright flash of light on the horizon, then another dull sound and a less intense flash of light on the horizon" and smelled aviation fuel.

==== Soviet command response to post-detonation flight ====
Though the interceptor pilot reported to ground control, "Target destroyed", the Soviet command, from the general on down, indicated surprise and consternation at KAL 007's continued flight, and ability to regain its altitude and maneuver. This consternation continued through to KAL 007's subsequent level flight at altitude 16,424 ft (5,006 m), and then, after almost five minutes, through its spiral descent over Moneron Island.

==== Missile damage to plane ====
The following damage to the aircraft was determined by the ICAO from its analysis of the flight data recorder and cockpit voice recorder:

KAL 007 had four redundant hydraulic systems of which systems one, two, and three were damaged or destroyed. There was no evidence of damage to system four. The hydraulics provided actuation of all primary and secondary flight controls (except leading edge slats in the latter) as well as landing gear retraction, extension, gear steering, and wheel braking. Each primary flight control axis received power from all four hydraulic systems. Upon missile detonation, the jumbo jet began to experience oscillations (yawing) as the dual channel yaw damper was damaged. Yawing would not have occurred if hydraulic systems one or two were fully operational. The result is that the control column did not thrust forward after missile detonation (it should have done so as the plane was on autopilot) to bring the plane down to its former altitude of 35,000 feet (11,000 m). This failure of the autopilot to correct the rise in altitude indicates that hydraulic system number three, which operates the autopilot actuator, a system controlling the plane's elevators, was damaged or out. KAL 007's airspeed and acceleration rate both began to decrease as the plane began to climb. At twenty seconds after the missile detonation, a click was heard in the cabin, which is identified as the "automatic pilot disconnect warning" sound. Either the pilot or co-pilot had disconnected the autopilot and was manually thrusting the control column forward to bring the plane lower. Though the autopilot had been turned off, manual mode did not begin functioning for another twenty seconds. This failure of the manual system to engage upon command indicates failure in hydraulic systems one and two. With wing flaps up, "control was reduced to the right inboard aileron and the innermost of spoiler section of each side".

Contrary to Major Osipovich's statement in 1991 that he had taken off half of KAL 007's left wing, ICAO analysis found that the wing was intact: "The interceptor pilot stated that the first missile hit near the tail, while the second missile took off half the left wing of the aircraft... The interceptor's pilot's statement that the second missile took off half of the left wing was probably incorrect. The missiles were fired at a two-second interval and would have detonated at an equal interval. The first detonated at 18:26:02 UTC. The last radio transmissions from KE007 to Tokyo Radio were between 18:26:57 and 18:27:15 UTC using HF [high frequency]. The HF 1 radio aerial of the aircraft was positioned in the left wing tip suggesting that the left wing tip was intact at this time. Also, the aircraft's maneuvers after the attack did not indicate extensive damage to the left wing."

The co-pilot reported to Captain Chun twice during the flight after the missiles' detonation, "Engines normal, sir."

The first missile was radar-controlled and proximity fuzed, and detonated 50 metres (160 ft) behind the aircraft. Sending fragments forward, it either severed or unraveled the crossover cable from the left inboard elevator to the right elevator. This, with damage to one of the four hydraulic systems, caused KAL 007 to ascend from 35,000 to 38,250 feet (10,670 to 11,660 m), at which point the autopilot was disengaged.

Fragments from the proximity fuzed air-to-air missile that detonated 50 metres (160 ft) behind the aircraft, punctured the fuselage and caused rapid decompression of the pressurised cabin. The interval of 11 seconds between the sound of missile detonation picked up by the cockpit voice recorder and the sound of the alarm sounding in the cockpit enabled ICAO analysts to determine that the size of the ruptures to the pressurised fuselage was 1.75 square feet (0.163 m^{2}).

== Search and rescue ==
As a result of Cold War tensions, the search and rescue operations of the Soviet Union were not coordinated with those of the United States, South Korea, and Japan. Consequently, no information was shared, and each side endeavored to harass or obtain evidence to implicate the other. The flight data recorders were the key pieces of evidence sought by both governments, with the United States insisting that an independent observer from the ICAO be present on one of its search vessels if they were found. International boundaries are not well defined on the open sea, leading to numerous confrontations between the large number of opposing naval ships that were assembled in the area.

=== Soviet search and rescue mission to Moneron Island ===
The Soviets did not acknowledge shooting down the aircraft until September 6, five days after the flight was shot down. Eight days after the shoot-down, Marshal of the Soviet Union and Chief of General Staff Nikolai Ogarkov denied knowledge of where KAL 007 had gone down; "We could not give the precise answer about the spot where it [KAL 007] fell because we ourselves did not know the spot in the first place."

Nine years later, the Russian Federation handed over transcripts of Soviet military communications that showed that at least two documented search and rescue (SAR) missions were ordered within a half-hour of the attack, to the last Soviet-verified location of the descending jumbo jet over Moneron Island. The first search was ordered from Smirnykh Air Base in central Sakhalin at 18:47 UTC, nine minutes after KAL 007 had disappeared from Soviet radar screens and brought rescue helicopters from Khomutovo Air Base (the military unit at Yuzhno-Sakhalinsk Airport in southern Sakhalin), and Soviet Border Troops boats to the area.

The second search was ordered eight minutes later by the Deputy Commander of the Far Eastern Military District, General Strogov, and involved civilian trawlers that were in the area around Moneron. "The border guards. What ships do we now have near Moneron Island? If they are civilians, send [them] there immediately." Moneron is just 7.2 kilometres (4.5 mi) long and 5.6 kilometres (3.5 mi) wide, located 39 kilometres (24 mi) due west of Sakhalin Island at 46°15′N 141°14′E; it is the only land mass in the whole Tatar Straits.

=== Search for KAL 007 in international waters ===
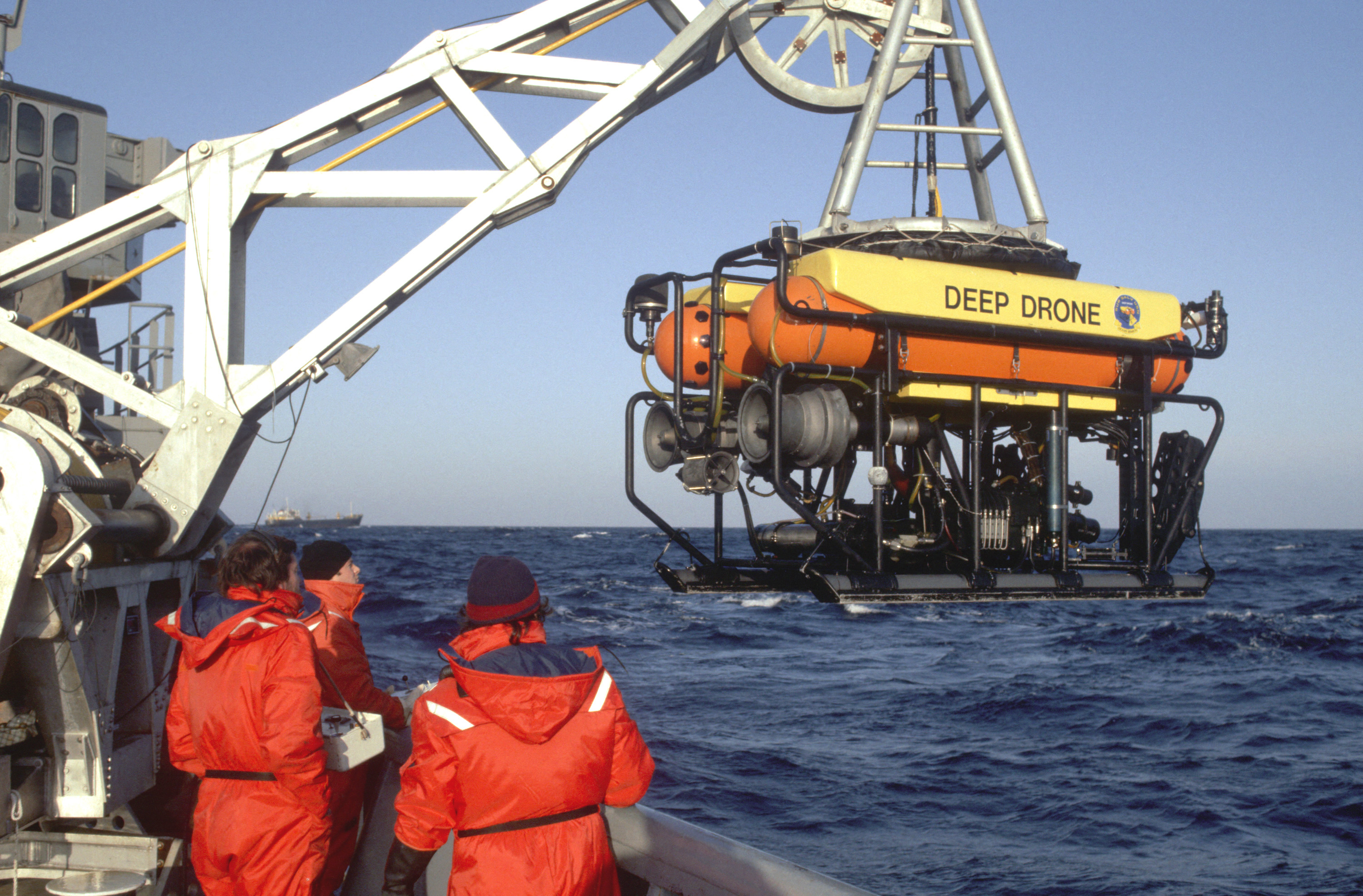
The submersible Deep Drone is deployed from the fleet tug, USNS Narragansett.

Immediately after the shoot-down, South Korea, the owner of the aircraft and therefore prime considerant for jurisdiction, designated the United States and Japan as search and salvage agents, thereby making it illegal for the Soviet Union to salvage the aircraft, providing it was found outside Soviet territorial waters. If it did so, the United States would now be legally entitled to use force against the Soviets, if necessary, to prevent retrieval of any part of the plane.

On the same day as the shoot-down, Rear Admiral William A. Cockell, Commander, Task Force 71, and a skeleton staff, taken by helicopter from Japan, embarked in USS Badger (stationed off Vladivostok at the time) on September 9 for further transfer to the destroyer USS Elliot to assume duties as Officer in Tactical Command (OTC) of the Search and Rescue (SAR) effort. A surface search began immediately and on into September 13. U.S. underwater operations began on September 14. On September 10, 1983, with no further hope of finding survivors, Task Force 71's mission was reclassified from a "Search and Rescue" (SAR) operation to a "Search and Salvage" (SAS).

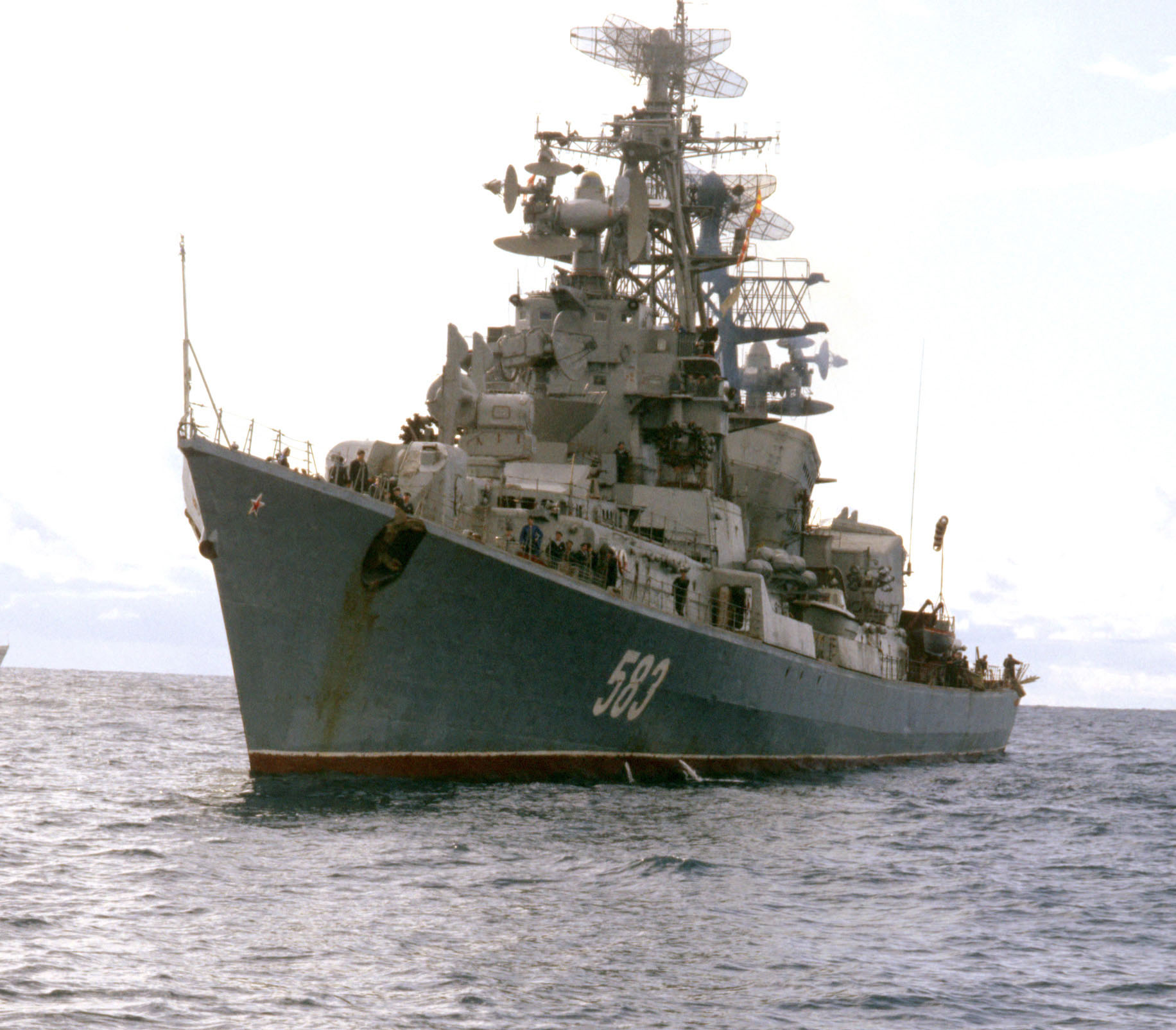
The Soviet Kashin-class destroyer Odarennyy shadows ships of Task Force 71, 7th Fleet as they conduct search operations for Korean Airlines Flight 007.

On October 17, Rear Admiral Walter T. Piotti, Jr. took command of the task force and its search and salvage mission from Rear Admiral Cockell. First to be searched was a 160-square-kilometre (62 sq mi) "high probability" area. This was unsuccessful. On October 21, Task Force 71 extended its search within coordinates encompassing, in an arc around the Soviet territorial boundaries north of Moneron Island, an area of 225 square miles (583 km^{2}), reaching to the west of Sakhalin Island. This was the "large probability" area. The search areas were outside the 12-nautical-mile (22 km) Soviet-claimed territorial boundaries. The northwesternmost point of the search touched the Soviet territorial boundary closest to the naval port of Nevelsk on Sakhalin. Nevelsk was 46 nautical miles (85 km) from Moneron. This larger search was also unsuccessful.

The vessels used in the search, for the Soviet side as well as the US side (US, South Korea, Japan) were both civilian trawlers, specially equipped for both the SAR and SAS operations, and various types of warships and support ships. The Soviet side also employed both civilian and military divers. The Soviet search, beginning on the day of the shoot-down and continuing until November 6, was confined to the 160-square-kilometre (62 sq mi) "high probability" area in international waters, and within Soviet territorial waters to the north of Moneron Island. The area within Soviet territorial waters was off-limits to the U.S., South Korean, and Japanese boats. From September 3 to 29, four ships from South Korea joined in the search.

Piotti Jr, commander of Task Force 71 of the 7th Fleet would summarize the US and allied, and then the Soviets', search and salvage operations:

Not since the search for the hydrogen bomb lost off Palomares, Spain, has the U.S. Navy undertaken a search effort of the magnitude or import of the search for the wreckage of KAL Flight 007.

Within six days of the downing of KAL 007, the Soviets had deployed six ships to the general crash site area. Over the next 8 weeks of observation by U.S. naval units this number grew to a daily average of 19 Soviet naval, naval-associated, and commercial (but undoubtedly naval-subordinated) ships in the Search and Salvage (SAS) area. The number of Soviet ships in the SAS area over this period ranged from a minimum of six to a maximum of thirty-two and included at least forty-eight different ships comprising forty different ship classes.

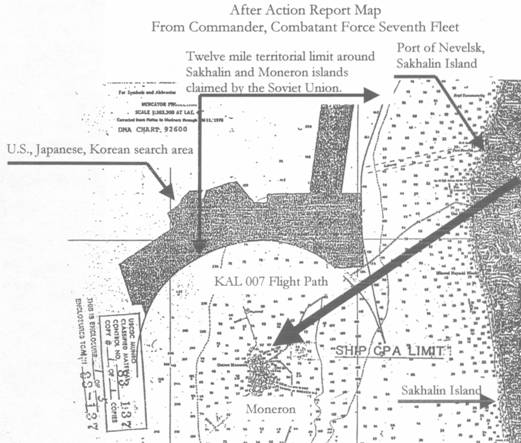
U.S. Task Force 71 After action report map of search area in international waters

These missions met with interference by the Soviets, in violation of the 1972 Incidents at Sea agreement, and included false flag and fake light signals, sending an armed boarding party to threaten to board a U.S.-chartered Japanese auxiliary vessel (blocked by U.S. warship interposition), interfering with a helicopter coming off USS Elliot (Sept. 7), attempted ramming of rigs used by the South Koreans in their quadrant search, hazardous maneuvering of Gavril Sarychev and near-collision with the USS Callaghan (September 15, 18), removing U.S. sonars, setting false pingers in deep international waters, sending Backfire bombers armed with air-to-surface nuclear-armed missiles to threaten U.S. naval units, criss-crossing in front of U.S. combatant vessels (October 26), cutting and attempted cutting of moorings of Japanese auxiliary vessels, particularly Kaiko Maru III, and radar lock-ons by a Soviet Kara-class cruiser, Petropavlovsk, and a Kashin-class destroyer, Odarennyy, targeting U.S. naval ships and the U.S. Coast Guard cutter USCGC Douglas Munro, USS Towers, escorting USS Conserver, experienced all of the above interference and was involved in a near-collision with Odarennyy (September 23–27).

According to the ICAO: "The location of the main wreckage was not determined... the approximate position was 46°34′N 141°17′E, which was in international waters." This point is about 66 kilometres (41 mi) from Moneron Island, about 72 kilometres (45 mi) from the shore of Sakhalin and 53 kilometres (33 mi) from the point of attack.

Piotti Jr, commander of Task Force 71 of 7th Fleet, believed the search for KAL 007 in international waters to have been a search in the wrong place and assessed:

Had TF [task force] 71 been permitted to search without restriction imposed by claimed territorial waters, the aircraft stood a good chance of having been found. No wreckage of KAL 007 was found. However, the operation established, with a 95% or above confidence level, that the wreckage, or any significant portion of the aircraft, does not lie within the probability area outside the 12 nautical mile area claimed by the Soviets as their territorial limit.

At a hearing of the ICAO on September 15, 1983, J. Lynn Helms, the head of the Federal Aviation Administration, stated: "The USSR has refused to permit search and rescue units from other countries to enter Soviet territorial waters to search for the remains of KAL 007. Moreover, the Soviet Union has blocked access to the likely crash site and has refused to cooperate with other interested parties, to ensure prompt recovery of all technical equipment, wreckage, and other material."

== Human remains and artifacts ==
=== Surface finds ===
No body parts were recovered by the Soviet search team from the surface of the sea in their territorial waters, though they would later turn over clothes and shoes to a joint U.S.–Japanese delegation at Nevelsk on Sakhalin. On Monday, September 26, 1983, a delegation of seven Japanese and U.S. officials arriving aboard the Japanese patrol boat Tsugaru, had met a six-man Soviet delegation at the port of Nevelsk on Sakhalin Island. KGB Major General A. I. Romanenko, the Commander of the Sakhalin and Kuril Islands frontier guard, headed the Soviet delegation. Romanenko handed over to the U.S. and the Japanese, among other things, single and paired footwear. With footwear that the Japanese also retrieved, the total came to 213 men's, women's, and children's dress shoes, sandals, and sports shoes. The Soviets indicated these items were all that they had retrieved floating or on the shores of Sakhalin and Moneron islands.

Family members of KAL 007 passengers later stated that these shoes were worn by their loved ones for the flight. Sonia Munder had no difficulty recognizing the sneakers of her children, one from Christian, age 14, and one from Lisi, age 17, by the intricate way her children laced them. Another mother says, "I recognized them just like that. You see, there are all kinds of inconspicuous marks that strangers do not notice. This is how I recognized them. My daughter loved to wear them."

Another mother, Nan Oldham, identified her son John's sneakers from a photo in Life magazine of 55 of the 213 shoes—apparently a random array on display those first days at Chitose Air Force Base in Japan. "We saw photos of his shoes in a magazine," says Oldham, "We followed up through KAL and a few weeks later, a package arrived. His shoes were inside: size 11 sneakers with cream white paint." John Oldham had taken his seat in row 31 of KAL 007 wearing those cream white paint-spattered sneakers.

Nothing was found by the joint U.S.–Japanese–South Korean search and rescue/salvage operations in international waters at the designated crash site or within the 225-square-nautical-mile (770 km^{2}) search area.

=== Hokkaido finds ===
Eight days after the shoot-down, human remains and other types of objects appeared on the north shore of Hokkaido, Japan. Hokkaido is about 50 kilometres (31 mi) below the southern tip of Sakhalin across the La Pérouse Strait (the southern tip of Sakhalin is 56 kilometres (35 mi) from Moneron Island which is west of Sakhalin). The ICAO concluded that these bodies, body parts, and objects were carried from Soviet waters to the shores of Hokkaido by the southerly current west of Sakhalin Island. All currents of the Strait of Tartary relevant to Moneron Island flow to the north, except this southerly current between Moneron Island and Sakhalin Island.

These human remains, including body parts, tissues, and two partial torsos, totaled 13. All were unidentifiable, but one partial torso was that of a Caucasian woman as indicated by auburn hair on a partial skull, and one partial body was of an Asian child (with glass embedded). There was no luggage recovered. Of the non-human remains that the Japanese recovered were various items including dentures, newspapers, seats, books, eight KAL paper cups, shoes, sandals, sneakers, a camera case, a "please fasten seat belt" sign, an oxygen mask, a handbag, a bottle of dishwashing fluid, several blouses, an identity card belonging to 25-year-old passenger Mary Jane Hendrie of Sault Ste. Marie, Ontario, Canada, and the business cards of passengers Kathy Brown-Spier and Mason Chang. These items generally came from the passenger cabin of the aircraft. None of the items found generally came from the cargo hold of the plane, such as suitcases, packing boxes, industrial machinery, instruments, and sports equipment.

=== Russian diver reports ===
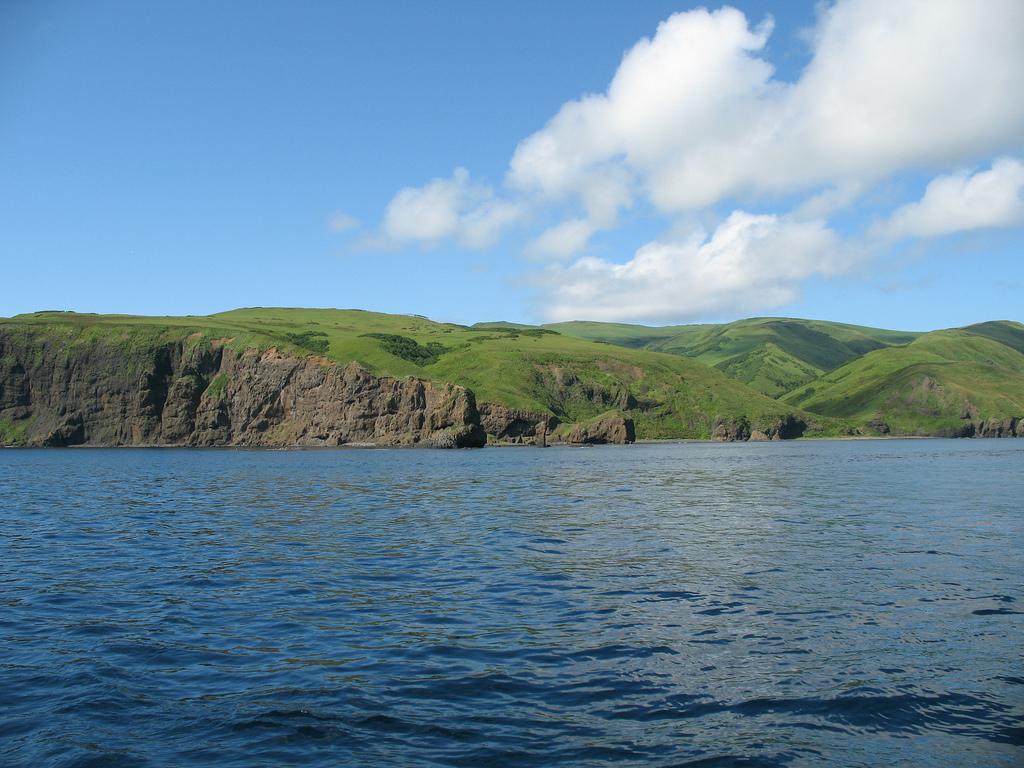
Moneron Island

In 1991, after the dissolution of the Soviet Union, the Russian newspaper Izvestia published a series of interviews with Soviet military personnel who had been involved in salvage operations to find and recover parts of the aircraft. After three days of searching using trawlers, side-scan sonar, and diving bells, Soviet searchers located the aircraft wreckage at a depth of 174 metres (571 ft) near Moneron Island. Since no human remains or luggage were found on the surface in the impact area, the divers expected to find the remains of passengers who had been trapped in the submerged wreckage of the aircraft on the seabed. When they visited the site two weeks after the shoot-down, they found that the wreckage was in small pieces, and found no bodies:

I had the idea that it would be intact. Well, perhaps a little banged up... The divers would go inside the aircraft and see everything there was to see. It was completely demolished, scattered about like kindling. The largest things we saw were the especially strong braces—they were about one and a half or two meters long and 50–60 centimeters wide. As for the rest—broken into tiny pieces...

According to Izvestia, the divers had only ten encounters with passenger remains (tissues and body parts) in the debris area, including one partial torso.

Tinro ll submersible Captain Mikhail Igorevich Girs' diary: Submergence 10 October. Aircraft pieces, wing spars, pieces of aircraft skin, wiring, and clothing. But—no people. The impression is that all of this has been dragged here by a trawl rather than falling down from the sky...

Some civilian divers, whose first dive was on September 15, two weeks after the shoot-down, state that Soviet military divers and trawls had been at work before them:

Diver Vyacheslav Popov: "As we learned then, before us the trawlers had done some 'work' in the designated quadrant. It is hard to understand what sense the military saw in the trawling operation. First, drag everything haphazardly around the bottom by the trawls, and then send in the submersibles?...It is clear that things should have been done in the reverse order."

ICAO also interviewed a number of these divers for its 1993 report: "In addition to the scraps of metal, they observed personal items, such as clothing, documents, and wallets. Although some evidence of human remains was noticed by the divers, they found no bodies."

== Political events ==
=== Initial Soviet denial ===
General Secretary Yuri Andropov, on the advice of Defense Minister Dmitriy Ustinov, but against the advice of the Foreign Ministry, initially decided not to make any admission of downing the airliner, on the premise that no one would find out or be able to prove otherwise. Consequently the TASS news agency reported twelve hours after the shoot-down only that an unidentified aircraft, flying without lights, had been intercepted by Soviet fighters after it violated Soviet airspace over Sakhalin. The aircraft had allegedly failed to respond to warnings and "continued its flight toward the Sea of Japan". Some commentators believe that the inept manner in which the political events were handled by the Soviet government was affected by the failing health of Andropov, who was permanently hospitalised in late September or early October 1983 (Andropov died the following February).

In a 2015 interview Igor Kirillov, the senior Soviet news anchor said that he was initially given a printed TASS report to announce over the news on September 1, which included an "open and honest" admission that the plane was shot down by mistake (a wrong judgment call by the Far Eastern Air Defence Command). However, at the moment the opening credits of the Vremya evening news programme rolled in, an editor ran in and snatched the sheet of paper from his hand, handing him another TASS report which was "completely opposite" to the first one and to the truth.

=== U.S. reaction and further developments ===
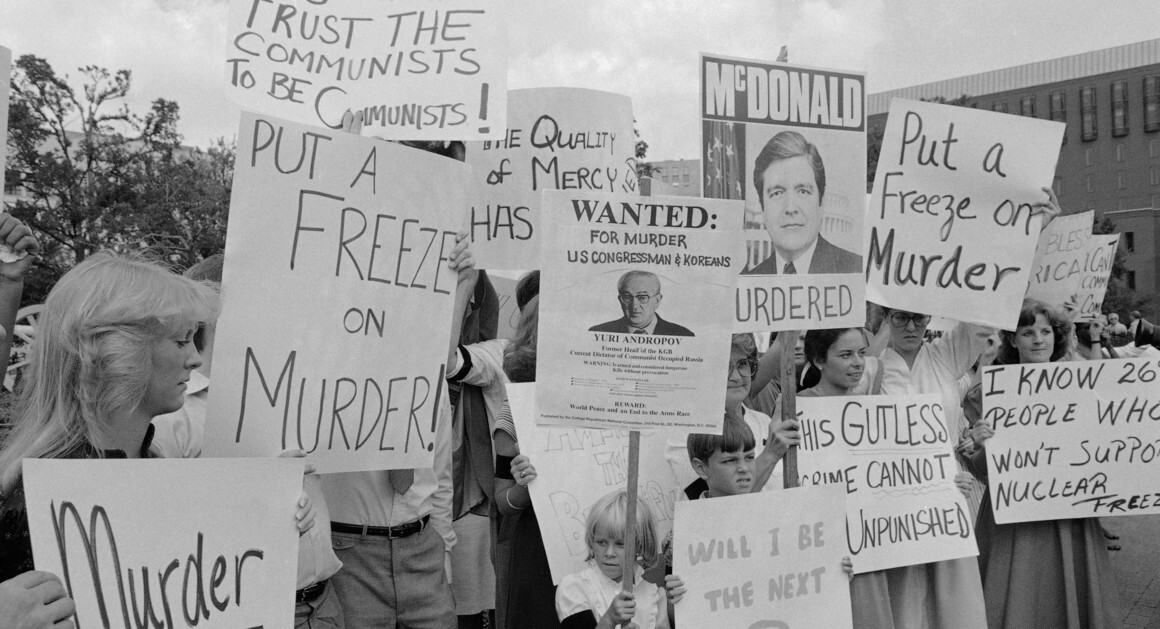
Demonstrators near the White House protest the Soviet shoot-down of KAL 007 (September 2, 1983)

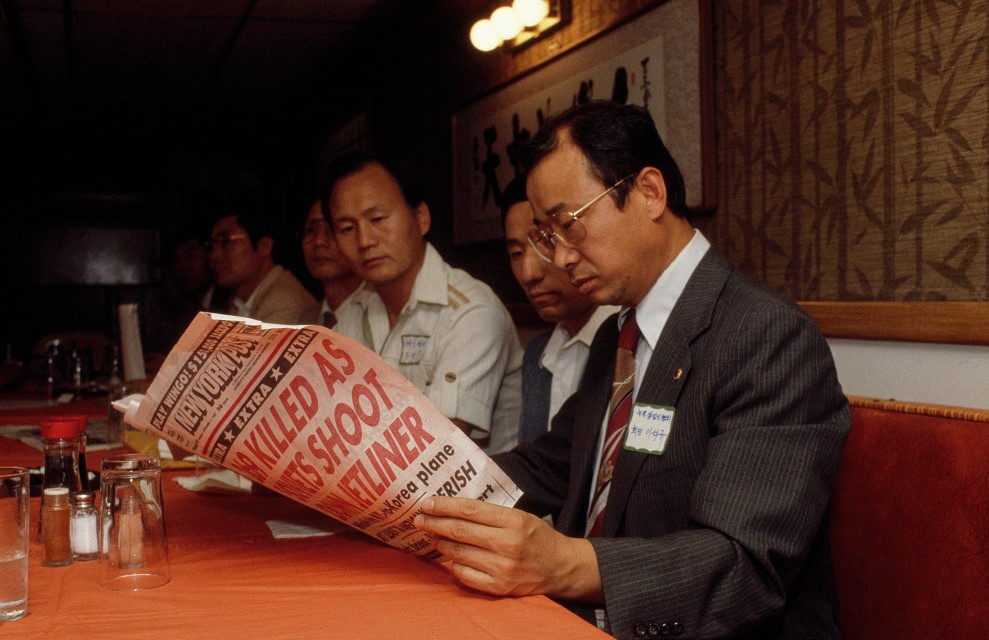
Korean Americans in New York reading the news about the shootdown (September 1, 1983)

The shoot-down happened at a very tense time in U.S.–Soviet relations during the Cold War. The U.S. adopted a strategy of releasing a substantial amount of hitherto highly classified intelligence information in order to exploit a major propaganda advantage over the Soviet Union.

Six hours after the plane was downed, the South Korean government announced that the plane had merely been forced to land abruptly by the Soviets and that all passengers and crew were safe. U.S. secretary of state George P. Shultz held a press conference about the incident at 10:45 on September 1, during which he divulged some details of intercepted Soviet communications and denounced the actions of the Soviet Union.

On September 5, 1983, President Reagan condemned the shooting down of the airplane as the "Korean airline massacre", a "crime against humanity [that] must never be forgotten" and an "act of barbarism... [and] inhuman brutality". The following day, the U.S. ambassador to the UN Jeane Kirkpatrick delivered an audio-visual presentation in the United Nations Security Council, using audio tapes of the Soviet pilots' radio conversations and a map of Flight 007's path in depicting its shooting down. Following this presentation, TASS acknowledged for the first time that the aircraft had indeed been shot down after warnings were ignored. The Soviets challenged many of the facts presented by the U.S. and revealed the previously unknown presence of a USAF RC-135 surveillance aircraft whose path had crossed that of KAL 007.

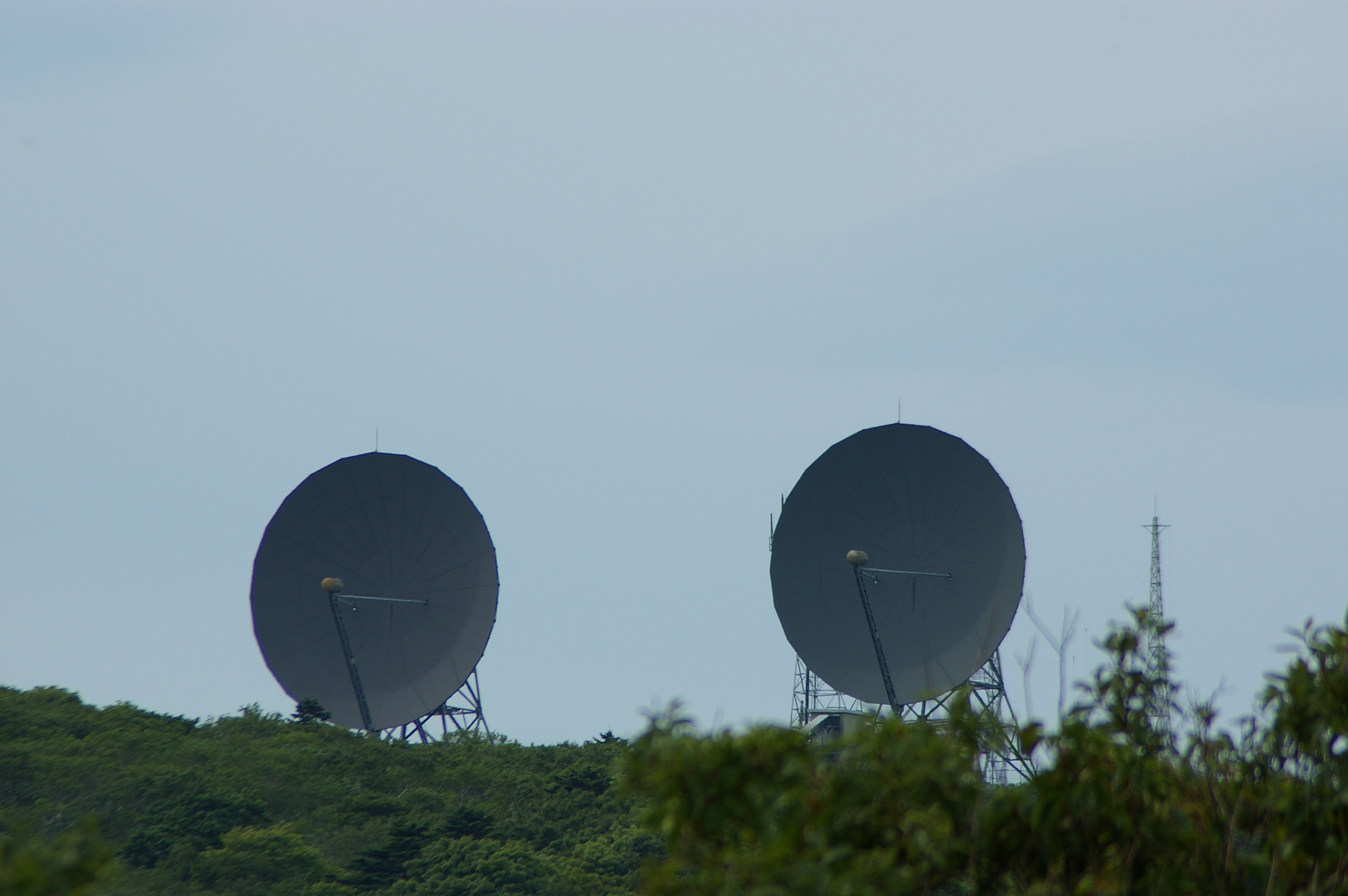
Japanese listening post at Wakkanai

On September 7, Japan and the United States jointly released a transcript of Soviet communications, intercepted by the listening post at Wakkanai, to an emergency session of the United Nations Security Council. Reagan issued a National Security Directive stating that the Soviets were not to be let off the hook, and initiating "a major diplomatic effort to keep international and domestic attention focused on the Soviet action". The move was seen by the Soviet leadership as confirmation of the West's bad intentions.

A high-level U.S.–Soviet summit, the first in nearly a year, was scheduled for September 8, 1983, in Madrid. The Shultz–Gromyko meeting went ahead but was overshadowed by the KAL 007 events. It ended acrimoniously, with Shultz stating: "Foreign Minister Gromyko's response to me today was even more unsatisfactory than the response he gave in public yesterday. I find it totally unacceptable." Reagan ordered additional restrictions on Aeroflot Soviet Airlines, including the closing of Aeroflot ticket offices in the United States. Reagan had previously set in motion restrictions on Aeroflot flying routes to and from the United States which took effect in January 1982.

An emergency session of the ICAO was held in Montreal, Canada. On September 12, 1983, the Soviet Union used its veto to block a United Nations resolution condemning it for shooting down the aircraft.

Shortly after the Soviet Union shot down KAL 007, the Port Authority of New York and New Jersey, operating the commercial airports around New York City, denied Soviet aircraft landing rights, in violation of the United Nations Charter that required the host nation to allow all member countries access to the UN. In reaction, TASS and some at the UN raised the question of whether the UN should move its headquarters from the United States. Charles Lichenstein, acting U.S. permanent representative to the UN under Ambassador Kirkpatrick, responded, "We will put no impediment in your way. The members of the U.S. mission to the United Nations will be down at the dockside waving you a fond farewell as you sail off into the sunset." Administration officials were quick to announce that Lichenstein was speaking only for himself.

In the Cold War context of Operation RYAN, the Strategic Defence Initiative, Pershing II missile deployment in Europe, and the upcoming Exercise Able Archer, the Soviet Government perceived the incident with the South Korean airliner to be a portent of war. The Soviet hierarchy took the official line that KAL Flight 007 was on a spy mission, as it "flew deep into Soviet territory for several hundred kilometres [miles], without responding to signals and disobeying the orders of interceptor fighter planes". They claimed its purpose was to probe the air defences of highly sensitive Soviet military sites in the Kamchatka Peninsula and Sakhalin Island. The Soviet government expressed regret over the loss of life, but offered no apology and did not respond to demands for compensation. Instead, the Soviet Union blamed the CIA for this "criminal, provocative act".

In 1991, political scientist Robert Entman issued a comparative study of the KAL 007 event and the 1988 shooting down of Iran Air Flight 655 by a U.S. warship. Entman stated that in the former case, "the angle taken by the US media emphasised the moral bankruptcy and guilt of the perpetrating nation", while in the latter, "the frame de-emphasised guilt and focused on the complex problems of operating military high technology".

== Investigations ==
=== NTSB ===
Since the aircraft had departed from U.S. soil and U.S. nationals had died in the incident, the National Transportation Safety Board (NTSB) was legally required to investigate. On the morning of September 1, the NTSB chief in Alaska, James Michelangelo, received an order from the NTSB in Washington at the behest of the State Department requiring all documents relating to the NTSB investigation to be sent to Washington and notifying him that the State Department would now conduct the investigation.

The U.S. State Department, after closing the NTSB investigation on the grounds that it was not an accident, opened an International Civil Aviation Organization (ICAO) investigation. Commentators point out that this action only hampered the investigation, and that in deferring the investigation to the ICAO, the Reagan administration effectively precluded any politically or militarily sensitive information from being subpoenaed that might have embarrassed the administration or contradicted its version of events. Unlike the NTSB, ICAO can't subpoena persons or documents and is dependent on the governments involved—in this incident, the United States, the Soviet Union, Japan, and South Korea—to supply evidence voluntarily.

=== Initial ICAO investigation (1983) ===
The International Civil Aviation Organization (ICAO) had only one experience of investigation of an air disaster before the KAL 007 shoot-down. This was the incident of February 21, 1973, when Libyan Arab Airlines Flight 114 was shot down by Israeli F-4 jets over the Sinai Peninsula. ICAO convention required the state in whose territory the incident had taken place (the Soviet Union) to conduct an investigation together with the country of registration (South Korea), the country whose air traffic control the aircraft was flying under (Japan), as well as the country of the aircraft's manufacturer (US).

The ICAO investigation, led by Caj Frostell, did not have the authority to compel the states involved to hand over evidence, instead having to rely on what they voluntarily submitted. Consequently, the investigation did not have access to sensitive evidence such as radar data, intercepts, ATC tapes, or the Flight Data Recorder (FDR) and Cockpit Voice Recorder (CVR) (whose discovery the U.S.S.R. had kept secret). A number of simulations were conducted with the assistance of Boeing and Litton (the manufacturer of the navigation system).

The ICAO released their report on December 2, 1983, which concluded that the violation of Soviet airspace was accidental. One of two explanations for the aircraft's deviation was that the autopilot had remained in HEADING hold instead of INS mode after departing Anchorage. They postulated that this inflight navigational error was caused by either the crew's failure to select INS mode or the inertial navigation not activating when selected because the aircraft was already too far off track. It was determined that the crew did not notice this error or subsequently perform navigational checks, which would have revealed that the aircraft was diverging further and further from its assigned route. This was later deemed to be caused by a "lack of situational awareness and flight deck coordination".

The report included a statement by the Soviet government claiming "no remains of the victims, the instruments or their components or the flight recorders have so far been discovered". This statement was subsequently shown to be untrue by Boris Yeltsin's release in 1993 of a November 1983 memo from KGB head Viktor Chebrikov and Defence Minister Dmitriy Ustinov to Yuri Andropov. This memo stated, "In the third decade of October this year the equipment in question (the recorder of in-flight parameters and the recorder of voice communications by the flight crew with ground air traffic surveillance stations and between themselves) was brought aboard a search vessel and forwarded to Moscow by air for decoding and translation at the Air Force Scientific Research Institute." The Soviet government statement would further be contradicted by Soviet civilian divers who later recalled that they viewed the wreckage of the aircraft on the bottom of the sea for the first time on September 15, two weeks after the plane had been shot down.

Following the publication of the report, the ICAO adopted a resolution condemning the Soviet Union for the attack. Furthermore, the report led to a unanimous amendment in May 1984—though not coming into force until October 1, 1998—to the Convention on International Civil Aviation that defined the use of force against civilian airliners in more detail. The amendment to section 3(d) reads in part: "The contracting States recognize that every State must refrain from resorting to the use of weapons against civil aircraft in flight and that, in case of interception, the lives of persons on board and the safety of aircraft must not be endangered."

=== U.S. Air Force radar data ===
It is customary for the Air Force to impound radar trackings involving possible litigation in cases of aviation accidents. In the civil litigation for damages, the United States Department of Justice explained that the tapes from the Air Force radar installation at King Salmon, United States, pertinent to KAL 007's flight in the Bethel area had been destroyed and could therefore not be supplied to the plaintiffs. At first Justice Department lawyer Jan Van Flatern stated that they were destroyed 15 days after the shoot-down. Later, he said he had "misspoken" and changed the time of destruction to 30 hours after the event. A Pentagon spokesman concurred, saying that the tapes are recycled for re-use from 24–30 hours afterward; the fate of KAL 007 was known inside this timeframe.

=== Interim developments ===
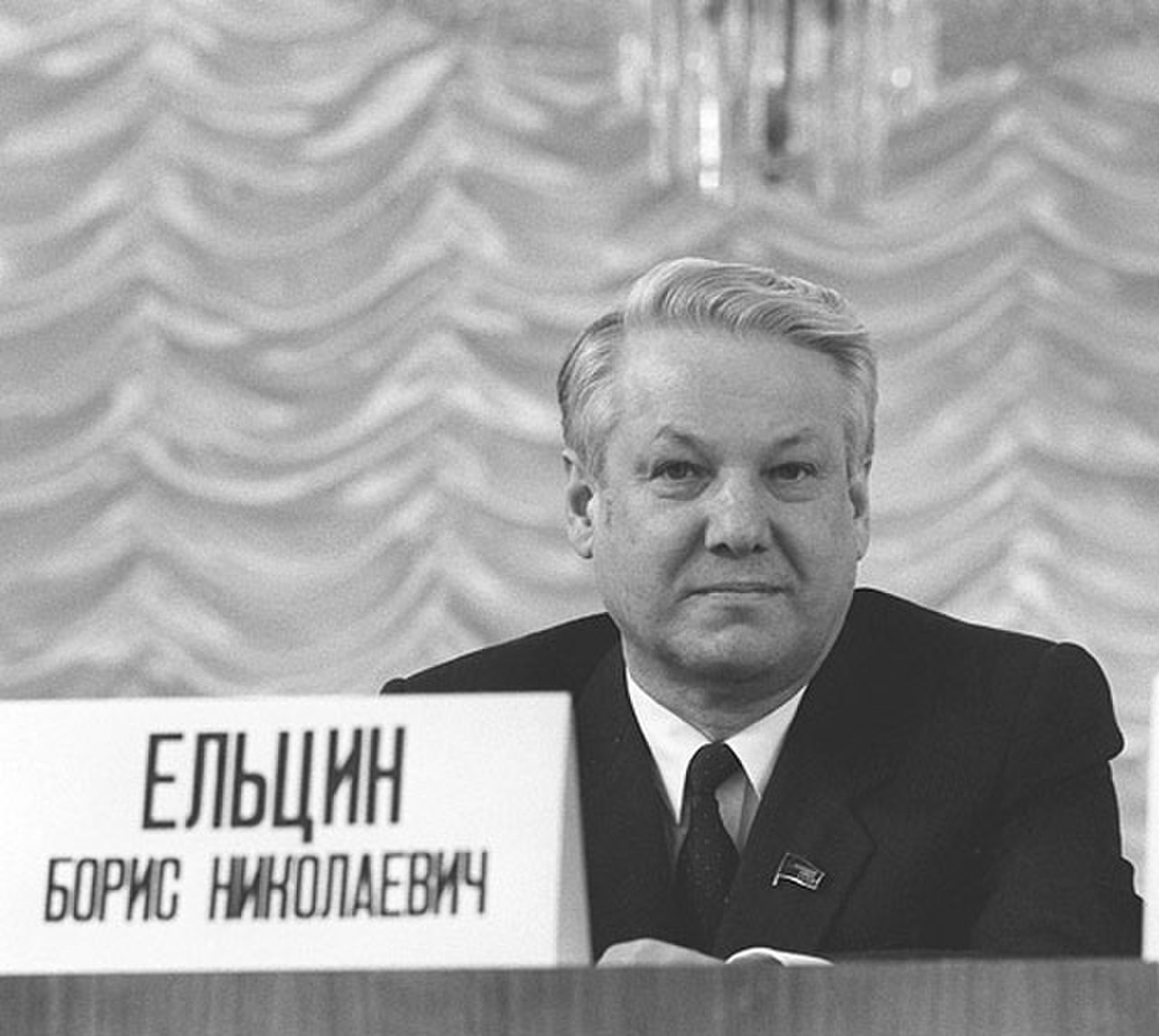
Boris Yeltsin

Hans Ephraimson-Abt, whose daughter Alice Ephraimson-Abt had died on the flight, chaired the American Association for Families of KAL 007 Victims. He single-handedly pursued three U.S. administrations for answers about the flight, flying to Washington 250 times and meeting with 149 State Department officials. Following the dissolution of the U.S.S.R., Ephraimson-Abt persuaded U.S. senators Ted Kennedy, Sam Nunn, Carl Levin, and Bill Bradley to write to the Soviet president, Mikhail Gorbachev requesting information about the flight.

Glasnost reforms in the same year brought about a relaxation of press censorship; consequently reports started to appear in the Soviet press suggesting that the Soviet military knew the location of the wreckage and possessed the flight recorders. On December 10, 1991, Senator Jesse Helms of the Committee on Foreign Relations, wrote to Boris Yeltsin requesting information concerning the survival of passengers and crew of KAL 007 including the fate of Congressman Larry McDonald.

On June 17, 1992, President Yeltsin revealed that after the 1991 failed coup attempt, concerted attempts were made to locate Soviet-era documents relating to KAL 007. He mentioned the discovery of "a memorandum from K.G.B. to the Central Committee of the Communist Party," stating that a tragedy had taken place and adding that there are documents "which would clarify the entire picture." Yeltsin said the memo continued to say that "these documents are so well concealed that it is doubtful that our children will be able to find them." On September 11, 1992, Yeltsin officially acknowledged the existence of the recorders and promised to give the South Korean government a transcript of the flight recorder contents as found in KGB files.

In October 1992, Hans Ephraimson-Abt led a delegation of families and U.S. State Department officials to Moscow at the invitation of President Yeltsin. During a state ceremony at St. Catherine's Hall in the Kremlin, the KAL family delegation was handed a portfolio containing partial transcripts of the KAL 007 cockpit voice recorder, translated into Russian, and documents of the Politburo pertaining to the tragedy.

During an official visit to Seoul in November 1992 to improve bilateral relations, President Yeltsin handed the two recorder containers to Korean president Roh Tae-woo, but not the tapes themselves. The following month, the ICAO voted to reopen the KAL 007 investigations in order to take the newly released information into account. The tapes were handed to ICAO in Paris on January 8, 1993. Also handed over at the same time were tapes of the ground-to-air communications of the Soviet military. The tapes were transcribed by the Bureau of Enquiry and Analysis for Civil Aviation Safety (BEA) in Paris in the presence of representatives from Japan, the Russian Federation, South Korea, and the United States.

A 1993 official enquiry by the Russian Federation absolved the Soviet hierarchy of blame, determining that the incident was a case of mistaken identity. On May 28, 1993, the ICAO presented its second report to the Secretary-General of the United Nations.

==== Soviet memoranda ====
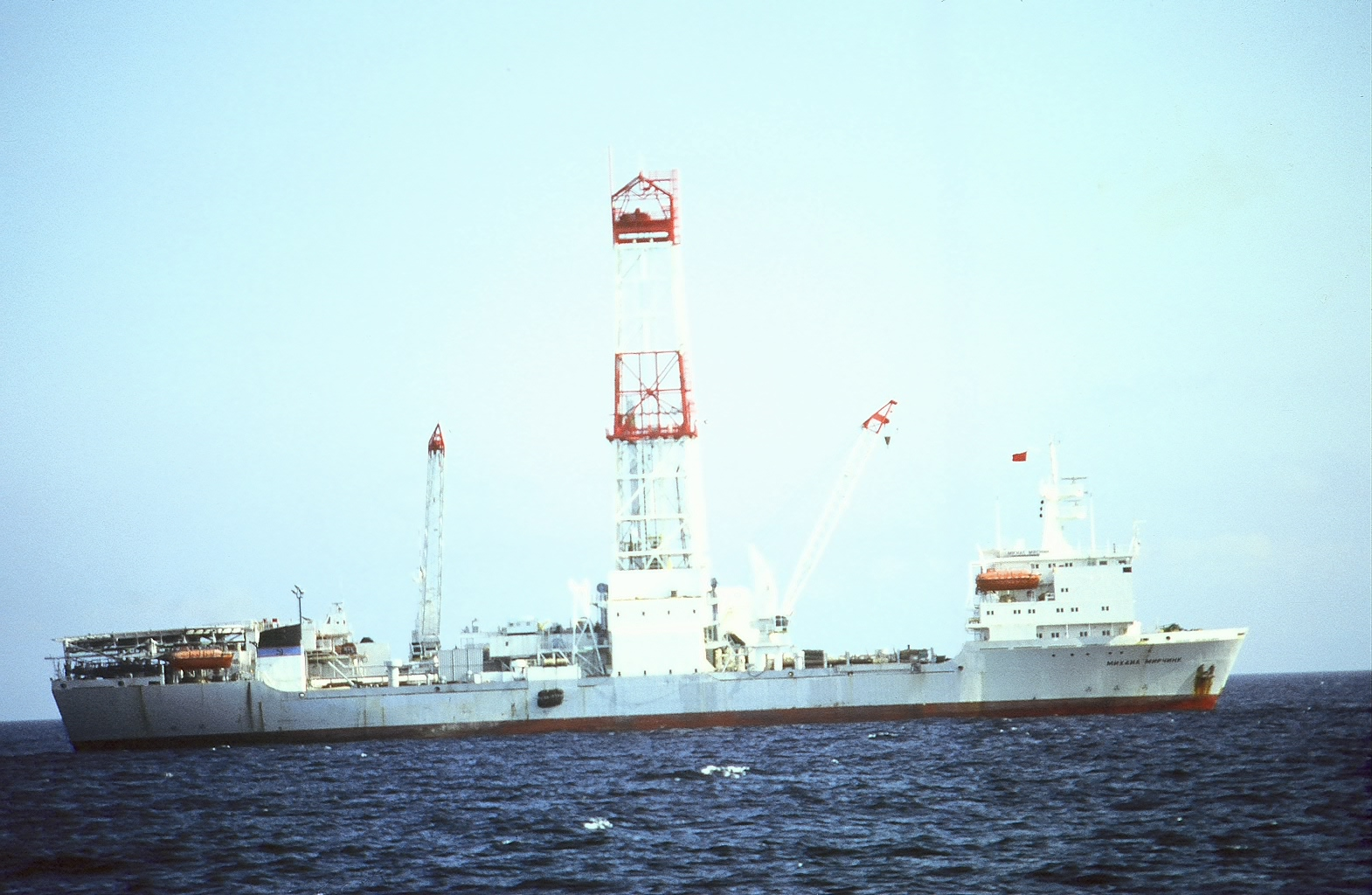
Mikhail Merchink, lead Soviet vessel in simulated search

In 1992, Russian President Boris Yeltsin disclosed five top-secret memos dating from a few weeks after the downing of KAL 007 in 1983. (Note: These memos were published in the Soviet news magazine, Izvestia #228, October 15, 1992, shortly after being made public by Yeltsin.) The memos contained Soviet communications (from KGB Chief Viktor Chebrikov and Defense Minister Dmitriy Ustinov to General Secretary Yuri Andropov) that indicated that they knew the location of KAL 007's wreckage while they were simulating a search and harassing the American Navy; they had found the sought-after cockpit voice recorder on October 20, 1983 (50 days after the incident), and chose to keep this knowledge secret because the tapes did not unequivocally support their firmly held view that KAL 007's flight to Soviet territory was a deliberately planned intelligence mission.

Simulated search efforts in the Sea of Japan are being performed by our vessels at present in order to dis-inform the U.S. and Japan. These activities will be discontinued in accordance with a specific plan...

Therefore, if the flight recorders shall be transferred to western countries their objective data can equally be used by the U.S.S.R. and the western countries in proving the opposite viewpoints on the nature of the flight of the South Korean airplane. In such circumstances, a new phase in anti-Soviet hysteria cannot be excluded.

In connection with all mentioned above, it seems highly preferable not to transfer the flight recorders to the International Civil Aviation Organization (ICAO) or any third party willing to decipher their contents. The fact that the recorders are in possession of the U.S.S.R. shall be kept secret...

As far as we are aware neither the U.S. nor Japan has any information on the flight recorders. We have made necessary efforts in order to prevent any disclosure of the information in the future.

Looking to your approval.

— D. Ustinov, V. Chebrikov (photo) December 1983

The third memo acknowledges that analysis of the recorder tapes showed no evidence of the Soviet interceptor attempting to contact KAL 007 via radio nor any indication that the KAL 007 had been given warning shots.

However in case the flight recorders shall become available to the western countries their data may be used for Confirmation of no attempt by the intercepting aircraft to establish radio contact with the intruder plane on 121.5 MHz and no tracers warning shots in the last section of the flight

That the Soviet search was simulated (while they knew the wreckage lay elsewhere) also is suggested by the article of Mikhail Prozumentshchikov, Deputy Director of the Russian State Archives of Recent History, commemorating the twentieth anniversary of the airplane's shoot-down. Commenting on the Soviet and American searches: "Since the U.S.S.R., for natural reasons, knew better where the Boeing had been downed...it was very problematical to retrieve anything, especially as the U.S.S.R. was not particularly interested".

=== Revised ICAO report (1993) ===
On November 18, 1992, Russian president Boris Yeltsin, in a goodwill gesture to South Korea during a visit to Seoul to ratify a new treaty, released both the flight data recorder (FDR) and cockpit voice recorder (CVR) of KAL 007. Initial South Korean research showed the FDR to be empty and the CVR to have an unintelligible copy. The Russians then released the recordings to the ICAO secretary general. The ICAO report continued to support the initial assertion that KAL 007 accidentally flew in Soviet airspace, after listening to the flight crew's conversations recorded by the CVR, and confirming that either the aircraft had flown on a constant magnetic heading instead of activating the INS and following its assigned waypoints, or, if it had activated the INS, it had been activated when the aircraft had already deviated beyond the 7 1/2-nautical mile Desired Track Envelope within which the waypoints would have been captured.

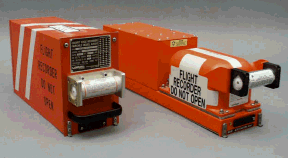
A typical digital flight data recorder and cockpit voice recorder (Note: For illustration only – KAL 007 did not necessarily use this type of recorder.)

In addition, the Russian Federation released "Transcript of Communications. U.S.S.R. Air Defence Command Centres on Sakhalin Island" transcripts to ICAO—this new evidence triggered the revised ICAO report in 1993 "The Report of the Completion of the Fact-Finding Investigation", and is appended to it. These transcripts (of two reels of tape, each containing multiple tracks) are time specified, some to the second, of the communications between the various command posts and other military facilities on Sakhalin from the time of the initial orders for the shoot-down and then through the stalking of KAL 007 by Major Osipovich in his Su-15 interceptor, the attack as seen and commented on by General Kornukov, Commander of Sokol Air Base, down the ranks to the Combat Controller Captain Titovnin.

The transcripts include the post-attack flight of KAL 007 until it had reached Moneron Island, the descent of KAL 007 over Moneron, the initial Soviet SAR missions to Moneron, the futile search of the support interceptors for KAL 007 on the water, and end with the debriefing of Osipovich on return to base. Some of the communications are the telephone conversations between superior officers and subordinates and involve commands to them, while other communications involve the recorded responses to what was then being viewed on radar tracking KAL 007. These multi-track communications from various command posts telecommunicating at the same minute and seconds as other command posts were communicating provide a "composite" picture of what was taking place.

The data from the CVR and the FDR revealed that the recordings broke off after the first minute and 44 seconds of KAL 007's post-missile detonation 12 minute flight. The remaining minutes of the flight would be supplied by Russia's 1992 submission to the ICAO of the real-time Soviet military communication of the shoot-down and aftermath. The fact that both recorder tapes stopped at exactly the same time 1 minute and 44 seconds after missile detonation (18:38:02 UTC) without the tape portions for the more than 10 minutes of KAL 007's post-detonation flight before it descended below radar tracking (18:38 UTC) finds no explanation in the ICAO analysis: "It could not be established why both flight recorders simultaneously ceased to operate 104 seconds after the attack. The power supply cables were fed to the rear of the aircraft in raceways on opposite sides of the fuselage until they came together behind the two recorders."

=== Passenger pain and suffering ===
Passenger pain and suffering was an important factor in determining the level of compensation that was paid by Korean Air Lines.

Fragments from the proximity fused R-98 medium range air-to-air missile exploding 50 metres (160 ft) behind the tail caused punctures to the pressurized passenger cabin. When one of the flight crew radioed Tokyo Area Control one minute and two seconds after missile detonation his breathing was already "accentuated", indicating to ICAO analysts that he was speaking through the microphone located in his oxygen mask, "Korean Air 007 ah... We are... Rapid compressions. Descend to 10,000."

Two expert witnesses testified at a trial before then magistrate judge Naomi Reice Buchwald of the United States District Court for the Southern District of New York. They addressed the issue of pre-death pain and suffering. Captain James McIntyre, an experienced Boeing 747 pilot, and aircraft accident investigator, testified that shrapnel from the missile caused rapid decompression of the cabin, but left the passengers sufficient time to don oxygen masks: "McIntyre testified that, based upon his estimate of the extent of damage the aircraft sustained, all passengers survived the initial impact of the shrapnel from the missile explosion. In McIntyre's expert opinion, at least 12 minutes elapsed between the impact of the shrapnel and the crash of the plane, and the passengers remained conscious throughout."

== Alternate theories ==
Flight 007 has been the subject of controversy and has spawned a number of alternate theories. Many are based on the suppression of evidence such as the flight data recorders, unexplained details such as the role of a USAF RC-135 surveillance aircraft, the untimely destruction of the U.S. Air Force's King Salmon radar data, Cold War disinformation and propaganda and Osipovich's (the Soviet fighter pilot who shot down flight 007) statement that although he knew the plane was a civilian aircraft, he suspected that it could have been used as a spy plane.

American historian and professor Alexander Dallin in his 1985 book concluded that the aircraft could not have intruded into the prohibited Soviet airspace inadvertently, yet found no direct evidence suggesting it had intruded deliberately.

== Aftermath ==
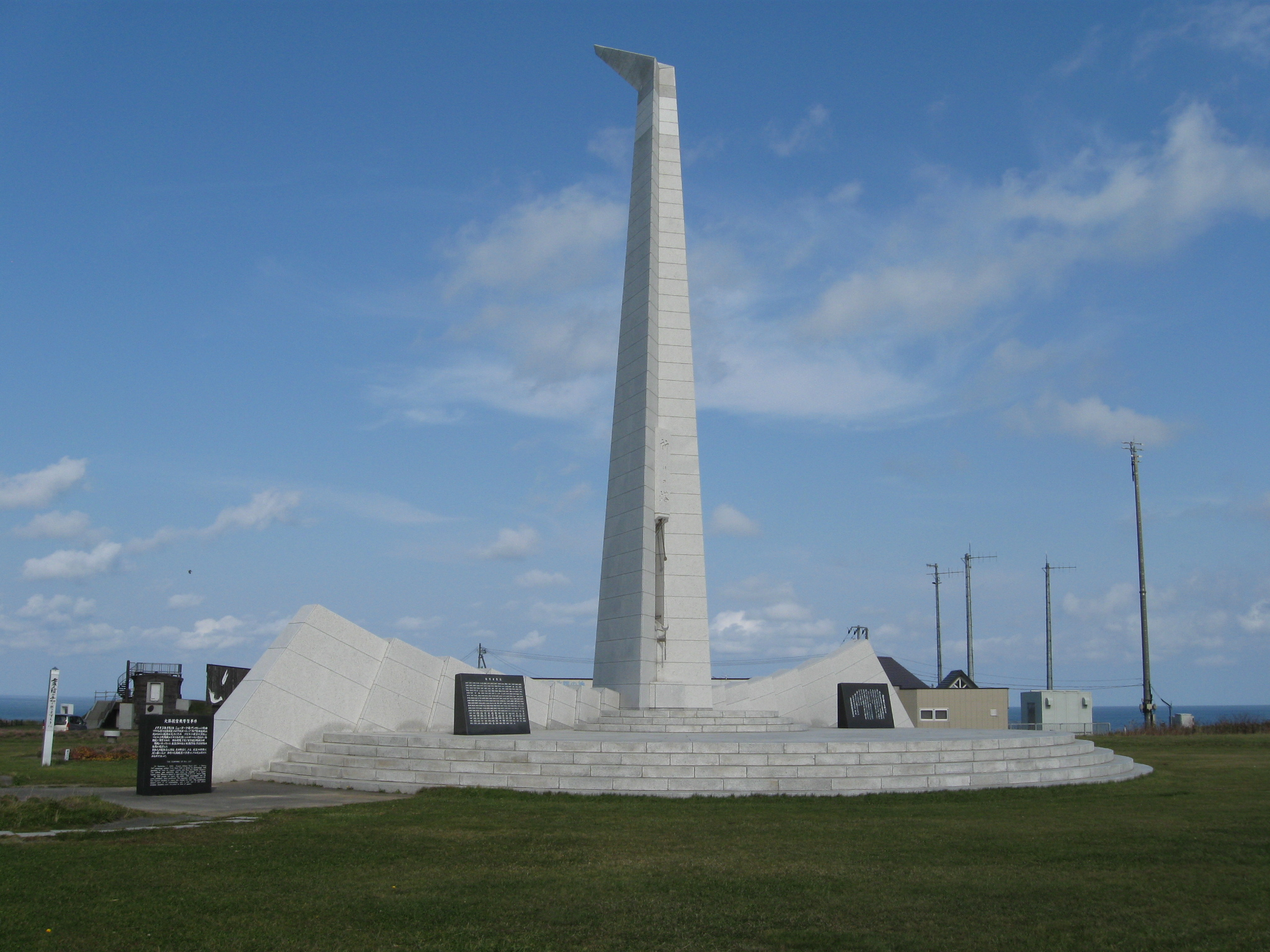
"The Tower of Prayer", a monument to KAL 007 at Cape Sōya, Japan

Two television movies were produced about the incident; both films were produced before the fall of the Soviet Union allowed access to archives. Shootdown (1988), a telemovie starring Angela Lansbury, John Cullum, and Kyle Secor, was based on the book of the same title by R.W. Johnson, about the efforts of Nan Moore (Lansbury), the mother of a passenger, to get answers from the U.S. and Soviet governments. Then the British Granada Television documentary drama Coded Hostile, screened on ITV on September 7, 1989, detailed the U.S. military and governmental investigation, highlighting the likely confusion of Flight 007 with the USAF RC-135 in the context of routine US SIGINT/COMINT missions in the area. Written by Brian Phelan and directed by David Darlow, it starred Michael Murphy, Michael Moriarty, and Chris Sarandon. An updated version was screened by Channel 4 in the UK on August 31, 1993, incorporating details of the 1992 UN investigation.

On September 26, 1983, a nuclear false alarm incident occurred, which almost led to nuclear war. In the aftermath of the airliner shootdown, the Soviet military system was geared to detect a first strike and immediately retaliate, and an optical illusion led the early warning system to malfunction and trigger a false alarm.

The FAA temporarily closed Airway R-20, the air corridor that Korean Air Flight 007 was meant to follow, on September 2. Airlines fiercely resisted the closure of this popular route, the shortest of five corridors between the United States and Eastern Asia. It was therefore reopened on October 2 after safety and navigational aids were checked.

NATO had decided, under the impetus of the Reagan administration, to deploy Pershing II and Gryphon cruise missiles in West Germany. Support for the deployment was wavering and it looked doubtful that it would be carried out. When the Soviet Union shot down Flight 007, the U.S. was able to galvanize enough support at home and abroad to enable the deployment to go ahead.

The unprecedented disclosure of the communications intercepted by the United States and Japan revealed a considerable amount of information about their intelligence systems and capabilities. National Security Agency director Lincoln D. Faurer commented: "...as a result of the Korean Air Lines affair, you have already heard more about my business in the past two weeks than I would desire... For the most part, this has not been a matter of unwelcome leaks. It is the result of a conscious, responsible decision to address an otherwise unbelievable horror." Changes that the Soviets subsequently made to their codes and frequencies reduced the effectiveness of this monitoring by 60%.

The U.S. KAL 007 Victims' Association, under the leadership of Hans Ephraimson-Abt, successfully lobbied U.S. Congress and the airline industry to accept an agreement that would ensure future victims of airline incidents would be compensated quickly and fairly by increasing compensation and lowering the burden of proof for airliner misconduct. This legislation has had far-reaching effects for the victims of subsequent aircraft disasters.

The U.S. decided to utilize military radars to extend air traffic control radar coverage from 200 to 1,200 miles (320 to 1,930 km) out from Anchorage. (Note: These radars had been used in 1968 to alert Seaboard World Airlines Flight 253A in a similar situation.) The FAA also established a secondary radar system (ATCBI-5) on Saint Paul Island. In 1986, the United States, Japan and the Soviet Union set up a joint air traffic control system to monitor aircraft over the North Pacific, thereby giving the Soviet Union formal responsibility to monitor civilian air traffic, and setting up direct communication links between the controllers of the three countries.

On September 16, 1983 a White House press secretary read a statement on the downing of Korean Air Lines Flight 007. It is announced that the GPS system should be available for civil aviation with the planned completion in 1988. This communication was sometimes understood as the release of the military project for the general public. However, the GPS system was developed from the start for military and civilian navigation.

The regular air route between Seoul and Moscow started in April 1990 as the result of the Nordpolitik policy of South Korea, operated by Aeroflot and Korean Air; meanwhile, all 9 of Korean Air's European routes would start passing through Soviet airspace. This was the first time Korean Air aircraft was officially permitted to pass through Soviet airspace.

Alvin Snyder, the director of worldwide television for the United States Information Agency, was the producer of the video shown to the U.N. Security Council on September 6, 1983. In an article in The Washington Post on September 1, 1996, he stated that he had been given only limited access to the transcripts of the Soviet communication when he produced the video in 1983. When he received full insight into the Soviet transmissions in 1993, he says he realized that: "The Russians (sic) believed the plane to be an RC-135 reconnaissance plane" and that "Osipovich (the Soviet fighter pilot) could not identify the plane" and "That he fired warning cannon shots and tipped his wings, an international signal to force the plane to land". Some of these statements were contradicted by the pilot in an interview with The New York Times, in which he confirmed that he did fire warning shots, but that they would not have been visible as they were not tracers.

In a March 15, 2001, interview, Valery Kamensky, then Commander of the Soviet Far East Military District Air Defense Force and direct superior to General Kornukov, opined that such a shoot-down of a civilian passenger plane could not happen again in view of the changing political conditions and alliances. In this interview, Kamensky stated, "It is still a mystery what happened to the bodies of the crew and passengers on the plane. According to one theory, right after the detonation of the rocket, the nose and tail section of the jumbo fell off and the mid-fuselage became a sort of wind tunnel so the people were swept through it and scattered over the surface of the ocean. Yet in this case, some of the bodies were to have been found during the search operations in the area. The question of what actually happened to the people has not been given a distinct answer."

Two memorials honor the victims of KAL 007. In Cape Sōya, Hokkaido, the Tower of Prayer, a 19.83 meter tall structure with 269 white stones, each representing the victims. In Seoul, South Korea, the KAL Memorial Tower, a granite monument at the National Mang-Hyang Cemetery, honors the victims.

On September 1, 2003, commenting on the 20th anniversary of the shoot-down article in RIA Novosti, Mikhail Prozumentshchikov, Deputy Director of the Russian State Archives of Recent History, disclosed that the Soviet naval forces in the search for KAL 007 in international waters, already "knew better where [it] had been downed" while conducting their search and that nothing was found "especially as the USSR was not particularly interested."

Korean Air still flies from John F. Kennedy International Airport in New York City to Seoul. However, the flight no longer stops at Anchorage or flies to Gimpo International Airport as it now flies directly to Incheon International Airport. Flight number 007 has been retired since, using flight numbers for 3 separate flights as 82, 86 and 250. As of October 2025, the separate flights are being served using a Boeing 777F for Flight 250 as a cargo flight, a Boeing 777-300ER for Flight 86, and an Airbus A380 for Flight 82.

Russia shot down Korean Air Lines Flight 007 on September 1, 1983. At that time, GPS was not yet available for civilian use; it was primarily a military technology. The incident highlighted the need for improved navigation systems, which eventually contributed to the development and deployment of GPS for civilian applications in the following years. GPS Accessibility: Civilian access to the Global Positioning System (GPS) was accelerated, significantly improving navigation for both aviation and maritime operations worldwide.

== In popular culture ==
=== Books ===
First published in 2009, The Zero Option by David Rollins was released, referencing heavily the KAL 007 incident, with the accident being a major plot device during the novel.

=== Films ===
In 1989, HBO released the film Tailspin: Behind the Korean Airliner Tragedy, with Michael Moriarty, Michael Murphy, Chris Sarandon, and Harris Yulin, about the case of Korean Air Lines flight 007.

The disaster was referenced several times in the 1991 thriller film A Kiss Before Dying.

The shootdown was depicted in the 2024 biographical film Reagan.

=== Television ===
The story of the disaster was featured on the ninth season of Cineflix television show Mayday in the episode entitled "Target Is Destroyed" (S09E05) (2010).

The aviation disaster is covered via televised news and discussed by multiple characters, specifically two Stasi agents in one scene and two Stasi agents and a Russian Soviet government official in another, in season 1, episode 6 (Brandy Station) of Deutschland 83 (2015). In both scenes, the downing is implicitly blamed on the United States; as a result of their violations of Soviet airspace, the civilian passenger plane was believed to have been a spy plane and thus shot down. Ultimately, it is one of many factors which led to heightened tensions between the West and the Soviet Union in 1983, which reached their peak during Able Archer. This storyline is the basis of the show's first season.

The American science fiction television drama series For All Mankind depicted the incident in the second season episode "Don't Be Cruel" . In the episode, NASA Administrator Thomas O. Paine was a passenger on the flight and his death escalated the diplomatic crisis underlining the show's depiction of how an alternate Space Race could have gone. In the episode, characters suggested various explanations for the downing, including the spy plane theory (as the plane was flying over the fictional launch site of Buran in the series), or alternatively positioning him as the sole target that led to the downing of the flight.

=== Music ===
In 1984, a song about Flight 007 was featured on the Gary Moore album Victims of the Future under the title "Murder in the Skies".

Lee Greenwood wrote the song "God Bless the USA" (1984) in response to his feelings about the shooting down of Korean Air Lines Flight 007. Greenwood stated in the book God Bless the USA (written by himself and Gwen McLin) that the song's lyrics flowed naturally from the music as an honest reflection of his pride to be American.

In 1984, the Italian punk band CCCP - Fedeli alla linea released their first EP, Ortodossia, containing the track "Spara Jurij," related to the KAL007 tragedy. The title (meaning "Yuri, shoot") and lyrics refers to Yuri Andropov, at the time leader of the Soviet Union.

=== Other ===
In November 1983, KGO-TV in San Francisco, California, aired an advertisement for an upcoming news special report titled "Green Street Reds", about suspicious activities at the Soviet Consulate General of San Francisco. In the ad, they depicted Santa Claus and his reindeer being shot down by a Soviet missile. The advertisement was produced by Richard Williams Animation. Angry parents complained to KGO about the poor impression the image of Santa's death made upon young children.

== See also ==
- Cold War (1979–85)
- History of the Soviet Union (1982–91)
- Korean Air Lines Flight 902
- List of airliner shootdown incidents
- List of members of the United States Congress killed or wounded in office
- Notable decompression accidents and incidents
- Siberia Airlines Flight 1812
- Iran Air Flight 655
- Malaysia Airlines Flight 17
- Ukraine International Airlines Flight 752
- Azerbaijan Airlines Flight 8243
- Kaleva (airplane)
- 1983 Soviet nuclear false alarm incident, which happened three weeks later.
