= Moneron Island =

Island in Sakhalin Oblast, Russian Federation

Coordinates: 46°15′N 141°14′E

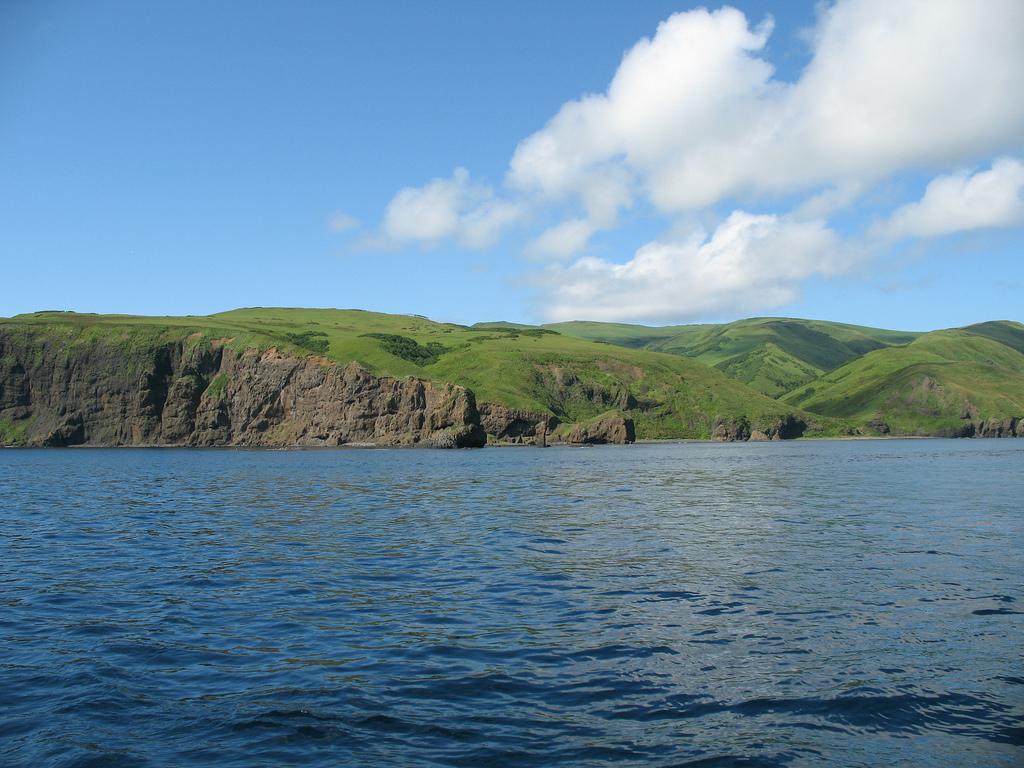
Moneron Island

Moneron Island, (Russian: Монерон, Japanese: 海馬島, romanized: Kaibatō, トド島, Todojima, Ainu: Todomoshiri) is a small island off Sakhalin Island. It is a part of the Russian Federation. It also is near the crash site of Korean Air Flight 007, and the Boeing 747 crashed into the Strait of Tartary.

== Description ==
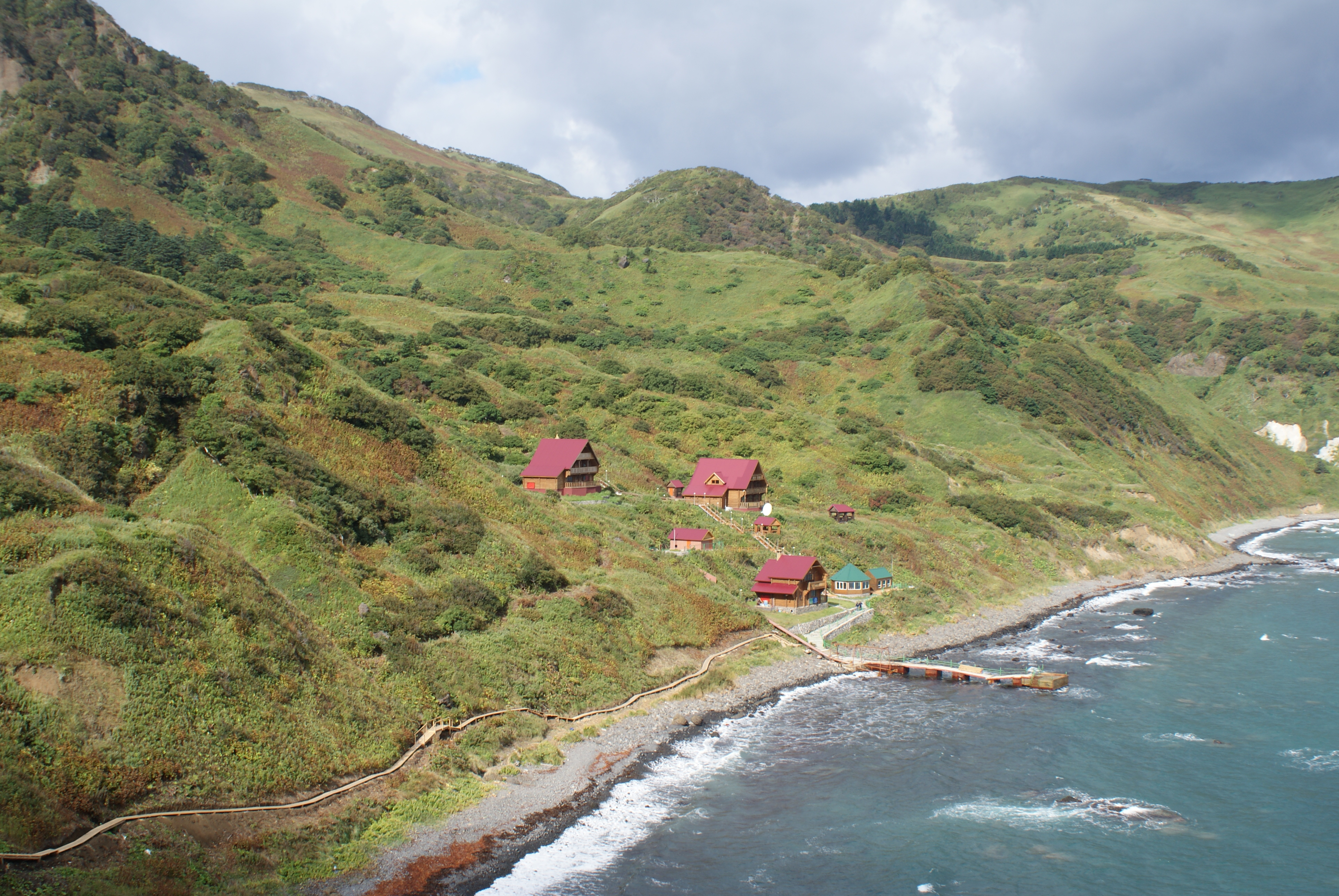
Tourist facilities on Moneron Island

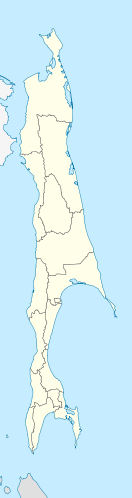
Location of Moneron

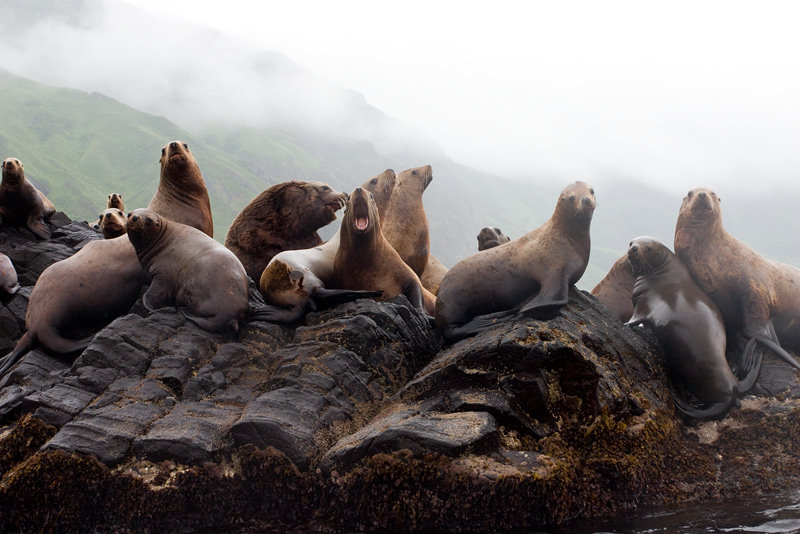
Sea lions on Moneron Island

Moneron has an area of about 30 square kilometres (12 mi^{2}) and a highest point of 429 metres (1,407 ft). It is approximately 7.2 km (4.5 mi) long (N/S axis) by 5.5 km (3.4 mi) wide, and is located 41 nautical miles (76 km) from Sakhalin's port of Nevelsk and about 30 nautical miles (56 km) directly southwest of Sakhalin Island itself at the northeastern end of the Sea of Japan. It is the only landmass in the whole Tatar Straits and has no permanent population. On a clear day, the Japanese Rishiri Island is visible.

== History ==
The island was known as Todomoshiri ("island of sea lions") by its original Ainu inhabitants. It came under the daimyō of Matsumae clan in the 18th century and was known as Ishiyokotan; it got its current European name from a visit of the French navigator La Perouse, who named it Moneron after Paul Mérault Monneron, the chief engineer of his expedition.

Paul Monneron was tasked with mapping the island named after him. The first authentic map of Moneron Island was made later, in 1867, by Russian hydrographers who put it on the map of the Russian Empire. The expedition was led by one K. Staritsky, after whom the highest spot was named.

Following the close of the Russo-Japanese war 1904-5, Moneron island was transferred to Japan ipso facto along with the part of Sakhalin island south of the 50th parallel according to the Treaty of Portsmouth.

By 1907, the Japanese named it Kaibato (海馬島) and henceforth the island was a part of the Karafuto Agency until the end of World War II. Kaiba is a translation of the Ainu name using Sino-Japanese pronunciation. It is also known as "Todojima" (トド島) -- a direct rendering of the Ainu name, on which is appended the Japanese word for island (島) in its native pronunciation (shima / jima).

The Japanese period in the history of Moneron was notable for both the rather predatory exploitation of its rapidly depleted natural resources and significant investments in the development of the island's infrastructure. Active settlement of the island began in the 1910s. The oldest surviving building on the island dating from 1910 also belongs to this period. A meteorological station was built here, which is still in operation today. From Sakhalin, an underwater telephone cable with a length of more than 50 km was laid here. In 1914, the Japanese authorities erected a lighthouse which is still in use today. The economy of the island was based on logging and fishing with the Pacific herring (Clupea pallasii) being especially important. In the mid-1920s, a wooden shelter was built in the southern part of Chuprov Bay, which became a refuge for a small coastal fleet. In the 1930s, it was replaced with a concrete one. To meet the religious needs of the colonists, the Japanese set up a small Shinto shrine in the pit of Krasnaya, surrounded by old fir trees.

In 1936, the resident population of the Japanese Moneron reached 900 people. Together with seasonal workers employed in the maritime sector on the island, in the early 1920s there were up to 2000 people inhabiting the island. During this period, rice cultivation developed on the northern cape near the bay of Kologeras; there are still preserved the remains of an irrigation system that once fed Japanese rice fields. However, the rather predatory beginning of Japanese colonisation undermined the sustainable development of the island's economy. By the mid-1920s, fish catches in its waters had declined so much that most of the newly arrived Japanese colonists left the island, and by 1945 there were no more than 200 inhabitants left on it.

During the Second World War, the island, apparently, was of great strategic importance for both Japan and the USSR. Particularly noteworthy is the fact that in Soviet archival documents relating to the military operations of the USSR in the Far East in 1945, there is no mention of the capture of Moneron, despite the fact that there are unmarked graves of Soviet soldiers on the island.

After World War II, Moneron became part of the Sakhalin Oblast of the USSR. The modern version of the European name “Moneron” was restored after 1946. The main industrial core of the island's economy was a fish factory in the southern part of Chuprov Bay which gave work to local fishing villages. According to the 1959 census, a little over 500 people permanently lived in three settlements on the island: Moneron, Krasny and Bodry. At the peak of economic development during the spring and summer up to 2,000 seasonal workers arrived. Already in the second half of the 1950s, the fishing industry of the Sakhalin region reoriented itself towards more profitable ocean expedition fishing. This led to the decision to liquidate the fish factory on Moneron and the outflow of its population. Until the mid-1960s, on the island, which is known for its lush vegetation, mobile brigades of mowers from Nevelsk continued to harvest coarse and succulent fodder. Until the early 1970s, oil exploration was carried out on the island, which also disfigured the island. During the 1970s, the island lost its permanent population and received the status of a closed border zone with a minor and then occasional military presence. The outflow of the population in general favourably affected the flora and fauna of the island.

=== KAL 007 ===
Korean Air Flight 007, with 269 passengers and crew, spiraled around Moneron Island twice before crashing into the Sea of Japan off the island's coastline during the final phase of its controlled 12-minute descent after being struck by a single air-to-air missile launched at it on 1 September 1983 from a Sukhoi Su-15, for straying into restricted Soviet airspace. Its precise position and final distance from the island are disputed.

== Fauna and flora ==
The island is a popular place for diving and for birds. Surrounded by steep cliffs and rocky islets, it is a haven for sea birds. The warm Tsushima Current brings abundant marine life to the surrounding waters and species normally found much further south abound.

In 2006, infrastructure was constructed to allow tourists to visit the island. The facilities are operated by the Moneron National Park, which is the first marine national park in Russia.
