= Spycraft =

Spycraft may refer to:

- Spycraft (role-playing game), 2002 role-playing game
- Spycraft: The Great Game, 1996 adventure game
- Spycraft (book), 2024 book written by Nadine Akkerman and Pete Langman
- Spycraft (TV series), American docuseries

== See also ==
- Espionage
- Tradecraft
