= Autumn Forge 83 =

Military exercise

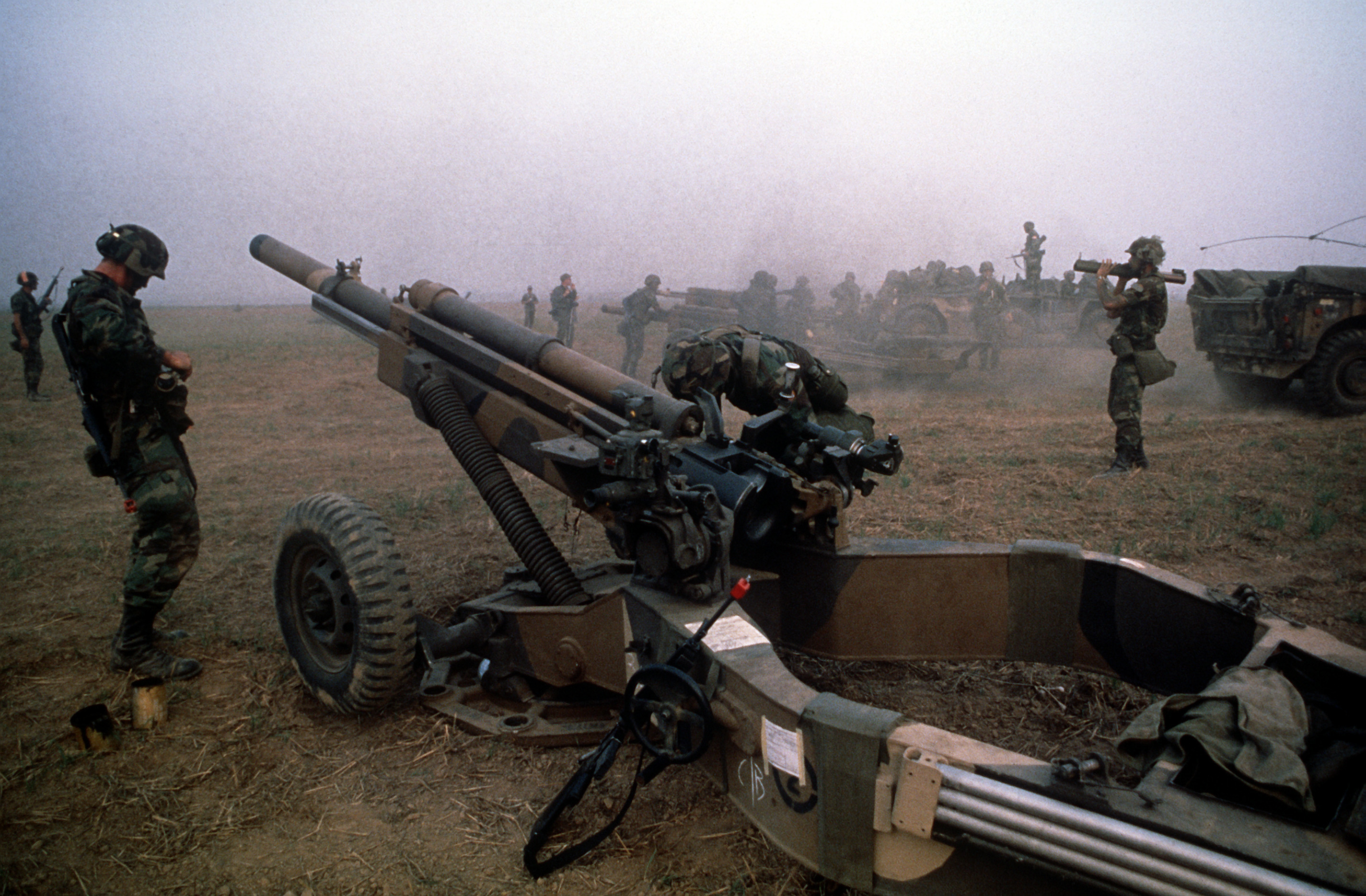
Members of the 82nd Airborne Division during Autumn Forge 83

Autumn Forge 83 was a military exercise that included a one hundred and seventy-three flight airlift of 19,000 soldiers to Europe under radio silence. Additionally, 1,500 tons of cargo was also transported during the exercise.

== Makeup ==
Autumn Forge 83 was made up of at least six exercises, including:

- Able Archer 83, part of Exercise Able Archer
- Cold Fire 83, part of Exercise Cold Fire
- Crested Cap 83, part of Exercise Created Cap
- Display Determination 83, part of Exercise Display Determination
- Oksoboel 83, part of Exercise Oksoboel
- Exercise Reforger 83, part of Exercise Reforger

Atlantic Lion 83, the 1 (NL) Corps Field Training Exercise made up of 24,000 soldiers, 850 armored vehicles, and 6,000 other vehicles from the Royal Netherlands Army participated also occurred during this time period, although it was not directly a part of Autumn Forge. The United States Army contributed 11,000 troops (drawn from its Reforger contingent), 1,000 armored and 1,100 other vehicles. The British Army added 600 troops, 100 armored and 70 other vehicles. Reforger was the largest American exercise in Autumn Forge 83, but the Dutch Atlantic Lion was larger than Reforger by an estimated 7,000 troops.
