= Warsaw Pact Early Warning Indicator Project =

US and Allied project warning of attacks

The Warsaw Pact Early Warning Indicator Project was a highly classified US and Allied program designed to gather intelligence that would provide indicators of impending Soviet nuclear attacks before they occurred. It was the American analogue to Operation RYAN. The project aimed to observe and find ways to prevent conflicts with the Soviet Union and its allies from the Warsaw Pact. It consisted of intense clandestine reporting, and Indicator and Warning Methodology.

== Background ==
=== Prelude to Cold War ===
Trevor Barnes reports that what the US perceived of the Soviet Union in 1946 is important to note, as there was "almost total lack of information about Russia." Events, such as the Pearl Harbor bombing, and the rise of Cold War tensions lead to the development of the CIA in 1947. In the same year, the CIA, was made aware of a possible Russian mobilisation of Eastern Europe. This was discovered by British intelligence services who provided the information to the US government. The information that was gathered by US and British intelligence agencies did not have serious repercussions on the Soviet Union. According to a CIA analysis, the US government resorted to "clandestine sources" to retrieve political and militant information following World War II.

=== The Warsaw Pact ===
The Warsaw Pact was a treaty, that was officially formed on May 14, 1955. The Countries who signed the treaty were the Soviet Union, Albania, Bulgaria, Czechoslovakia, East Germany, Hungary, Poland and Romania. In 1968, Albania withdrew from the treaty, followed by East Germany in 1990. The purpose of this Treaty was for the authorisation of these nations to have command of Soviet owned regions. It was divided into two sections; the Consultative Committee and the Unified Command of Pact Armed Forces. The Consultative Committee responsibilities involved conducting the movements and actions of other treaty members. CIA reports in 1966 perceived the treaty as one of the last remaining ways in which the Soviet bloc was being maintained by the USSR.

=== Events During the Cold War ===
During the 1950s the Soviet Union, and its allies, began limiting NATO and the US's access to their military information. Nikita Khrushchev assumed power following the death of Joseph Stalin in 1953. Relations between the USSR and Eastern Europe became intense. Examples include the riots in Poland (1956), Hungary's attempt to leave the Warsaw Pact and the Berlin Crisis (1958–61). The Berlin Crisis exposed the United States' lack of military preparedness and had the potential to escalate any aggression between NATO and the Warsaw Pact. On the July 15, 1961, it was announced by President Kennedy that a program was being developed to improve in both skill and size the US army, and the additional forces that were to be sent to Berlin. A sudden change to the Kremlin leadership in 1983, saw many attempts made by the Soviet Union to show displays of power. The Soviet Union/ Warsaw Pact increased naval activities, equipment and field training. According to historian Nate Jones, factories that provided materials for these operations were in a state of constant production. Ground and naval invasions by the Soviet Union were undertaken in Greece and the Mediterranean as well as attacks against NATO bases established in Europe and the UK.

== Indicator and Warning Methodology ==
Since the inception of the CIA, the primal focus of the group was strategic warning. The aim of this methodology was to, receive early warning about any possible Soviet invasion of Europe or Nuclear strike. Indication methodology began as early as World War II. In 1948, US and British intelligence began formulating large lists of any threatening signs displayed by enemy powers. In the 1950s Indicator lists were a major part of the Indicator and observation methods. Cynthia Grabo defines Indicator lists as "a compilation of projected, anticipated or hypothetical actions" (cited in Gentry & Gordon, 2019). CIA operatives would use these lists and deduce the likelihood of a major conflict occurring from them. This process was based on close analysis of Warsaw Pact movement and hypothesising the consequences of their actions.

In the 1960s, US analysts came to the conclusion that Soviet and Warsaw Pact scenarios include:

a. Premeditated surprise attack

b. Preemptive attack

c. Escalation (limited war to general war)

d. Limited war

e. Guerrilla warfare

f. Diplomatic crisis with no military intent

g. Military suppression of internal dissent.

A warning of a possible military conflict would have to include:

- Enemy preparations that if continued would indicate the ability to go to engage in a conflict for a certain period of time
- Make connections between these preparations and a related crises
- Details concerning strategies and plans
- Provide information to those with authority

Analysts would deliberate and report on significant activity changes, their importance and the implications and provide warning messages that would indicate an upcoming crisis. According to Gentry and Gordon, the US has used the colour green, yellow and red to convey crisis as part of their waning messages. This method extended into the 1980s when Able Archer (created by NATO) and Project RYAN (created by the Soviet Union/ Warsaw Pact) were being developed to attack opposing nations. Alongside US surveillance mechanisms, the Soviet/ Warsaw Pact participated in a process of similar tactics out of fear of a possible nuclear attack from the west. Gentry and Gordon conclude that the Indicator and Warning method proved a good long term technique that was able to combat "large-scale military- threat situations." Its scientific analysis of variables allowed governments to determine appropriate reactions to enemy activity. Because it is a largely reactive methodology, results remain uncertain until they are carried out in the real world.

== Observation in Action ==
=== The NIC: developing Indicator and Warning Methodology and the Warsaw Pact ===
In 1954 the National Indications Centre (NIC) was developed to oversee US warning and indication methodology and progress. The group consisted of many US government based organisations including the CIA and FBI. The NIC observed and analysed a number of crises including the Warsaw Pact and their involvement in the Hungarian Revolution in 1956. Grabo also notes the centre's observation and warning methodology during the Cuban Missile Crisis. The centre used its 30 person team to monitor any emerging crises, relying on the Indicator lists to influence their judgement. Often, the NIC were looking for signs of surprise military attacks, as well as finding ways to identify the minute details of these attacks. They implemented a routine, where warning reports were published weekly and their Indication and Waning tactics gradually became a recognised methodology. They were given the authority to make quick decisions when facing a crisis, and they were also able to pass on messages to the White House.

After some mistakes made by the NIC regarding the Vietnam conflict, there were also some failures regarding the Warsaw Pact and their military invasion of Czechoslovakia in 1968. The NIC failed to warn of the impending invasion. Some errors they made include the NIC's understanding that the Soviet Union would not attempt to interfere with other nations, due to the Hungarian revolt in 1956. They also did not realise the value of US intervention to prevent Soviet military involvement in Czechoslovakia. By the year 1970, it was widely understood that the NIC was no longer effective.

=== Observation of the Warsaw Pact, 1950s–60s ===
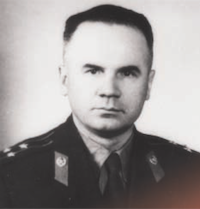
Oleg Penkovskiy was a Soviet Colonel. He provided intelligence to the CIA during the Cold War Period. This information involved the Warsaw Pact, their military capabilities and tactics

When Indicator and Warning Methodology was yet to be developed, the US-based their perceptions of the USSR and the motivations behind their behaviour on WWII facts. Between the years of 1955-59, the US had two strategies of gaining Soviet intelligence. The Berlin Tunnel operation and Major Pyotr Popov were two ways in which the CIA were able to report on Warsaw Pact movement and their military relationship with the Soviet Union. The Berlin Tunnel instructed US clandestine reporters on the maintaining of Soviet forces in East Germany between 1955-1956. Popov made clandestine reports on the Soviet Union and their military tactics, which have been reported to have made a direct influence on the US and their counteractive strategies. Popov's reporting included providing the US with documentation that involved nuclear warfare, missiles and air operations.

Confrontations between the US and the USSR over access to West Berlin, were both military based and political. This would later have a direct impact on the construction of the Berlin Wall in 1961. Actions to diminish crises from the Kennedy government were perceived as ill-equipped and not as strong, when comparing to the Soviet Union and the Warsaw Pact. Colonel Oleg Penkovskiy delivered clandestine reports to the CIA and British MI-6. He specifically reported on Khrushchev's perceptions of the Kennedy government and their military capabilities in the event of a confrontation about West Berlin. Krushchev used a Warsaw Pact military exercise to exert Soviet strength if a confrontation over West berlin would occur. Penkovskiy reported that discontent began to grow as other Soviet members did not approve of Krushchev instigation for a possible war. According to these reports, the Red Army was not yet equipped for a military confrontation with US and NATO forces.

=== Observation of the Warsaw Pact, 1970–85 ===
The years of 1973-85, saw a peak in Warsaw Pact observation reports, which can be attributed to technological advancements that improved "clandestine" reporting and observation mechanisms. As reports of the Warsaw Pact increased, the US government was able to make appropriate decisions in regards to defence policies. Decisions were made based on the Warsaw Pact's ability to mobilise its military, their resources and the nations' wartime objectives. In the 1970s, the Soviet Union/ Warsaw Pact found that they were heavily impacted by NATO air power, specifically US and Israeli air forces. Observation allowed the US government to become aware of a Soviet plan to use strategic bombing to combat their forces; noting their distinct reluctance to use Nuclear warfare. In 1983, the rehearsal of a hypothetical, Soviet/Warsaw Pact attack on Western Europe occurred; this was known as the Able Archer exercise. The response to this exercise was increasing of intelligence measures in East Germany and Poland. According to historian Nate Jones, Able Archer was considered a "threat of possible aggression against the USSR and Warsaw Pact countries."

An indicator and Warnings report in 1978 analysed the Warsaw Pact indicators, that revealed their capabilities to go to war against NATO. The document assessed the likelihood of a conflict, the Soviet perceptions of a war, Soviet capabilities, and the warnings that motivated the creation of this report. The document suggested that if NATO was unable to defeat Warsaw Pact forces or if Soviet did not see reliance in these forces, the conflict could become nuclear. In terms of the likelihood of a conflict occurring at this time, it was concluded in this report that it was unlikely that the Soviets would deliberately attack NATO forces.

In 1983, negotiations ensued between NATO and the Warsaw Pact members in regards to the amount of ground forces based in Central Europe. In a twelve-page, 1984 government document, the US come to the conclusion that from their observations and estimations that they would not take any aggressive militant action. Specifically, the document argues that the Soviet Union would engage in a decade long "political struggle". According to the National Security Archive, the Warsaw Pact Early Warning Indicator Project was reported on February 1, 1985.

== Declassification of Cold War Documents ==
Discussions for CIA declassification of documents began in 1991, with the release of 112 Soviet related documents the following year. Sources regarding warning and indication, specific to the Warsaw Pact Early Warning Indicator Project have not been entirely made available to the public. For example, Memorandum from the National Intelligence Officer for Warning to the Director of Soviet Analysis (1985) has only two out of fifty-eight pages that provide information. The document does not disclose when the project began and concluded, who oversaw its findings, what indicators were brought to the CIA's attention and what tactics they used to combat or resolve the crisis. The 1978, Implications for NATO Warning of War... document, has major parts of text that have been blacked out. There is a lack of information in regarding NATO suspicions of the Warsaw Pact during this period of time.

== See also ==
- Able Archer 83
