= Operation RYAN =

1980s Soviet military intelligence program

- Russian: Операция РЯН
- Romanization: Operation RYAN

Operation RYAN (or RYaN, and sometimes written as VRYAN, Russian: РЯН, IPA: [rʲæn]) was a Cold War military intelligence program run by the Soviet Union in the early 1980s, when they believed the United States was planning for an imminent first strike attack. The name is an acronym for Raketno-Yadernoe Napadenie (Russian: Ракетно-ядерное нападение, "Nuclear Missile Attack"). The purpose of the operation was to collect intelligence on potential contingency plans of the Reagan administration to launch a nuclear first strike against the Soviet Union. The program was initiated in May 1981 by Yuri Andropov, then chairman of the KGB.

== Background ==
Leonid Brezhnev and Yuri Andropov, then Chairman of the KGB, justified the creation of Operation RYaN because, they claimed, the United States was "actively preparing for nuclear war" against the Soviet Union and its allies. According to a Stasi report released in the mid-2010s, the primary "Chekist work" discussed in the May 1981 meeting was the "demand to allow for 'no surprise.'"

== Operation ==
The Soviet defector Oleg Gordievsky divulged a top-secret KGB telegram sent to the London KGB residency in February 1983. It stated: "The objective of the assignment is to see that the Residency works systematically to uncover any plans in preparation by the main adversary [USA] for RYAN and to organize a continual watch to be kept for indications of a decision being taken to use nuclear weapons against the USSR or immediate preparations being made for a nuclear missile attack."

An attachment listed seven "immediate" and thirteen "prospective" tasks for the agents to complete and report. These included: the collection of data on potential places of evacuation and shelter, an appraisal of the level of blood held in blood banks, observation of places where nuclear decisions were made and where nuclear weapons were stored, observation of key nuclear decision makers, observation of lines of communication, reconnaissance of the heads of churches and banks, and surveillance of security services and military installations.

RYAN took on a new significance after the announcement of plans to deploy Pershing II W85-nuclear-armed missiles to West Germany. These missiles were designed to be launched from road-mobile vehicles, making the launch sites very hard to find. The flight time from West Germany to European Russia was only four to six minutes, with an approximate flying time from six to eight minutes from West Germany to Moscow, giving the Soviets little or no warning.

On 23 March 1983, Ronald Reagan publicly announced the development of the Strategic Defense Initiative. The Soviet government felt that the purpose of SDI technology was to render the US invulnerable to Soviet attack, thereby allowing the US to launch missiles against the USSR without fear of retaliation. This concern about a surprise attack prompted the sudden expansion of the RYAN program. The level of concern reached its peak after the Soviets shot down KAL 007 near Moneron Island on 1 September 1983, and during the North Atlantic Treaty Organization exercise Able Archer 83 in November. The Soviet Union believed that a United States first strike on the Soviet Union was imminent.

Although Andropov died in February 1984, RYAN continued to be maintained and developed under the direction of Victor Chebrikov. Consultations held in August 1984 between the Stasi's head of the Main Directorate of Reconnaissance, Markus Wolf, and KGB experts discussed the early detection of potential war preparations in adversaries, and indicated that the First Chief Directorate of the KGB was proposing to create a new division, to deal exclusively with RYAN. 300 positions within the KGB were earmarked for RYAN, of which 50 were reserved for the new division.

Operation RYAN continued to be maintained until at least April 1989.

== Works ==
- Deutschland 83

== See also ==
US intelligence report on RYAN

- Able Archer 83
- Warsaw Pact Early Warning Indicator Project
