= Cold War (1979–1985) =

Phase of the Cold War during 1979–1985

The Cold War from 1979 to 1985 was a late phase of the Cold War marked by a sharp increase in hostility between the Soviet Union and the West. It arose from a strong denunciation of the Soviet invasion of Afghanistan in December 1979. With the election of British prime minister Margaret Thatcher in 1979, and American president Ronald Reagan in 1980, a corresponding change in Western foreign policy approach toward the Soviet Union was marked by the rejection of détente in favor of the Reagan Doctrine policy of rollback, with the stated goal of dissolving Soviet influence in Soviet Bloc countries. During this time, the threat of nuclear war had reached new heights not seen since the Cuban Missile Crisis of 1962.

The Soviet Union invaded Afghanistan following the Saur Revolution in that country, ultimately leading to the deaths of around one million civilians. Mujahideen fighters succeeded in forcing a Soviet military withdrawal in 1989. In response, U.S. president Jimmy Carter announced a U.S.-led boycott of the 1980 Summer Olympics in Moscow. In 1984, the Soviet Union responded with its own boycott of the 1984 Summer Olympics in Los Angeles, California. Tensions increased when the U.S. announced they would deploy Pershing II missiles in West Germany, followed by Reagan's announcement of the U.S. Strategic Defense Initiative and were further exacerbated in 1983 when Reagan branded the Soviet Union an "evil empire".

In April 1983, the United States Navy conducted FleetEx '83-1, the largest fleet exercise held to date in the North Pacific. The conglomeration of approximately forty ships with 23,000 crewmembers and 300 aircraft, was arguably the most powerful naval armada ever assembled. U.S. aircraft and ships attempted to provoke the Soviets into reacting, allowing U.S. Naval Intelligence to study Soviet radar characteristics, aircraft capabilities, and tactical maneuvers. On April 4, at least six U.S. Navy aircraft flew over one of the Kurile Islands, Zeleny Island, the largest of a set of islets called the Habomai Islands. The Soviets were outraged and ordered a retaliatory overflight of the Aleutian Islands. The Soviet Union also issued a formal diplomatic note of protest, which accused the United States of repeated penetrations of Soviet airspace. In the following September, the civilian airliner Korean Air Lines Flight 007 was downed by Soviet fighter jets over nearby Moneron Island.

In November 1983, NATO conducted a military exercise known as "Able Archer 83". The realistic simulation of a nuclear attack by NATO forces caused considerable alarm in the USSR and is regarded by many historians to be the closest the world came to nuclear war since the Cuban Missile Crisis.

This period of the Cold War would encompass the first term of American president Ronald Reagan (1981–1985), the death of Soviet leader Leonid Brezhnev in 1982, and the brief interim period of Soviet leadership consisting of Yuri Andropov (1982–1984) and Konstantin Chernenko (1984–1985). This phase in the Cold War concluded in 1985 with the ascension of reform-minded Soviet leader Mikhail Gorbachev who possessed a commitment to reduce tensions between the East and the West and to bring about major reforms in Soviet society.

While this period is sometimes referred to as the "New Cold War" or "Second Cold War," it is distinct from the increased geopolitical tensions in the 21st century that have been referred to by similar names.

== Prelude: A decade of detente ==
During the 1970s, the United States and the Soviet Union had pursued a policy of détente, whereby both sides trying to improve their geopolitical situation while minimizing the risk of direct war between the superpowers. Extensive trade ties were established between nations of both blocs, to the point that approximately 70 percent of the Soviet Union's grain came from the United States. In 1975, steps to expand political ties between NATO and Soviet-bloc nations (i.e. Ostpolitik) culminated in the signing of the Helsinki Accords. Additionally, several major arms control agreements were signed, such as SALT I & II.

Additionally, efforts were taken by the United States to secure a peace treaty to end its participation in the Vietnam War. To this end, Nixon attempted to induce China to support the peace process and proceeded to make a historic trip to the communist nation. While this outreach to China would ultimately fail to avert communist victory in the Vietnam War, it is still regarded one of the most important geopolitical acts of the 20th century, fundamentally altering the Cold War dynamic between the U.S. and the USSR.

While such efforts toward détente were generally supported by the publics of both sides (for example 68 percent of Americans believed that Nixon's China Trip would improve world peace) there were still critics of such efforts. In the United States, conservatives such as Barry Goldwater condemned détente, going on to say, "Our objective must be the destruction of the enemy as an ideological force possessing the means of power" and warning that trade with the Soviet Union assists in the maintenance of Soviet hegemony in Eastern Europe. American opposition to détente was also shared by members of the American left, such as Sen. Henry "Scoop" Jackson, who believed the Soviet Union needed to be aggressively confronted by the United States. Despite these criticisms, détente continued throughout the 1970s, enjoying support from members of both sides of the American political divide, with both parties nominating pro-détente candidates in the 1976 presidential election (President Ford vs. Governor Jimmy Carter.)

In Western Europe, there was also some opposition to détente. As a consequence of West German chancellor Willy Brandt's Ostpolitik, the West German government repudiated all claims east of the Oder-Niesse river, forfeiting claims historic German territory that had been lost at the end of World War II. While this move helped ease fears of German revanchism against the Soviet Union and Poland, it drew criticism from Brandt's chief opponent, the centre-right Christian Democratic Union (CDU.)

In the Soviet Union itself, dissidents such as Andrei Sakharov (also former member of the Soviet nuclear program), warned that Western security was threatened if détente wasn't accompanied by liberalization in the Soviet Union. Soviet and Eastern human rights activists came under renewed assault during this time period by communist intelligence services, such as the KGB. The absence of significant western criticism of continued human rights abuses resulted in rising discontent among Eastern European dissidents, with Czech playwright (and future president) Vachlav Havel labeling détente as "naive, thickheaded."

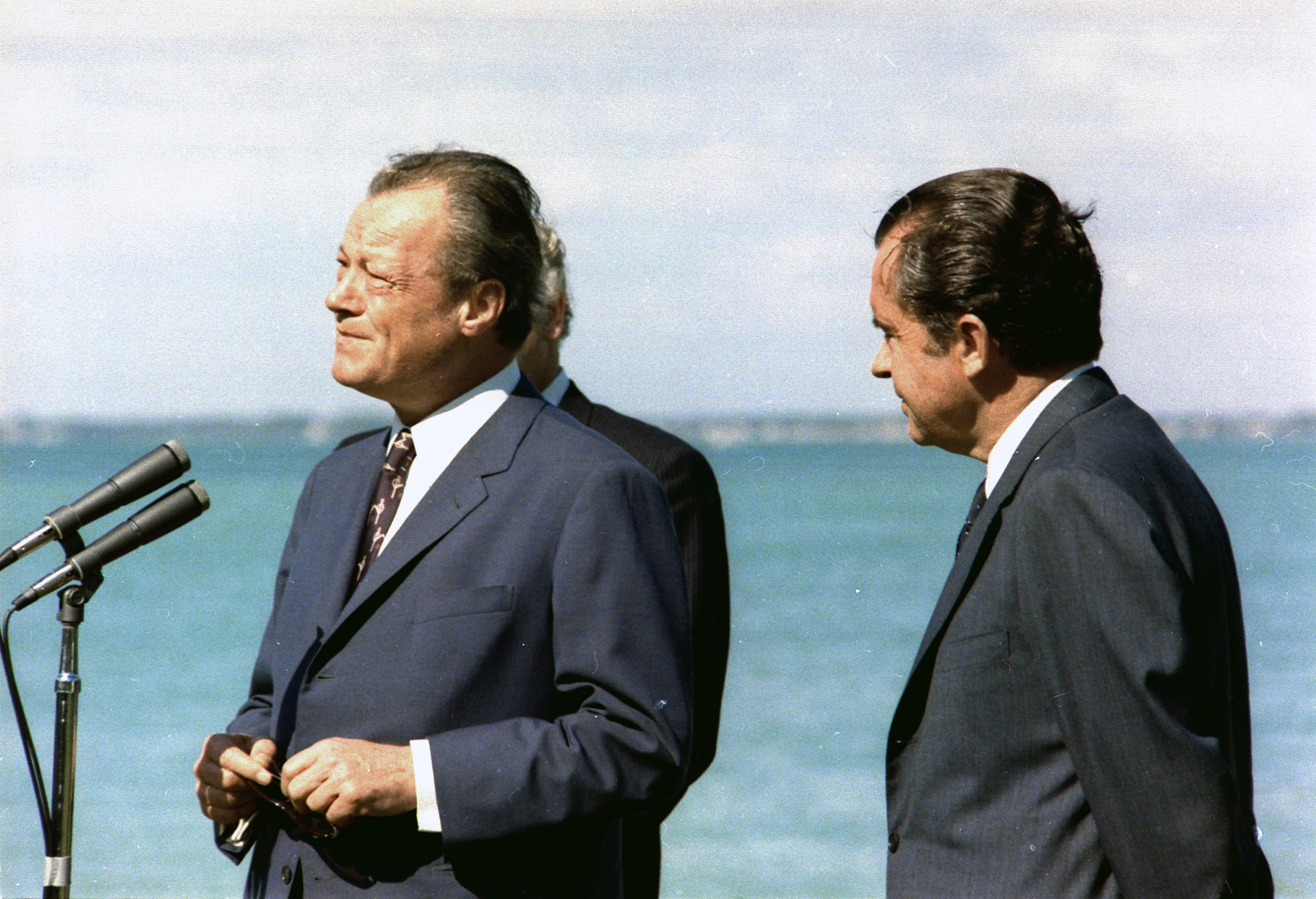
Chancellor Willy Brandt (left) with American president Richard Nixon (right.) The two statesmen were champions of détente and trade with the Eastern Bloc.

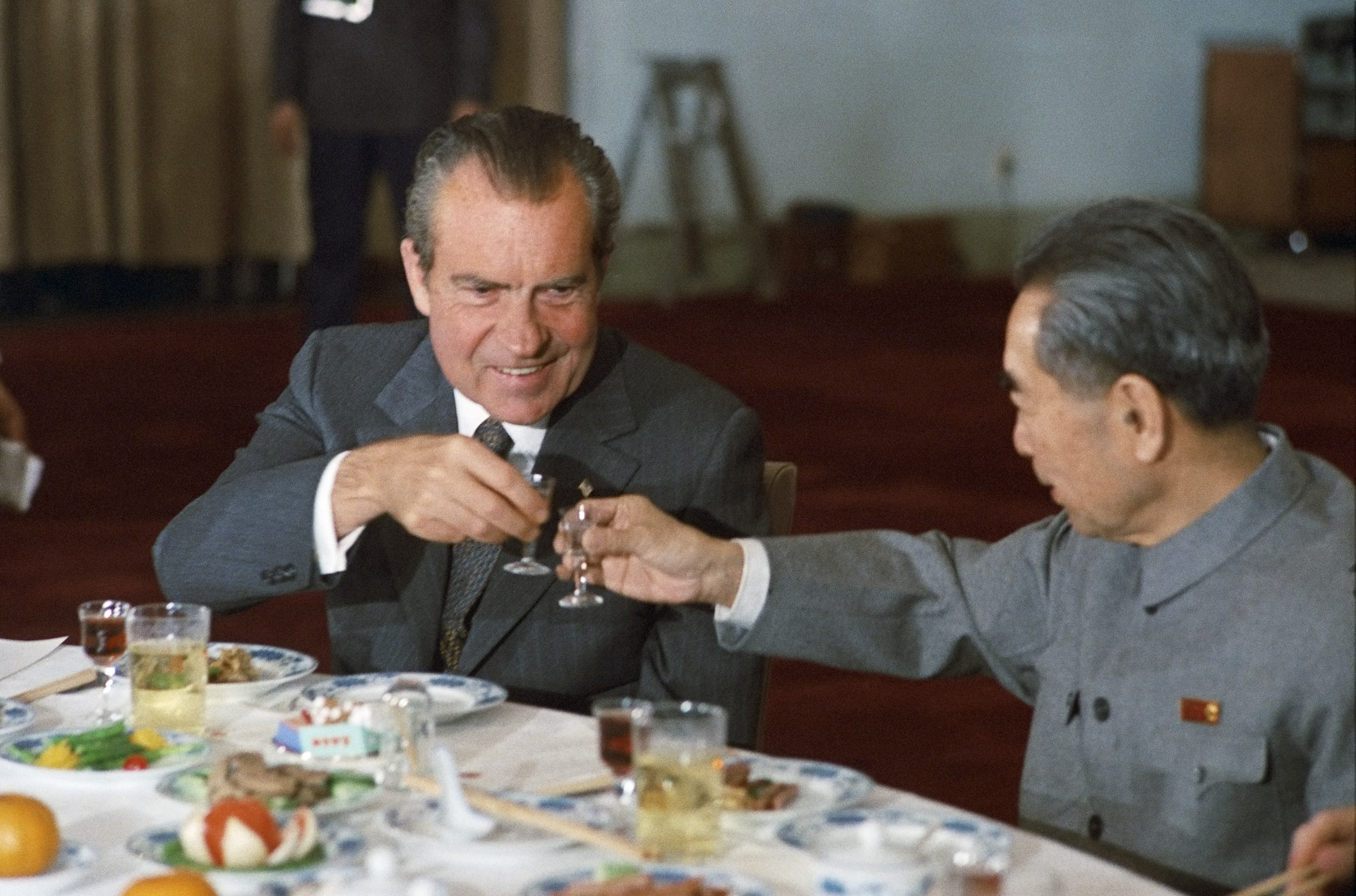
President Nixon and Chinese Premier Zhou Enlai toast one another during the former's visit to the People's Republic of China. The two are credited with forging a new axis in the Cold War out of mutual hostility to the Soviet Union.

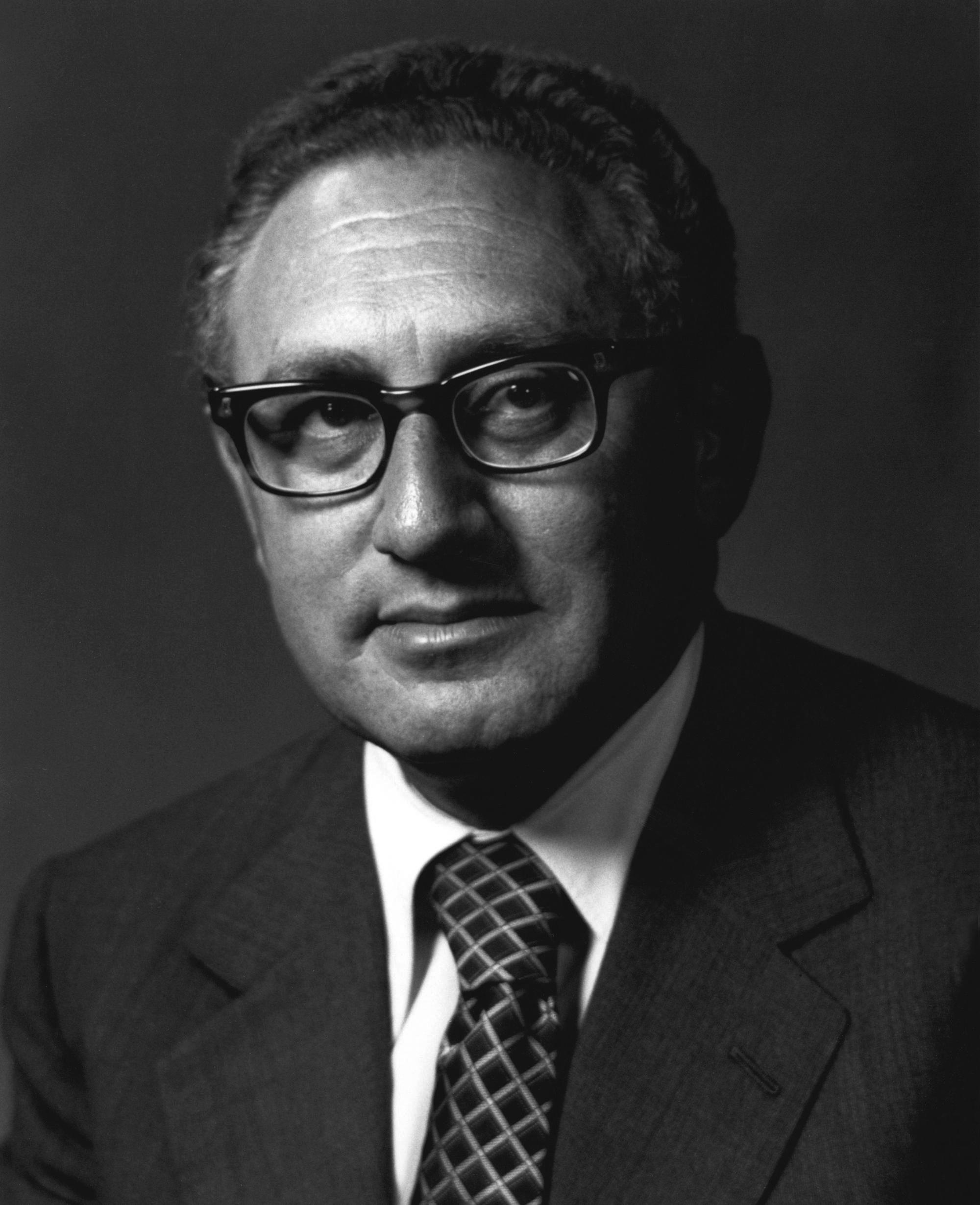
Secretary of State Dr. Henry Kissinger (right), is widely credited with playing a driving role in American foreign policy during the first half of the 1970s, particularly in regards to Cold War policy.

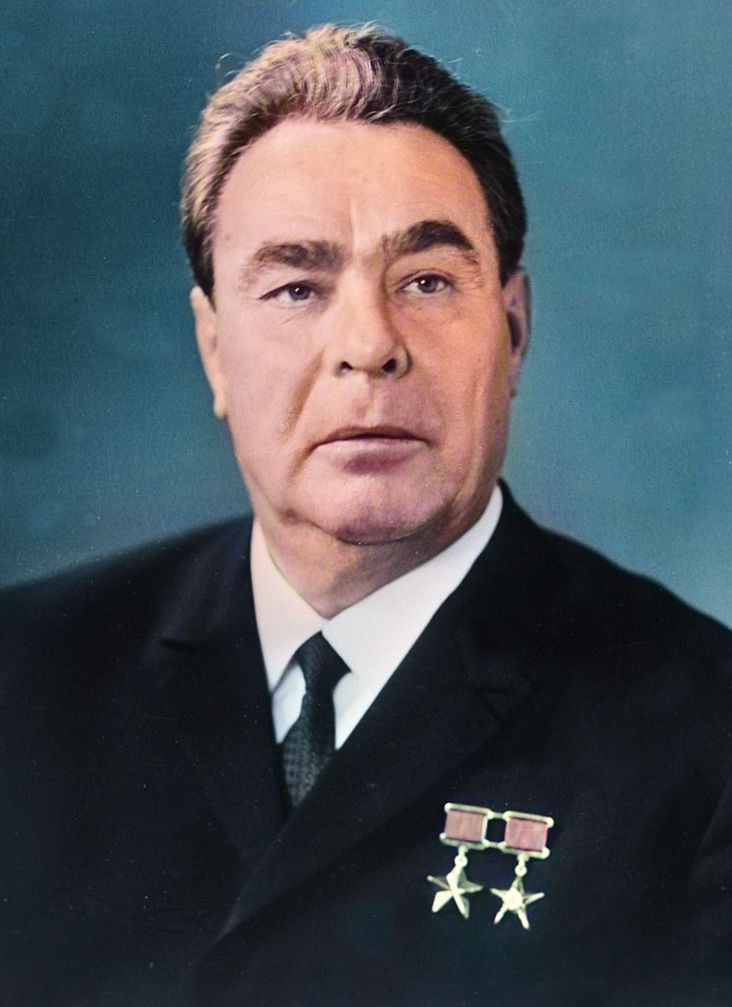
General Secretary Leonid Brezhnev, the de facto leader of the Soviet Union from 1964 to 1982, played the leading role in determining the communist world's foreign policy during this period.

== Collapse of détente ==
This era of relative cooperation wasn't without conflict. Throughout the era of détente, both sides continued their stockpiling of nuclear weapons, along with delivery systems for those weapons. The emergence of multiple independently targetable reentry vehicles (MIRVs) radically increased both the Soviet Union's and the United States' killing capacity in the event of a nuclear war and increased the possibility of a preventive strike. SALT II was signed in 1979 in an attempt to contain the expansion of MIRVs. However, this treaty wasn't ratified by the U.S. Senate due to the Soviet Invasion of Afghanistan in December of that year.

Both the Soviet Union and the United States had taken an interest in Afghanistan during the Cold War vying for influence in the neutral mountainous country. To this end, both the Soviet Union and the United States undertook massive infrastructure projects in the underdeveloped nation. So generous was superpower aid that the Afghan prime minister Mohammad Hashim Maiwandwal once said that, "he could light his American cigarettes with Russian matches."

Afghanistan witnessed a period of rising political instability that began with the overthrow of King Zahir Shah in 1973. During the period, Afghanistan witnessed a massive growth in the size of its communist movement, particularly in the ranks of the Afghan military. This culminated in the 1978 Saur Revolution, where by members of the People's Democratic Party of Afghanistan, a Soviet-backed Marxist–Leninist party, seized power in a bloody coup.

The communists initiated a radical social and political revolution which saw the liquidation of large numbers of dissidents and "class enemies." The coup and subsequent political violence provoked a civil war between the Marxist state and its non-communist opponents, which included, among others, radical Islamists. The deterioration of the communists military position prompted the Soviet Union to intervene in the conflict. The entrance of the Soviet Union into the Afghanistan War is widely credited with ending support for détente and provoked a series of retaliatory responses from the United States, such as the aforementioned withdrawal from SALT II, as well as the imposition of a grain embargo, the boycotting of the 1980 Moscow Summer Olympics, and the beginning of weapons sales to Afghan anti-Soviet rebels. Additionally, it diplomatically isolated the Soviet Union on the world stage, particularly in the Middle East.

The election of Ronald Reagan is widely heralded as a turning point in the relationship between the United States and the Soviet Union. According to Henry Kissinger, Reagan was "the first postwar President to take the offensive both ideologically and strategically." While Carter had initiated a military buildup after the Soviet intervention in Afghanistan, it would be under the Reagan Administration that the United States would aggressively buildup its conventional and nuclear stockpile, marking a renewed period of competition in place of cooperation.

== Rollback doctrine ==
In 1984, journalist Nicholas Lemann interviewed Reagan secretary of defense Caspar Weinberger and summarized the strategy of the Reagan administration to roll back the Soviet Union:

Their society is economically weak, and it lacks the wealth, education, and technology to enter the information age. They have thrown everything into military production, and their society is starting to show terrible stress as a result. They can't sustain military production the way we can. Eventually it will break them, and then there will be just one superpower in a safe world — if, only if, we can keep spending."

Lemann notes that when he wrote that in 1984, he thought the Reaganites were living in a fantasy world. But in 2016, he says, that passage represents "a fairly uncontroversial description of what Reagan actually did."

The Reagan strategy also included escalating conflicts the Soviets were involved in, especially the Soviet–Afghan War and the Central American crisis. It included diplomatic moves to persuade Western European governments to host American missiles pointed at the Soviet Union. Additionally, it included an attempt to construct a space based anti-ballistic missile defense known as the Strategic Defense Initiative (However many critics dubbed it "Star Wars.")

The strategies were continued until the Revolutions of 1989. People in the Eastern European satellite states revolted against their dictatorships and became parliamentary democracies. The Russian people ended their communist system in 1991. Without support from Moscow, many subsidized communist movements in the Asia, Africa, and Latin America virtually collapsed. In the 21st century, only China, Vietnam, Laos and Cuba remain.

== Polish crisis (1980–1981) ==
In the 1970s, the Polish economy had experienced a period of declining productivity, culminating in the nation's first post-WWII recession in 1979. In 1980, striking workers at the Gdansk Shipyard announced the formation of Solidarity, a non-communist trade union. On August 31, 1980, the Polish government agreed to many of the union's demands, including its legalization, making Solidarity (now 10 million members strong) the first trade union in the Warsaw Pact to not be under the control of the communist government.

Throughout the following year, Poland experienced growing political chaos as the Solidarity protests spread across the country, threatening the survival of the communist state. On December 13, 1981, General Jaruzelski, head of the Polish military, declared a state of martial law across Poland, ordering the arrest of members of Solidarity and other opposition organizations.

During the period leading up to the declaration of martial law by Poland's government, there was speculation on both sides of the Iron Curtain about the specter of a Soviet military intervention in the crisis, similar to previous Soviet interventions in Eastern Europe (i.e. Hungarian Revolution, Prague Spring.) However, the Soviets ultimately decided against direct intervention in Poland out of fear of western economic sanctions on the Soviet Union.

Poland would remain in a state of martial law until 1984, when the Polish government began gradually releasing members of the Polish opposition from prison. The conflict between Solidarity and the Jaruzelski government would ultimately come to an end in 1989, with the democratization of Poland and the defeat of the ruling communist party in Poland's first free post-World War II elections.

== Nuclear buildup (1981–1983) ==
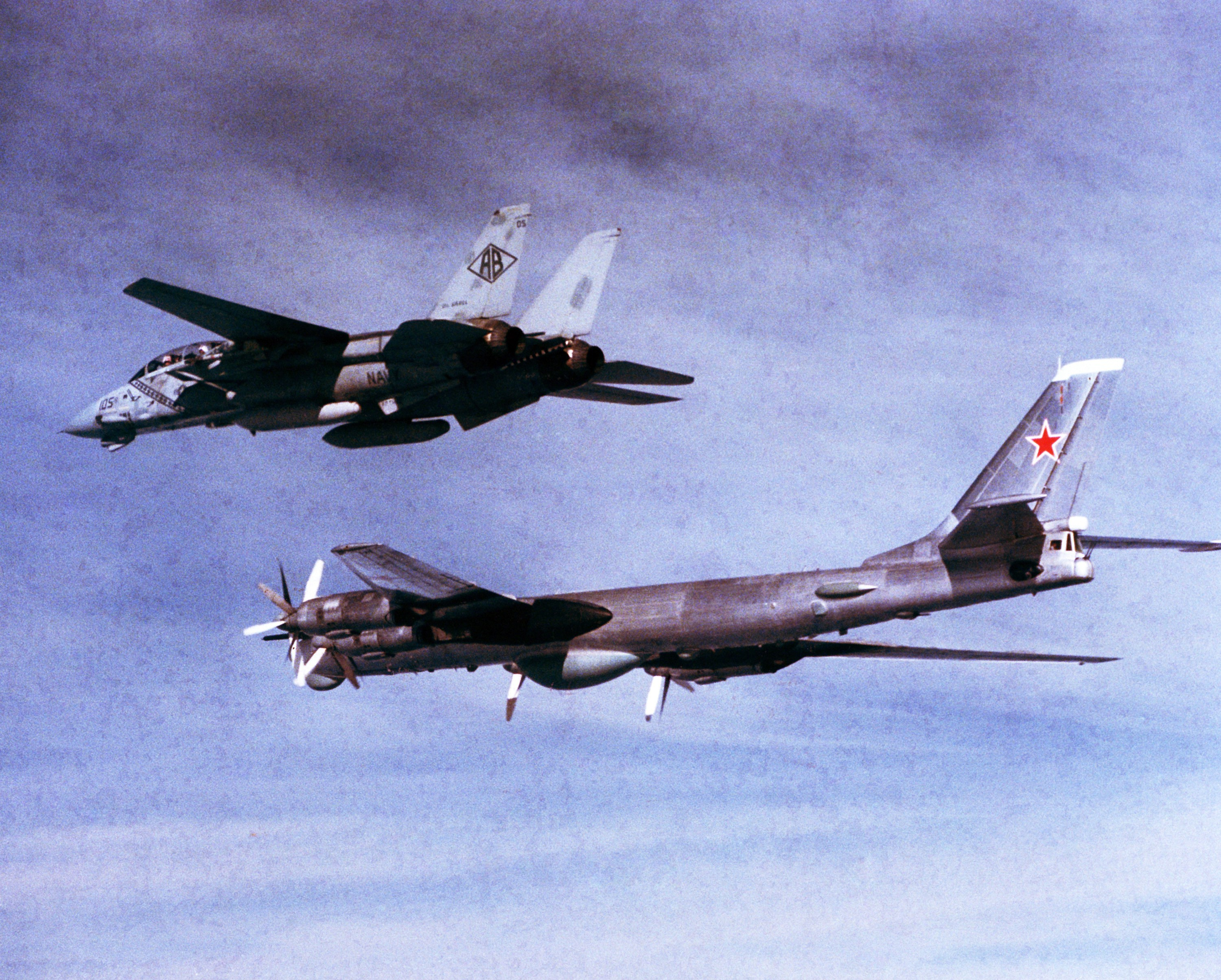
Soviet Tupolev Tu-95 escorted by a United States Navy Grumman F-14 Tomcat over the North Atlantic, 1 September 1985.

=== Deployment of Intermediate Nuclear Forces to Europe ===
During the 1970s, the Soviet Union had developed a new class of intermediate range ballistic missiles capable of carrying nuclear weapons. By the end of 1979, it deployed 130 SS-20 missiles capable of launching over 390 warheads to the western part of the Soviet Union and to allied Warsaw Pact states. This move set off alarms in the NATO alliance, which was dependent upon tactical nuclear superiority to offset the Soviets conventional superiority.

In order to enhance the nuclear deterrence of the NATO alliance, member states committed to deploy several hundred missiles to Western Europe, mainly Pershing II.

=== Technological developments ===
During the Cold War prior to the 1970s and 1980s, the primary heavy strategic bomber of the United States Air Force was the B-52 Stratofortress. However, the development of more sophisticated Airborne Early Warning and Control (AWACS) technology rendered the B-52 more vulnerable to attacks from the ground and enemy fighters. The Air Force saw a need for a bomber that could go faster, was more maneuverable, and could still deliver a substantial payload to its target. This led to the development of the B-1A Lancer in the early to mid 1970s. The B-1A program was cancelled in 1977 but was later brought back by President Ronald Reagan in 1981 under its new and current designation, the B-1B. The B-1B is capable of speeds at or above Mach 1.2 and can deliver a payload of 75,000 pounds. The Lancer was a nuclear capable bomber until 1994 when the nuclear mission for the bomber was cancelled, and it was switched to conventional weapons.

Another weapon that was produced during this time frame was the Pershing II medium-range ballistic missile (MRBM). The Pershing II was first deployed in Europe in 1983. It had a range of around 1,000 miles and carried a single W-85 variable yield nuclear warhead, which had a yield between five and 80 kilotons. Although this warhead has a smaller yield than the W-50 warhead (up to 150 kilotons), the increased accuracy of the Pershing II missile meant that there was not a need for large yield warheads. Instead, the missile was capable of striking very close to its target using its radar and inertial guidance units.

=== Nuclear false alarms and close calls ===
"Never, perhaps, in the postwar decades has the situation in the world been as explosive and, hence, more difficult and unfavorable as in the first half of the 1980s." - Mikhail Gorbachev, February 1986

One of the closest calls during this period of the Cold War happened during the Able Archer exercise performed by the North Atlantic Treaty Organization (NATO) in 1983. Able Archer 83 was a realistic military simulation exercise performed in November 1983. As part of the exercise, the NATO forces simulated a full-scale nuclear assault which may have invoked an unexpected response from the Soviet Union. After they had received information on what appeared to be a mobilization of NATO forces in Europe, many military officials in the Soviet Union believed that the United States was using the exercise to disguise a strategic nuclear first strike. This led to an unusual response from the Soviet Union. This response involved Soviet military units in East Germany and Poland being put on alert and an abnormal number of reconnaissance flights.

=== Anti-nuclear and peace movements ===
Throughout the 1970s and 1980s, the general public became increasingly concerned with the continuous and growing threat of war and nuclear war in particular, and the - by then - international peace and anti-nuclear movements grew dramatically with many protests, happenings and activist events to spread awareness and push for disarmaments and change political agendas. The movements were most active in Europe, the US, Canada and Japan and a culmination was reached in 1982, June 12, when a million people marched in New York for an end to the Cold War arms race and nuclear weapons. It is the largest gathering of protesters in American history.

== Third World conflicts ==
=== Middle East ===
The Middle East saw several conflicts during this era. The Iran–Iraq War pitted the new Islamic revolutionary government of Iran against the Iraqi Baathist state led by Saddam Hussein. Despite fighting an Iraq that was armed by both the Soviet Union and the West, Iran fought the invaders to a standstill. The war remained a stalemate until 1988, when a status quo ante-bellum cease-fire was arranged between the two parties. The war had claimed the lives of over a million people.

The era also saw the continuation of the Lebanese Civil War (1975–1990), with the American-backed Israelis and the Soviet-backed Syrians fighting alongside various Lebanese political factions that they in turn supported.

=== Africa ===
In Africa, neither the Soviet Union nor the United States got directly involved in the numerous conflicts raging on the continent. However, several African civil wars turned into proxy wars involving foreign powers, with South African and Cuban soldiers fighting one another in the Angolan Civil War. Other conflicts in Africa were the Ethiopian Civil War, the Mozambican Civil War, the Second Sudanese Civil War and the Somali Rebellion. This combined with a total of 20 successful coups meant that Africa was a continued source of instability throughout the 1980s.

Along with the various military confrontations going on across the continent, South Africa, then still under the control the apartheid government, faced increasing isolation due to both its domestic repression of the indigenous black population and its assertive foreign policy. Soviet-bloc states continued their sponsorship of the ANC and other anti-Apartheid movements sending both lethal and non-lethal aid. South Africa witnessed increasing instability as both civil disobedience and militant violence against the white-minority government intensified. In western countries, such as the United States, there was a growing movement calling for the suspension of economic relations with South Africa, often referred to as the Disinvestment Movement. While the movement failed to bring about an immediate end to Western trade with South Africa, by the end of the decade the United States Congress would pass (over President Reagan's veto) the Comprehensive Anti-Apartheid Act, which combined with other nations taking similar measures, would strike a major blow to the South African economy.

=== South and Central Asia ===
The early 1980s saw a continued Afghan resistance to the Soviet invasion. Pakistan, the United States, United Kingdom, Saudi Arabia and other anti-Soviet nations provided material assistance to the Afghan rebels, who were often referred to as the Mujahideen (Arabic for "holy warriors"). The United States provided approximately $750 million year to the Afghan rebels, largely via the CIA. However the CIA had little direct contact with the Mujahideen as Pakistan's ISI was the main contact and handler. The ISI trained 80,000 fighters against the Soviet Union in Afghanistan. This support for the Afghan rebels, which would ultimately go onto include sales of anti-aircraft "Stinger" missiles, is widely considered as being instrumental in denying the Soviet Union and the Democratic Republic of Afghanistan they backed victory in Afghanistan.

=== Southeast Asia ===
==== Yellow Rain ====
In 1981, the United States government alleged that Soviet-aligned forces had employed chemical weapons in Afghanistan, Laos, and Kampuchea (Cambodia). The substance reportedly used in the attacks was T-2 mycotoxin, a trichothecene mycotoxin said to have been deployed in the "Yellow Rain" attacks in the three countries. According to U.S. claims, the agent may have been delivered through a variety of means, including aircraft-mounted rockets and bombs, spray tanks, mortar shells, grenades, and booby traps.

According to U.S. claims, these chemical agents were either supplied or directly deployed by the Soviets. They were reportedly used in at least some of more than 400 attacks and were alleged to have contributed to a portion of the more than ten thousand deaths associated with these incidents. The symptoms attributed to exposure to the alleged agent were severe. Reported effects included vomiting, neurological damage, irritation of the skin and eyes, visual impairment or blindness, and diarrhea.

The Soviets denied the allegations, and an initial investigation conducted under the United Nations investigation was inconclusive. Subsequently, samples purported to contain the chemical agent were supplied to a group of independent scientists for analysis. Their findings indicated that the material consisted of honeybee feces, composed of digested pollen grains. This led to the alternative explanation that the phenomenon resulted from the mass defecation of pollen from large swarms of bees rather than from the deployment of chemical weapons.

==== Cambodian–Vietnamese War ====
Following a few years of armed exchanges between the Soviet Union backed Vietnamese and the Chinese backed Cambodian armies, Vietnam launched a full-scale invasion of Cambodia on Christmas Day in 1978. The decision to invade Cambodia was instigated by Cambodia from their many attacks on the Vietnamese, which peaked in 1977–78.

==== Malaysian communist insurgencies ====
8 years after the end of the first insurgency, the Malayan Communist Party (MCP) launched a second insurgency campaign against the Malaysian government on June 17, 1968, with an attack that killed 17 members of security forces near Kroh-Bentong. By 1970, infighting began to arise within the MCP. It was believed that government spies had infiltrated the MCP and began working to divide the group, with many members of the MCP accusing each other of working with the government, and if they were found to be government agents, would usually be put to death. By late 1974, the government agents' actions had proved successful; the MCP had weakened from its splinter into three factions in 1970, and by 1987 the last remaining groups surrendered and the Hat Yai peace accords between the MCP and the Malaysian government was signed in 1989, marking the end of the MCP's insurgency. The MCP's cessation of fighting would lead to a similar peace accord signed between the North Kalimantan Communist Party (NKCP) and the Malaysian government in 1990, ending 28 years of communist hostilities against the Crown Colony government and Malaysian government in Sarawak.

=== Latin America ===
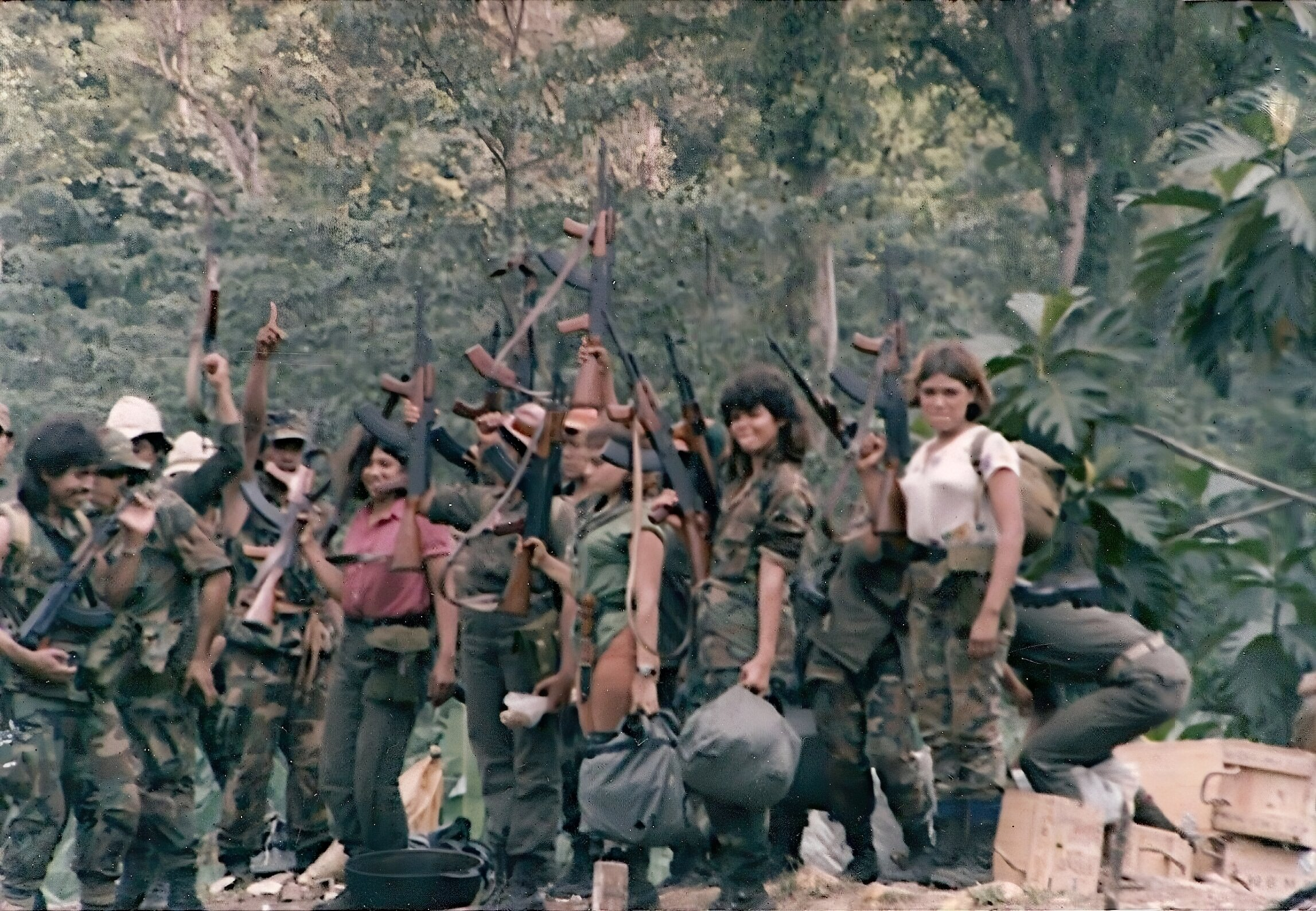
The Contras mounted an effective insurgency that threatened the Sandinista government's hold of the countryside.

The year 1979 witnessed the overthrow of the ruling Somoza family in Nicaragua and their subsequent replacement by the left-wing Sandinista movement, led by Daniel Ortega. The incoming Reagan Administration was committed to the removal of the Nicaraguan government and armed anti-communist revolutionary forces, commonly referred to as the "Contras." In late 1983, the United States Congress limited the Reagan Administration to only $24 million in aid for the Contras. The attempts by members the Reagan Administration to illegally circumvent these restrictions resulted in the Iran-Contra Scandal.

Concerned that Nicaragua was the first "domino" to fall in Central America, the United States increased arms sales to friendly governments in Honduras, Guatemala, and El Salvador, each of whom were dealing with their own leftist-insurgencies. US aid peaked in 1985 at $1.2 billion before declining to a mere $167 million by 1996 (almost all of the latter was non-military aid.)

In 1983 the United States invaded Grenada in which the Cuban-backed People's Revolutionary Government was toppled.

Colombia witnessed the continuation of their several decade long civil war with the American-backed government of Julio Cesar Turbay Ayala fighting various Marxist rebels and drug smugglers. The dominant rebel group, Revolutionary Armed Forces of Colombia (FARC), received financial and material support from the Cuban government.

None of these conflicts would be resolved by the midpoint of the decade, lasting until the early 1990s, or in the case of the FARC insurgency, until 2017.

== 1983: The year of crisis ==
=== Operation RYAN ===
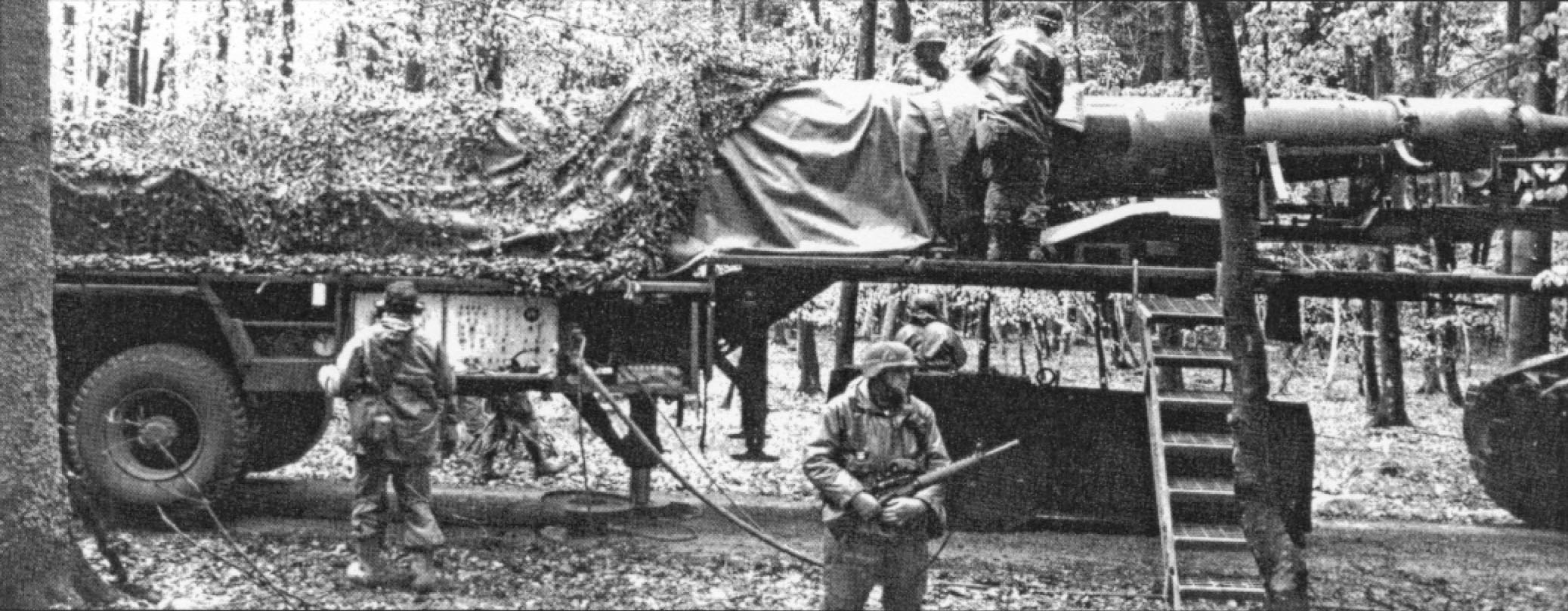
Pershing II intermediate-range ballistic missile on an erector launcher in Germany.

In 1981, the Chairman of the KGB, Yuri Andropov, and General Secretary Leonid Brezhnev launched the largest ever Soviet intelligence gathering campaign, Operation RYAN (Russian: Raketno Yadernoye Napadenie (Ракетно ядерное нападение), meaning "nuclear missile attack"). The purpose of this exercise was to deploy operatives to collect as much information as possible on the possibility of a nuclear first strike from the U.S. or other NATO powers.

This eight year watchdog initiative seemed to unnerve rather than reassure the USSR. With all of the information flowing in, it was unclear which piece of intelligence marked the initiation of a preemptive strike, which would call for immediate action from the Soviet side, before the U.S. could even get weapons in the air. When the U.S. rolled out a new class of intermediate-range ballistic missiles, the Pershing II, the KGB knew that the Americans were ready to strike, and if it was a preemptive strike, the Soviet arsenal of retaliatory weapons would be at a high risk. In February 1983, the KGB doubled down on Operation RYAN, focusing on any possible indication of a U.S. plan to attack and exponentially increasing tensions.

=== Shootdown of KAL 007 ===
Korean Air Lines flight 007 (KAL-007) was headed toward Seoul, South Korea, from Anchorage, Alaska, on September 1, 1983. On its way, the flight passed over the Soviet Kamchatka Peninsula, which was not a part of the flight plan. Soviet fighters launched air-to-air missiles and shot down the passenger plane under orders from Soviet commanders. KAL-007 crashed into the Pacific Ocean, and the 269 passengers on board died. Among the dead was Larry McDonald, a US congressman from Georgia.

The timing of this event along with the multiple other conflicts between the U.S. and the Soviet Union in 1983 created a political climate of high tension which could have quickly escalated to disastrous actions by either side in response.

=== Exercise Able Archer 83 ===
Just as the USSR intensified its scrutiny of nuclear activity through Operation RYAN, the U.S. and NATO began their most advanced, in-depth, and realistic war simulation yet, known as Able Archer. Launched in November 1983, what made this particular war-game so different, and ultimately so consequential, was the inclusion of an end-game scenario that simulated the nuclear option should the war reach such a level.

Soviet intelligence was able to gather that this new aspect had been included, but they were unable to tell whether or not it was all part of the game, or if there was a potential threat of actual nuclear weapons being released. This escalation in the type of simulation being performed by NATO combined with the presence of Pershing II missiles in West Germany put the USSR on edge. On top of a reported increase in communications from Warsaw forces in East Germany, there was an unusually high number of surveillance flights and large numbers of armed and ready Mig-23s were stationed near the border. Reports from Soviet sources also claim that certain forces were placed on high alert and multiple SS-20 and SS–19 mobile strategic nuclear missiles were moved and waiting.

Many scholars list this event as the closest the world came to nuclear war since the Cuban Missile Crisis, while others argue that the USSR's actions were not far from standard operating procedure during NATO war-games, perhaps erring on the side of caution due to the presence of the new Pershing II missiles. Most agree that the accumulating effects of this event and so many others in such a short period caused 1983 to be one of the most intense and nearly disastrous years of the Cold War.

== Soviet leadership and succession ==
=== Death of Brezhnev (1982) ===
Leonid Brezhnev was the Soviet Union's leader for 18 years from 1964 until his death in 1982. Brezhnev's health was starting to decline due to his heavy smoking and addiction to sleeping pills toward the end of his time leading the Soviet Union. When Brezhnev's health got worse, the Soviet Union started having issues because he could not run the country.

Brezhnev tried to help lower nuclear tensions between the Soviet Union and the United States. In 1979, Brezhnev and United States president Jimmy Carter signed the SALT II agreement. The agreement was a new bilateral strategic arms limitation treaty. However, on December 27, 1979, the Soviet Union invaded Afghanistan, so the United States Senate never ratified the treaty. Hafizullah Amin played a large role in the Soviet Union invading Afghanistan. Amin's relationship with the Soviet Union was decent but was eventually strained, which was one reason the Soviet Union invaded Afghanistan.

Brezhnev's policies helped the Soviet Union's economy to grow and compete with the United States in an arms race during the 1970s. The 1980s was a different story. Because of Brezhnev's poor health, he could not lead the Soviet Union, which hurt the country's economy, military, living standards, and politics. Brezhnev had to start relying more on his advisors because of his health. Brezhnev's advisors would make critical decisions, and Brezhnev eventually became a figurehead for the Soviet Union. However, political corruption spread throughout the Soviet leadership. Brezhnev was eventually criticized for the poor quality of life the Soviet Union's citizens had in the late 1970s and early 1980s.

=== The Andropov era (1982–1984) ===
Yuri V. Andropov succeeded Leonid Brezhnev as Soviet leader. His leadership was short lived, however, due to his failing health; he was only the Soviet Union's leader for 15 months. From November 1982 to February 1984. Andropov quickly fell ill in February 1983, and his health deteriorated to the point he began staying in a hospital frequently. On November 7, 1983, he became the first Soviet leader to miss the annual October Revolution parade on Red Square. Andropov spent his last few days in a hospital before he died on February 9, 1984.

Andropov wanted to clean up Soviet corruption and attempted systemic reform. He dismissed many party ministers and secretaries due to their corruption. Andropov also established the Soviet Union's rational state-society relations, which was designed to create resistance from both the elites and the masses. The statists' plan did not work because Andropov died, and the plan alone did not have the strength to be successful.

Toward the end of his life, Andropov began to think the Soviet Union's intervention in Afghanistan might have been an erroneous decision. He believed it was not in the Soviet Union's best interest, and he gave four main reasons to UN Secretary Javier Pérez de Cuéllar as to why the invasion is not important. Andropov even visited Afghanistan toward the end of 1981 and the beginning of 1982, but he realized that there was no military solution. Andropov's response was putting pressure on Afghanistan's leadership, so the Soviet Union could withdraw without having many problems. Andropov's death meant his vision for Afghanistan would never materialize.

Andropov wanted to fix the Soviet economy as it was struggling toward the end of Brezhnev's leadership. Gosplan Baibakov presented the 1983 annual plan of economic and social development, and V. F. Garbuzov presented the economic performance of 1982 for the 1983 budget. After listening to these two plans, Andropov had several ideas on how to improve the Soviet economy, especially through agriculture and agricultural workers. Andropov also wanted the industrial ministry and other ministries to meet their target plans.

The Soviet Union had domestic and foreign problems with its economy, which worried Soviet leaders. Andropov did agree with some parts of Brezhnev's foreign policies, but he also wanted to create better ones. The Soviet Union's leaders also struggled to find different ways to solve multiple problems. Andropov's death meant his economic vision was never fully developed.

=== Chernenko's reign (1984–1985) ===
After Yuri Andropov's death, Konstantin Chernenko was elected as the next leader for the Soviet Union. Andropov had not wanted Chernenko to become his successor because Chernenko had emphysema and health issues. Instead, Andropov's preferred choice for his successor was Mikhail Gorbachev. Chernenko's reign was even shorter than Andropov's, lasting only 13 months from February 1984 to March 1985.

Leonid Brezhnev had helped Chernenko move higher in the political ranks. Chernenko followed some of Brezhnev's economic ideals, but he was not open about his economic development plans. Chernenko wanted to improve the Soviet Union's agriculture methods, production and distribution to help jump start the economy.

One of Chernenko's major achievements was negotiating and signing a new trade pact with China, worth $1.2 billion. This also helped to ease the relationship between the Soviet Union and China. The trade protocol allowed a 50 percent commerce increase between the Soviet Union and China, but it also allowed the Soviet Union to export machinery, cars and timber.

Chernenko also did some work to help improve the relationship between the Soviet Union and the United States. After the Soviet Union ended the intermediate-range nuclear force negotiations in Geneva, all strategic arm talks ceased and neither side talked to the other for the next 12 months. Nonetheless, Chernenko contacted recently re-elected president Ronald Reagan to reopen negotiations and met him in Geneva, on January 7, 1985. After two long days of negotiation, both sides agreed to "resume formal negotiations on the basis of a new framework." This was a new advance in the Soviet Union and the United States' relationship because it addressed questions regarding both nuclear and space weapons. This new agreement was one way Chernenko helped the Soviet Union's relationship with the United States. However, Chernenko did not end the Soviet War in Afghanistan, which could have started the process to end the Cold War.

Even after the agreement between the Soviet Union and the United States, the Soviet Union was still boycotting the 1984 Summer Olympics where the United States was hosting the Olympic Games in Los Angeles. The Soviet Union said the Reagan administration could not ensure the Soviet athletes' security. The Soviet National Olympic Committee also felt its participants would have poor training conditions.

The Soviet Union's boycott of the 1984 Summer Olympics was also a direct response to the United States' boycott to the 1980 Summer Olympics, which the Soviet Union hosted in Moscow. The United States and other countries were boycotting the Soviet Union because of the Afghanistan invasion. But Chernenko continued Soviet intervention in Afghanistan even after the United States' 1980 Summer Olympics boycott. Chernenko's Soviet Union and Reagan's United States still had disagreements, so the Cold War could not end before Chernenko died.

== Culture and media ==
Dozens of board wargames have been published, covering both historical and hypothetical conflicts at scales ranging from man-to-man to global thermonuclear war. Historical conflicts include the Falklands War, the Iran–Iraq War, the invasion of Grenada, and the Angolan Civil War. The vast majority of titles concerned contemporary World War III "what-if" scenarios wherein the Cold War turns hot, and focused on a presumed Warsaw Pact invasion of Western Europe. Notable games include Ultimatum (1979), The China War (1979), NATO Division Commander (1980), Fifth Corps series (1980), and MechWar 2 (1980), Task Force (1981), Harpoon (1983), Silo 14 (1983), Assault series (1983), Gulf Strike (1983), Firepower (1984), The Third World War series (1984), Air Cav (1985) and Main Battle Area (1985).

In addition, the period witnessed the release of several video games dealing with the Cold War and Cold War related issues. Examples include Atari's well-known arcade game Missile Command (1980); the somewhat infamous Raid over Moscow (1984), which lets the player blast through Soviet air defence and finally destroy Moscow (hence the name); and Theatre Europe (1985), which simulates an all-out conventional, albeit hypothetical, war between the Warsaw Pact forces and NATO troops over control of Central Europe. Some of these games advise strongly against the use of nuclear weapons, reflecting a widespread fear of nuclear holocaust at the time. Several other video games focused on Cold War geopolitics, such as Balance of Power (1985) and Crisis in the Kremlin (1991).

Two films released in 1983, WarGames and The Day After, dealt with potential all-out nuclear war between the US and the Soviet Union. President Reagan was given a private screening of The Day After and was said to have been deeply affected by it. He revised his posture toward nuclear arms in favor of eventual nuclear abolition, at least in part due to his experience watching the film.

References to the tensions were also a popular theme in songs at the time. In her 1982 Eurovision Song Contest-winning song "Ein bißchen Frieden", Nicole Hohloch sang about the fear of war that many people experienced at the time. In 1983, Nena sang in "99 Luftballons" about a scenario with balloons flying through the sky, causing a war, leaving Earth in ruins. In their 1984 hit song "Forever Young", Alphaville sang of living in a world with nuclear weapons.

== See also ==
- Brezhnev Doctrine
- Culture during the Cold War
- History of the Soviet Union (1964–1982)
- History of the Soviet Union (1982–1991)
- History of the United States (1980–1991)
- Political violence in Turkey (1976–1980)
- Reagan Doctrine
- Timeline of events in the Cold War

== Sources ==
- Ball, S. J. The Cold War: An International History, 1947–1991 (1998), a British perspective
- Beschloss, Michael, and Strobe Talbott. At the Highest Levels:The Inside Story of the End of the Cold War (1993)
- Bialer, Seweryn and Michael Mandelbaum, eds. Gorbachev's Russia and American Foreign Policy (1988).
- Brzezinski, Zbigniew. Power and Principle: Memoirs of the National Security Adviser, 1977–1981 (1983);
- Edmonds, Robin. Soviet Foreign Policy: The Brezhnev Years (1983)
- Gaddis, John Lewis. Long Peace: Inquiries into the History of the Cold War (1987, 1989)
- Gaddis, John Lewis. The United States and the End of the Cold War: Implications, Reconsiderations, Provocations (1992)
- Gaddis, John Lewis and LaFeber, Walter. America, Russia, and the Cold War, 1945–1992 7th ed. (1993)
- Gaddis, John Lewis. The Cold War: A New History (2005)
- Garthoff, Raymond. The Great Transition:American-Soviet Relations and the End of the Cold War (1994)
- Halliday, Fred. The Making of the Second Cold War (1983, Verso, London).
- Heuser, Beatrice. "The Soviet response to the Euromissile crisis, 1982–83", in Leopoldo Nuti (ed): Reheating the Cold War: From Vietnam to Gorbachev, 1975–1985 (London: Routledge, 2008), ISBN 978-0-415-46051-4, pp. 137–149.
- Hogan, Michael ed. The End of the Cold War. Its Meaning and Implications (1992) articles from Diplomatic History online at JSTOR
- Kyvig, David ed. Reagan and the World (1990)
- Matlock, Jack F. Autopsy on an Empire (1995) by US ambassador to Moscow
- Mower, A. Glenn Jr. Human Rights and American Foreign Policy: The Carter and Reagan Experiences ( 1987),
- Powaski, Ronald E. The Cold War: The United States and the Soviet Union, 1917–1991 (1998)
- Shultz, George P. Turmoil and Triumph: My Years as Secretary of State (1993)
- Sivachev, Nikolai and Nikolai Yakolev, Russia and the United States (1979), by Soviet historians
- Smith, Gaddis. Morality, Reason and Power:American Diplomacy in the Carter Years (1986).
- Westad, Odd Arne The Global Cold War: Third World Interventions and the Making of Our Times (2006) ISBN 0-521-85364-8
