= Benjamin Fischer (historian) =

American historian (born 1946)

Benjamin B. Fischer
- Born: September 1946 (age 80)
- Known for: CIA chief historian

Academic background
- Education: Columbia University, Cornell University

Academic work
- Discipline: History
- Sub-discipline: Eastern European and Soviet Union affairs; intelligence
- Institutions: CIA Center for the Study of Intelligence

Benjamin B. Fischer (born September 1946) is an American historian specializing in eastern European and Soviet history. He was chief historian for the United States Central Intelligence Agency (CIA), working as an officer at the agency for 34 years prior to his retirement.

Fischer is a graduate of Cornell University and Columbia University. During his CIA career, he worked for nine years in the agency’s Directorate of Intelligence as an analyst of Soviet issues, for 15 years in the Directorate of Operations in the United States and abroad, and for 10 years on the history staff of the CIA’s Center for the Study of Intelligence, culminating as chief historian.

The White House Millennium Council selected his monograph At Cold War's End: US Intelligence on the Soviet Union and Eastern Europe, 1989–1991 (1999) for inclusion in a time capsule at the National Archives to be opened in 2100. In 2002, Fischer was a visiting research fellow at the Norwegian Nobel Institute in Oslo. He was interviewed in the 2021 Netflix series Spycraft.
