= Leonard H. Perroots =

United States Air Force general

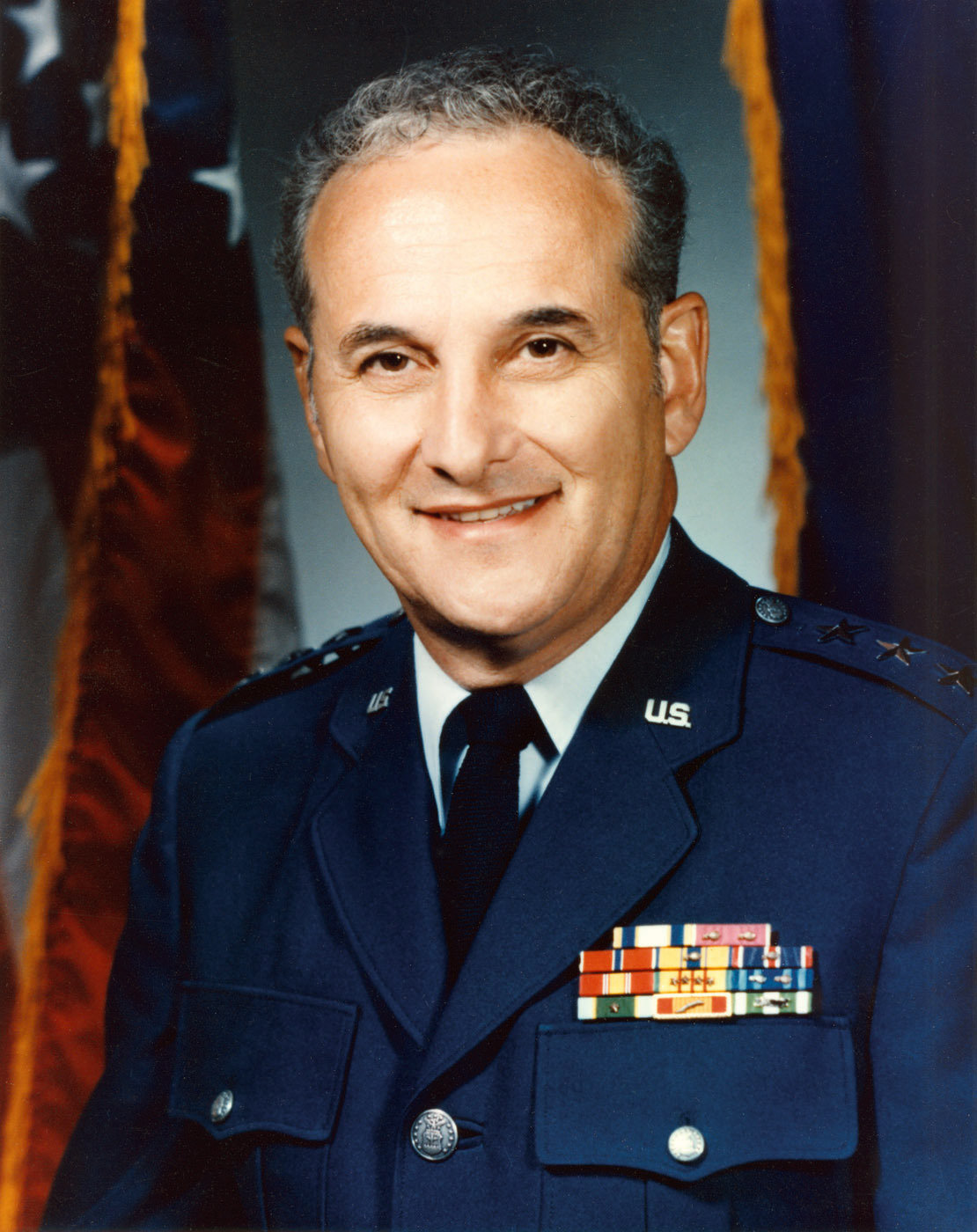
- Lieutenant General Leonard H. Perroots
- Born: Leonard Harry Perroots; April 24, 1933; Morgantown, West Virginia, U.S.
- Died: January 29, 2017 (aged 83); Lake Ridge, Virginia, U.S.
- Military career
- Allegiance: United States of America
- Branch: United States Air Force
- Service years: 1955–1989
- Rank: Lieutenant General
- Nickname: Lenny
- Commands: Director, Defense Intelligence Agency

Leonard Harry Perroots, Sr., USAF (April 24, 1933 – January 29, 2017) was Director of the Defense Intelligence Agency from October 1985 to December 1988. He retired January 1, 1989. In 1989, he was hired by Donald Mayes to become president of Vector Microwave Research Corporation, an enterprise performing tasks and dealings for the CIA and the U.S. military. While serving as assistant chief of staff for the U.S. Air Forces in Europe, he is credited with helping to avert a nuclear war with the Soviet Union during the Able Archer 83 war scare. Perroots died on January 29, 2017, at the age of 83 following a short illness.

== Awards ==
- Air Force Distinguished Service Medal
- Legion of Merit with 2 Bronze Oak Leaf Clusters
