= Exercise Able Archer =

Annual NATO exercise

Exercise Able Archer was an annual exercise by NATO military forces in Europe that practiced command and control procedures, with emphasis on transition from conventional operations to chemical, nuclear, and conventional operations during a time of war. When it was active, it was seen as the culmination of Exercise Autumn Forge. The exercise is best known for Able Archer 83, which began on November 7, 1983 and is believed to have nearly started a nuclear war with the Soviet Union as the Soviets perceived the exercise as a ruse of war.

The exercises themselves simulated a period of conflict escalation, culminating in a simulated DEFCON 1 coordinated nuclear attack.
