= Nadine Akkerman =

Dutch historian and literary scholar

Professor Nadine Akkerman FRHistS MAE
- Born: 1978 (age 47–48)
- Occupations: Historian and academic
- Title: Professor of Early Modern Literature and Culture

Academic background
- Education: Vrije Universiteit Amsterdam

Academic work
- Discipline: History
- Sub-discipline: Early modern period; Political history; History of espionage
- Institutions: Queen Mary University of London; Leiden University; All Souls College, Oxford; Jesus College, Oxford; University of Birmingham

Nadine Akkerman FRHistS MAE (born 1978) is a Dutch historian and Professor of Early Modern Literature and Culture at Leiden University in the Netherlands. Her published work has been concerned with the life and letters of Elizabeth Stuart, Queen of Bohemia, and early modern espionage, and she has made a major contribution to studies of that Queen, the Thirty Years War, and the Wars of the Three Kingdoms, by revisiting and editing original manuscript sources and letters.

== Career ==
Akkerman studied English Language and Literature at the Vrije Universiteit Amsterdam, graduating in 2001. Her 2008 PhD included a survey of the letters of Elizabeth Stuart, Queen of Bohemia. She has been a visiting fellow at All Souls College, Oxford, the Centre for Editing Lives and Letters at Queen Mary University of London, Jesus College, Oxford and the University of Birmingham.

On 11 August 2016, Akkerman and Daniel Smith staged a production of The Masque of Queens at New College, Oxford.

== Selected publications ==
- Spycraft: Tricks and Tools of the Dangerous Trade from Elizabeth I to the Restoration (Yale University Press, 2024), with Pete Langman.
- Elizabeth Stuart, Queen of Hearts (Oxford: Oxford University Press, 2021).
- 'Unlocking History through Automated Virtual Unfolding of Sealed Documents Imaged by X-ray Microtomography', Nature Communications, 12:1184 (2021), with Jana Dambrogio, Amanda Ghassaei et al.
- Invisible Agents: Women and Espionage in Seventeenth-Century Britain (Oxford: Oxford University Press, 2018).
- Courtly Rivals in the Hague: Elizabeth of Bohemia and Amalia van Solms (Venlo: VanSpijk/Rekafa, 2015).
- 'The Goddess of the Household: The Masquing Politics of Lucy Harington-Russell, Countess of Bedford', in Nadine Akkerman & Birgit Houben (eds), The Politics of Female Households: Ladies-in-waiting across Early Modern Europe (Leiden: Brill, 2014).
- The Correspondence of Elizabeth Stuart, Queen of Bohemia, 3 volumes (Oxford: Oxford University Press, 2011-2016)
