= FleetEx '83-1 =

1983 US Navy exercise in northern Pacific

- Part of the Cold War (1979–1985)
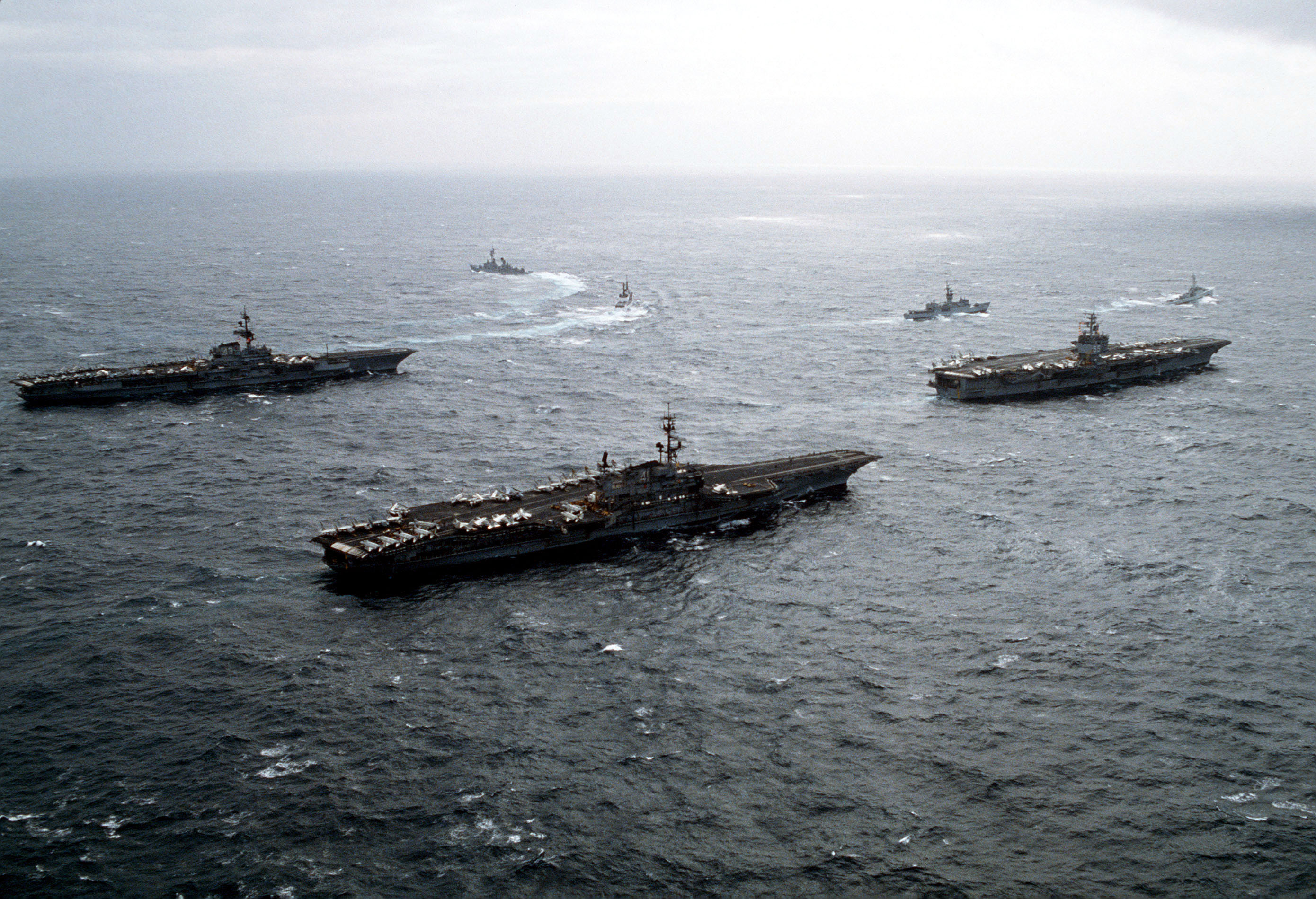
- Aircraft carriers Midway, Coral Sea, Enterprise
- Type: Combined naval exercise
- Location: Northern Pacific Ocean
- Planned by: United States Navy
- Date: 29 March 1983 to 17 April 1983

FleetEx 83 was a naval exercise that took place between March 29 and April 17 of 1983 in the northern Pacific Ocean near the Aleutian Islands. Three carrier battle groups participated in the exercise, consisting of the carriers Enterprise, Midway, and Coral Sea and their respective escort ships. According to Admiral Robert L. J. Long, Commander-in-Chief of U.S. Forces in the Pacific, FleetEx 83 comprised “the largest fleet exercise conducted by the Pacific Fleet since World War II.” The combined task force consisted of approximately forty ships, 23,000 crew members, and 300 aircraft.

The exercise lasted approximately two weeks and was conducted in the Northern Pacific, within flight range of the Soviet Union coast. The purpose of the mission was to intentionally provoke the Soviet Union into responding so that the US forces could study their response, tactics, and capabilities as well as demonstrate the effective operations of a three-carrier battle force in joint and combined operations across multiple service branches in both the United States and Canada, in a high-threat environment. The exercises were extremely successful and effective in integrating the combined forces of the United States Navy, Coast Guard, Air Force, Canadian Maritime Command and Australian naval forces into an effective battleworthy whole. Despite poor weather, the fleet excelled throughout the exercise.
