= Silo 14 =

Board game

Silo 14 is a 1983 board game published by Jersey Devil/Centurion Games.

== Gameplay ==
Silo 14 is a game about a doomsday scenario intended for either solitaire play or multiple players, in which the Commandos must stop an out of control general from starting World War III.

== Reception ==
Suzanne Stevens reviewed Silo 14 in Space Gamer No. 67. Stevens commented that "When you manage to beat the odds, Silo 14 has its exciting and gratifying moments, but the game is not for the impatient or the easily discouraged. For those ready for a challenge, however, Silo 14 makes for an amusing hour of game playing."
