= Spycraft (book) =

2024 non-fiction book

Spycraft: Tricks and Tools of the Dangerous Trade from Elizabeth I to the Restoration
- Author: Nadine Akkerman, Pete Langman
- Publisher: Yale University Press
- Publication date: 25 June 2024
- Pages: 368
- ISBN: 9780300267549

Spycraft: Tricks and Tools of the Dangerous Trade from Elizabeth I to the Restoration is a 2024 non fiction book by Nadine Akkerman and Pete Langman, published by Yale University Press.

Spycraft was praised by Jonathan Bate in The Daily Telegraph as "an intriguing study ... of the mechanics of Elizabethan and Jacobean espionage" which is "anything but stodgy and over-long". In the Literary Review Peter Davidson wrote that "Spycraft is an excellent book, accessibly written, profoundly researched, cleverly illustrated and immensely readable." while for Harper's Magazine Dan Piepenbring commended it as "a diverting history and how-to manual". Writing in the New Statesman Pippa Bailey concludes that "Most enjoyable of all is the epilogue of instructions for invisible inks, codes and poisons". For The Spectator Iona Mclaren described Spycraft as "A companion piece to Akkerman’s acclaimed 2019 Invisible Agents", adding that "it wears the weight of its impeccable learning even more lightly, as it canters through forgeries, codes, disguises, invisible inks and poisons". In her review in History Today Jackie Eales concludes that "Spycraft is not only a textual tour de force, but contains a wealth of explanatory images of the authors' recreations of locked letters and forged signature stamps". Diarmaid MacCulloch, writing in The Times Literary Supplement, described Spycraft as "a classic and incisive monograph, based on all the right primary sources, that also manages to be absorbing, illuminating and entertaining". Lucy Wooding wrote in the London Review of Books that "Akkerman and Langman make the case for the importance of studying material culture", adding that "The book as a whole is imbued with a faint but detectable sense of professional pride". It was selected by The Economist as one of the best books published in 2024.
