= Able Archer 83 =

NATO command post exercise in 1983

- Part of the Cold War (1979–1985) and nuclear close calls
Date	November 7–11, 1983 (4 days)
Location	Washington D.C., United States and London, United Kingdom
Result	Exercise ends on November 11 without incident; Soviet nuclear forces stand down

Belligerents
NATO; United States; United Kingdom; France; West Germany; Norway	Warsaw Pact; Soviet Union; East Germany; Poland; Czechoslovakia

Commanders and leaders
(United States) Ronald Reagan (United States) Leonard H. Perroots (United States) Billy M. Minter (United Kingdom) Margaret Thatcher (West Germany) Helmut Kohl	(Soviet Union) Yuri Andropov (Soviet Union) Sergei Akhromeyev (Soviet Union) Nikolai Ogarkov

Able Archer 83 was a military exercise conducted by NATO that took place in November 1983, as part of the annual Able Archer exercise. It simulated a period of heightened nuclear tensions between NATO and the Warsaw Pact, leading to concerns that it could have been mistaken for a real attack by the Soviet Union. The exercise is considered by some to be one of the closest moments the world came to nuclear war during the Cold War. The purpose of the exercise, like previous years, was to simulate a period of conflict escalation, culminating in the U.S. military attaining a simulated DEFCON 1 coordinated nuclear attack. The five-day exercise, which involved NATO commands throughout Western Europe, was coordinated from the Supreme Headquarters Allied Powers Europe (SHAPE) headquarters in Casteau, Belgium.

The 1983 exercise, which began on November 7, introduced several new elements not seen in previous years, including a new, unique format of coded communication, radio silences, and the participation of heads of government. This increase in realism, combined with tense relations between the United States and the Soviet Union and the anticipated arrival of Pershing II nuclear missiles in Europe, led some members of the Soviet Politburo and military to believe that Able Archer 83 was a ruse of war, obscuring preparations for a genuine nuclear first strike. In response, the Soviet Union readied their nuclear forces and placed air units in East Germany and Poland on alert. The Soviet 4th Air Army began loading nuclear warheads onto combat planes in preparation for war. The apparent threat of nuclear war ended when U.S. lieutenant general Leonard H. Perroots advised against responding to the Warsaw Pact military activity, which ended with the conclusion of the exercise on November 11.

The exercise attracted public attention in 2015 when the President's Intelligence Advisory Board's 1990 report on the exercise was declassified. Some scholars have argued that Able Archer 83 was one of the times when the world has come closest to nuclear war since the Cuban Missile Crisis in 1962. The declassification of related documents in 2021 supported this notion. Other scholars have disputed this.

== Prelude to NATO exercise ==
=== Operation RYAN ===
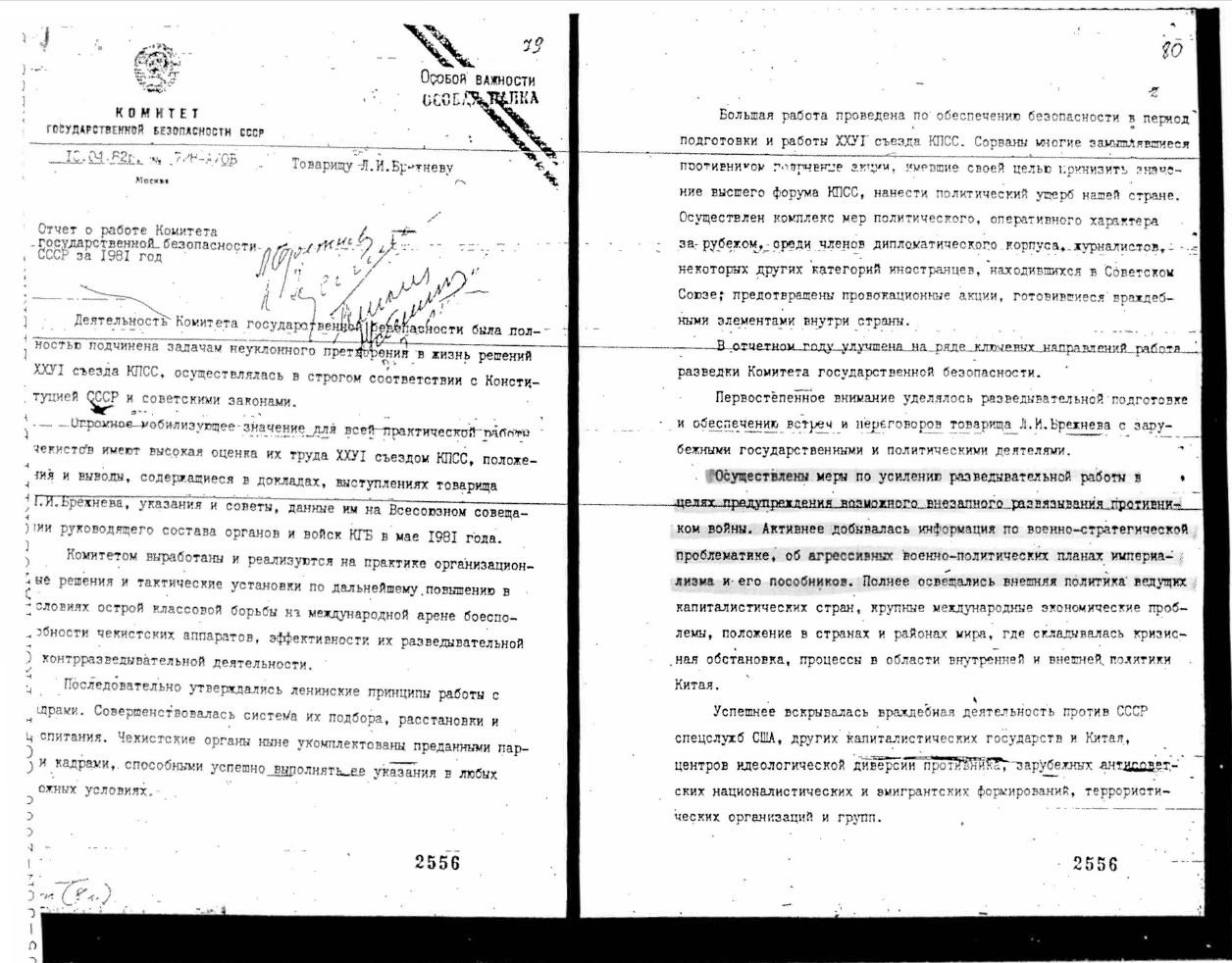
A KGB report from 1981 reporting that the KGB had "implemented measures to strengthen intelligence work in order to prevent a possible sudden outbreak of war by the enemy". To do this, the KGB "actively obtained information on military and strategic issues, and the aggressive military and political plans of imperialism [the United States] and its accomplices", and "enhanced the relevance and effectiveness of its active intelligence abilities".

The greatest catalyst to the Able Archer war scare occurred more than two years earlier. In a May 1981 closed-session meeting of senior KGB officers and Soviet leaders, General Secretary Leonid Brezhnev and KGB chairman Yuri Andropov bluntly announced that the United States was preparing a secret nuclear attack on the USSR.

To combat this threat, Andropov announced, the KGB and GRU military foreign intelligence arm would begin Operation RYaN. RYaN (Russian: РЯН) was a Russian acronym for 'nuclear missile attack' (Ракетно Ядерное Нападение, Raketno Yadernoe Napadenie); Operation RYaN was the largest, most comprehensive peacetime intelligence-gathering operation in Soviet history. Agents abroad were charged with monitoring the figures who would decide to launch a nuclear attack, the service and technical personnel who would implement the attack, and the facilities from which the attack would originate. It is possible that the goal of Operation RYaN was to discover the first intent of a nuclear attack and then preempt it.

The exact impetus for the implementation of Operation RYaN is not known for sure. Oleg Gordievsky, the highest-ranking KGB official ever to defect, attributed it to "a potentially lethal combination of Reaganite rhetoric and Soviet paranoia". Gordievsky conjectured that Brezhnev and Andropov, who "were very, very old-fashioned and easily influenced ... by Communist dogmas", truly believed that an antagonistic Ronald Reagan would push the nuclear button and relegate the Soviet Union to the literal "ash heap of history". Central Intelligence Agency historian Benjamin B. Fischer lists several concrete occurrences that likely led to the birth of RYaN. The first of these was the use of psychological operations (PSYOP) that began soon after Reagan took office.

In his report, Fischer also writes that another CIA source was, at least partially, corroborating Gordievsky's reporting. This Czechoslovak intelligence officer—who worked closely with the KGB on RYaN—"noted that his counterparts were obsessed with the historical parallel between 1941 and 1983. He believed this feeling was almost visceral, not intellectual, and deeply affected Soviet thinking."

=== Psychological operations ===
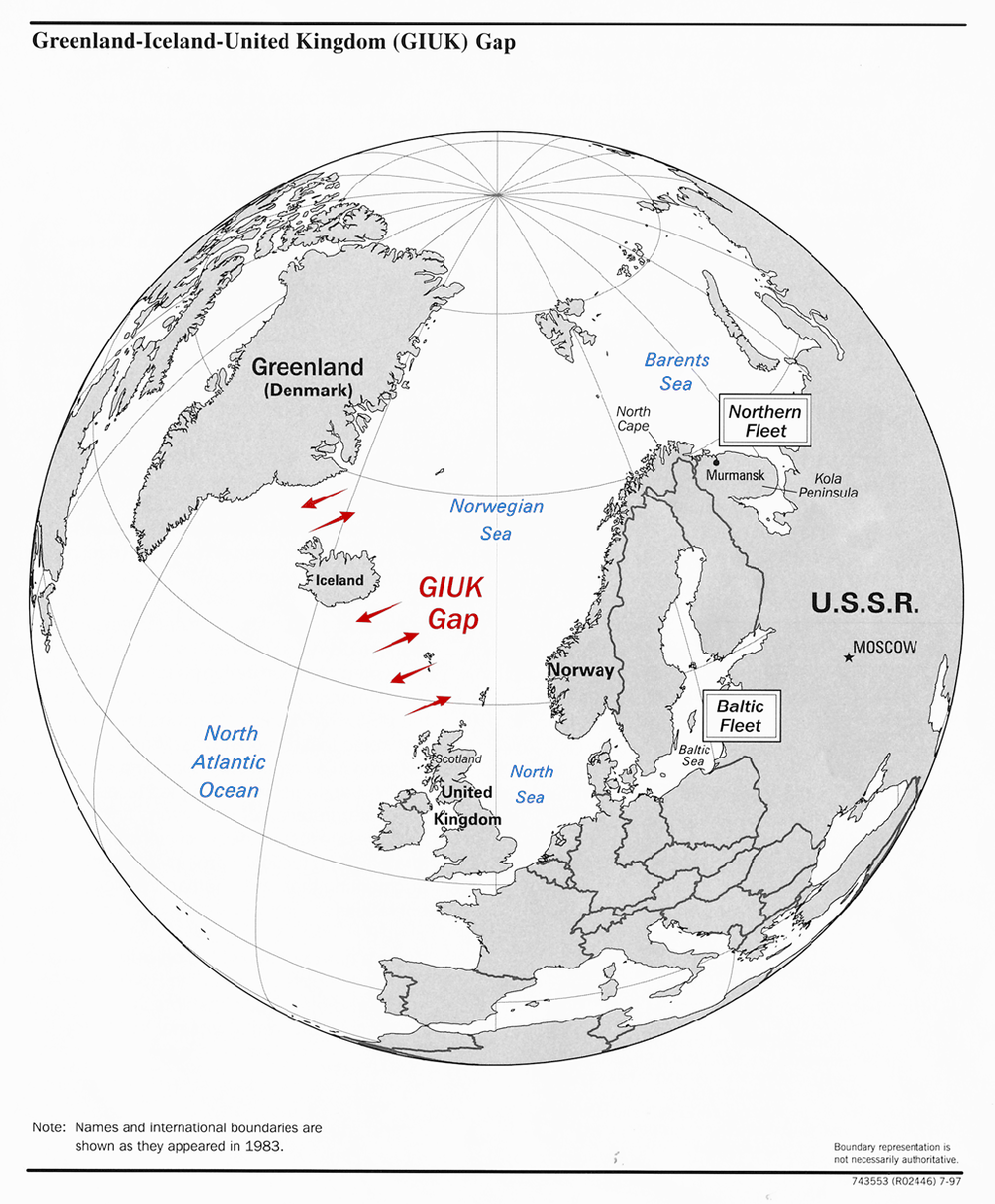
The Greenland–Iceland–United Kingdom (GIUK) gap in the North Atlantic.

Psychological operations by the United States began in mid-February 1981 and continued intermittently until 1983. These included a series of clandestine naval operations that stealthily accessed Soviet territorial waters in the far north and far east, demonstrating how close NATO ships could get to critical Soviet military bases. In 1981, a group of 83 American, British, Canadian, and Norwegian ships led by USS Dwight D. Eisenhower sailed through the Greenland–Iceland–United Kingdom (GIUK) gap undetected by Soviet radar and spy satellites, reaching the Kola Peninsula. There were other operations routinely occurring in the Barents, Norwegian, Black, and Baltic seas. US intelligence ships were regularly posted off the coast of the Crimean Peninsula. American bombers also flew directly towards Soviet airspace, peeling off at the last moment, sometimes several times per week. These near-penetrations were designed to test Soviet radar vulnerability as well as demonstrate US capabilities in a nuclear war.

"It really got to them," said Dr. William Schneider, [former] undersecretary of state for military assistance and technology, who saw classified "after-action reports" that indicated U.S. flight activity. "They didn't know what it all meant. A squadron would fly straight at Soviet airspace, and other radars would light up and units would go on alert. Then at the last minute the squadron would peel off and return home."

=== FleetEx '83 ===
In April 1983, the U.S. Pacific Fleet conducted FleetEx '83-1, the largest fleet exercise held to date in the North Pacific. The conglomeration of approximately 40 ships with 23,000 crewmembers and 300 aircraft was arguably one of the most powerful naval armadas ever assembled. US aircraft and ships moved counterclockwise from the Aleutian Islands towards the Kamchatka Peninsula to provoke the Soviets into reacting, allowing the US Office of Naval Intelligence to study Soviet radar characteristics, aircraft capabilities, and tactical maneuvers. The armada conducted operations in areas patrolled by Soviet SSBN's stationed in the strategic Soviet Navy base in Petropavlovsk. On April 4 at least six U.S. Navy F-14 Tomcat fighters from USS Enterprise and USS Midway flew over a Soviet military base in Zeleny Island, one of the Kuril Islands, in a simulated bombing raid. In retaliation the Soviets ordered an overflight of the Aleutian Islands. The Soviet Union also issued a formal diplomatic démarche of protest, which accused the United States of repeated penetrations of Soviet airspace. In a testimony to the Senate Armed Services Committee, Chief of Naval Operations James D. Watkins said that the Soviet Union was "as naked as a jaybird [on the Kamchatka Peninsula], and they know it".

=== Korean Air Lines Flight 007 ===
On September 1, 1983, Korean Air Lines Flight 007 (KAL 007) was shot down by a Soviet Su-15 interceptor over the Sea of Japan near Moneron Island (just west of Sakhalin island) while flying over prohibited Soviet airspace. All 269 passengers and crew aboard were killed, including Larry McDonald, a sitting member of the United States House of Representatives from Georgia and president of the anti-communist John Birch Society.

=== Weapons buildup ===
From the start, the Reagan administration adopted a bellicose stance toward the Soviet Union, one that favored seriously constraining Soviet strategic and global military capabilities. The administration's focus on this objective resulted in the largest peacetime military buildup in the history of the United States. It also ushered in the final major escalation in rhetoric of the Cold War. On June 8, 1982, Reagan, in a speech to the British House of Commons, declared that "Freedom and democracy will leave Marxism and Leninism on the ash heap of history."

On March 23, 1983, Reagan announced one of the most ambitious and controversial components to this strategy — the Strategic Defense Initiative (labeled "Star Wars" by the media and critics). While Reagan portrayed the initiative as a safety net against nuclear war, leaders in the Soviet Union viewed it as a definitive departure from the relative weapons parity of détente and an escalation of the arms race into space. Yuri Andropov, who had become General Secretary following Brezhnev's death in November 1982, criticised Reagan for "inventing new plans on how to unleash a nuclear war in the best way, with the hope of winning it".

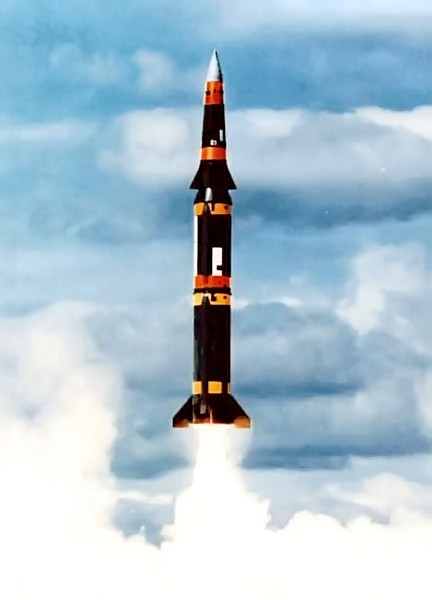
The US Pershing II missile

Despite the Soviet outcry over the Strategic Defense Initiative, the weapons plan that generated the most alarm among the Soviet Union's leadership during Able Archer 83 was NATO's planned deployment of intermediate-range Pershing II missiles in Western Europe. (Note: Although Able Archer 83 simulated the release of Pershing II missiles for the first time, the missiles themselves were not deployed until November 23, twelve days after the exercise completed.) These missiles, deployed to counter Soviet RSD-10 Pioneer intermediate-range missiles on the USSR's western border, represented a major threat to the Soviets. The Pershing II was capable of destroying Soviet "hard targets" such as underground missile silos and command and control bunkers.

The missiles could be emplaced in and launched from any surveyed site in minutes, and because the guidance system was self-correcting, the missile system possessed a genuine first strike capability. Furthermore, it was estimated that the missiles (deployed in West Germany) could reach targets in the western Soviet Union within four to six minutes of their launch. These capabilities led Soviet leaders to believe that the only way to survive a Pershing II strike was to preempt it. This fear of an undetected Pershing II attack, according to CIA historian Benjamin B. Fischer, was explicitly linked to the mandate of Operation RYaN: to detect a decision by the United States to launch a nuclear attack and to preempt it.

=== False alarm from the Soviet missile early warning system ===
On the night of September 26, 1983, the Soviet orbital missile early warning system (SPRN), code-named Oko, reported an intercontinental ballistic missile launch from the territory of the United States. Lieutenant Colonel Stanislav Petrov, who was on duty during the incident, dismissed the warning as a computer error when ground early warning radars did not detect any launches. Part of his reasoning was that the system was new and known to have malfunctioned previously; also, a full-scale nuclear attack from the United States would involve thousands of simultaneous launches, not a single missile.

Later, the system reported four more ICBM launches headed to the Soviet Union, but Petrov again dismissed the reports as false. The investigation that followed revealed that the system indeed malfunctioned and the false alarms were caused by a rare alignment of sunlight on high-altitude clouds underneath the satellites' orbits.

== Exercise Able Archer 83 ==
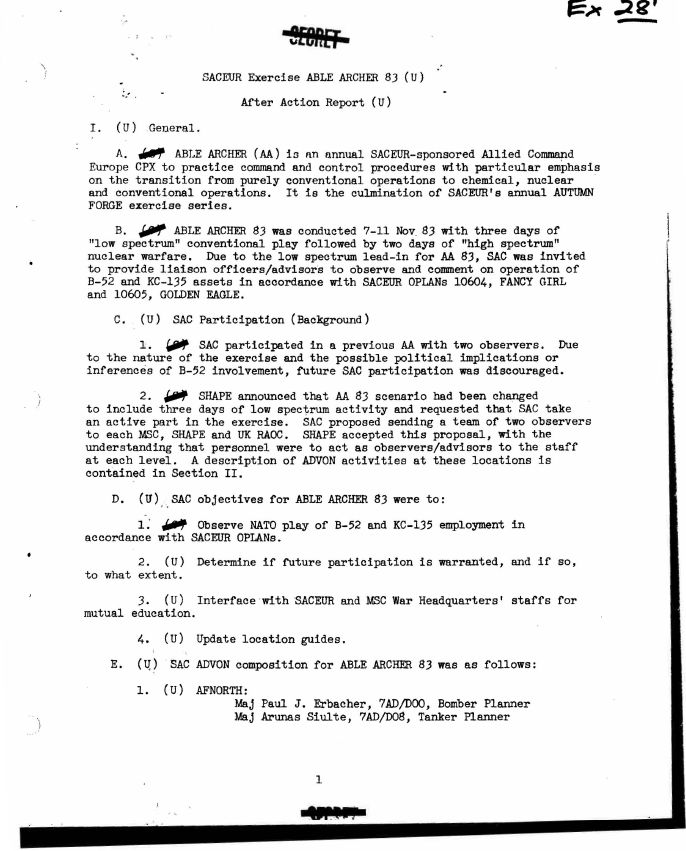
A US Air Force after-action report describes three days of "low spectrum" conventional play followed by two days of "high spectrum nuclear warfare". From the National Security Archive.

A scenario released by NATO details the hypothetical lead-up to the Able Archer exercise, which was used by the U.S. Joint Chiefs of Staff in Washington, D.C., and the British Ministry of Defence in London. The war game was intended to be "Blue" forces representing NATO and "Orange" forces representing the Warsaw Pact. The scenario envisioned proxy conflicts in Syria, South Yemen, and Iran escalating after Yugoslavia shifted to the Blue bloc with Orange forces invading Finland, Norway, and West Germany. Dr. Gregory Pedlow, a SHAPE historian, explains the war game:

The exercise scenario began with Orange (the hypothetical opponent) opening hostilities in all regions of ACE [Allied Command Europe] on 4 November (three days before the start of the exercise) and Blue (NATO) declaring a general alert. Orange initiated the use of chemical weapons on 6 November and by the end of that day had used such weapons throughout ACE. All of these events had taken place prior to the start of the exercise and were simply part of the written scenario. There had thus been three days of fighting and a deteriorating situation prior to the start of the exercise. This was desired because—as previously stated—the purpose of the exercise was to test procedures for transitioning from conventional to nuclear operations. As a result of Orange advance, its persistent use of chemical weapons, and its clear intentions to rapidly commit second echelon forces, SACEUR requested political guidance on the use of nuclear weapons early on Day 1 of the exercise (7 November 1983).

Thus, on November 7, 1983, as Soviet intelligence services were attempting to detect the early signs of a nuclear attack, NATO began to simulate one. The exercise, codenamed Able Archer, involved numerous NATO allies and simulated NATO's Command, Control, and Communications (C^{3}) procedures during a nuclear war. Some Soviet leaders, because of the preceding world events and the exercise's particularly realistic nature, feared that the exercise was a cover for an actual attack. A KGB telegram of February 17 described one likely scenario:

In view of the fact that the measures involved in State Orange [a nuclear attack within 36 hours] have to be carried out with the utmost secrecy (under the guise of maneuvers, training etc.) in the shortest possible time, without disclosing the content of operational plans, it is highly probable that the battle alarm system may be used to prepare a surprise RYaN [nuclear attack] in peacetime.

Also on February 17, KGB Permanent Operational Assignment assigned its agents to monitor several possible indicators of a nuclear attack. These included actions by "A cadre of people associated with preparing and implementing decisions about RYaN, and also a group of people, including service and technical personnel ... those working in the operating services of installations connected with processing and implementing the decision about RYaN, and communication staff involved in the operation and interaction of these installations."

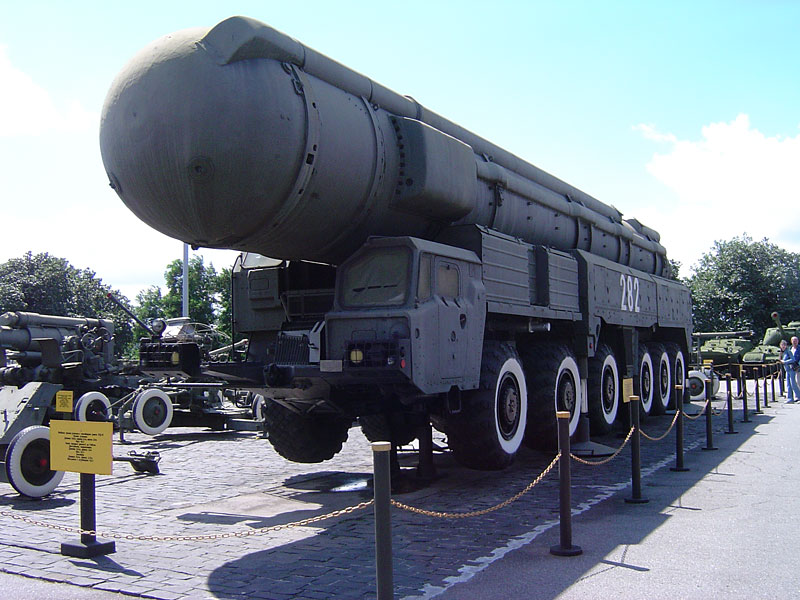
A Soviet RSD-10 missile

Because Able Archer 83 simulated an actual release of nuclear weapons, it is likely that the service and technical personnel mentioned in the memo were active in the exercise. More conspicuously, British Prime Minister Margaret Thatcher and West German Chancellor Helmut Kohl participated (though not concurrently) in the nuclear drill. United States President Reagan, Vice President George H. W. Bush, and Secretary of Defense Caspar Weinberger also intended to participate. Robert McFarlane, who had assumed the position of National Security Advisor just two weeks earlier, realized the implications of such participation early in the exercise's planning and rejected it.

Another illusory indicator likely noticed by Soviet analysts was a high rate of ciphered communications between the United Kingdom and the United States. Soviet intelligence was informed that "so-called nuclear consultations in NATO are probably one of the stages of immediate preparation by the adversary for RYaN". To the Soviet analysts, this burst of secret communications between the US and the UK one month before the beginning of Able Archer may have appeared to be this "consultation". In reality, the burst of communication was about the US invasion of Grenada on October 25, 1983, which caused a great deal of diplomatic traffic as the sovereign of the island was Elizabeth II.

A further startling aspect reported by KGB agents concerned the NATO communications used during the exercise. According to Moscow Centre's February 17 memo,

It [is] of the highest importance to keep a watch on the functioning of communications networks and systems since through them information is passed about the adversary's intentions and, above all, about his plans to use nuclear weapons and practical implementation of these. In addition, changes in the method of operating communications systems and the level of manning may in themselves indicate the state of preparation for RYaN.

Soviet intelligence appeared to substantiate these suspicions by reporting that NATO was indeed using unique, never-before-seen procedures as well as message formats more sophisticated than previous exercises, which possibly indicated the proximity of nuclear attack.

Finally, during Able Archer 83, NATO forces simulated a move through all alert phases, from DEFCON 5 to DEFCON 1. While these phases were simulated, alarmist KGB agents mistakenly reported them as real. According to Soviet intelligence, NATO doctrine stated, "Operational readiness No. 1 is declared when there are obvious indications of preparation to begin military operations. It is considered that war is inevitable and may start at any moment."

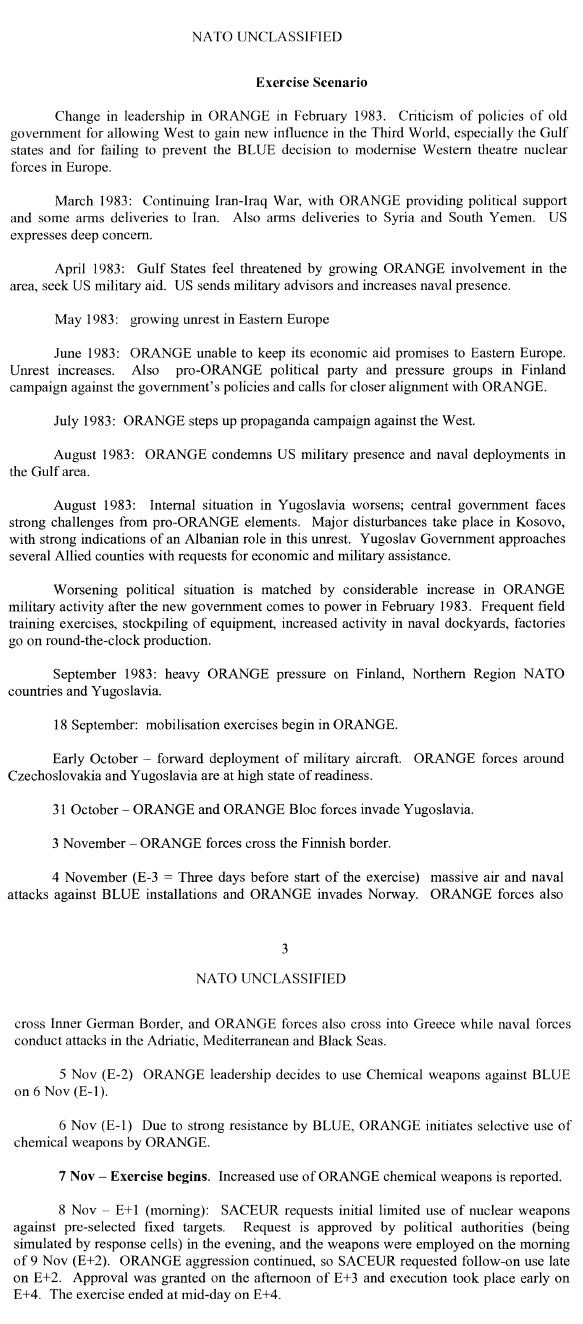
The unclassified NATO summary of Able Archer 83, provided by SHAPE chief historian Gregory Pedlow, provides a narrative of how the Cold War could have turned nuclear. Image provided by the National Security Archive.

According to a 2013 analysis by the National Security Archive:

The Able Archer controversy has featured numerous descriptions of the exercise as so "routine" that it could not have alarmed the Soviet military and political leadership. Today's posting reveals multiple non-routine elements, including: a 170-flight, radio-silent air lift of 19,000 US soldiers to Europe, the shifting of commands from "Permanent War Headquarters to the Alternate War Headquarters," the practice of "new nuclear weapons release procedures", including consultations with cells in Washington and London, and the "sensitive, political issue" of numerous "slips of the tongue" in which B-52 sorties were referred to as nuclear "strikes". These variations, seen through "the fog of nuclear exercises", did in fact match official Soviet intelligence-defined indicators for "possible operations by the US and its allies on British territory in preparation for RYaN"—the KGB code name for a feared Western nuclear missile attack.

Upon learning that US nuclear activity mirrored its hypothesized first strike activity, Moscow Centre sent its residencies a flash telegram on November 8 or 9 (Oleg Gordievsky cannot recall which), incorrectly reporting an alert on American bases and frantically asking for further information regarding an American first strike. The alert precisely coincided with the seven- to ten-day period estimated between NATO's preliminary decision and an actual strike.

The Soviet Union, believing its only chance of surviving a NATO strike was to preempt it, readied its nuclear arsenal. The CIA reported activity in the Baltic Military District and in Czechoslovakia, and it determined that nuclear-capable aircraft in Poland and East Germany were placed "on high alert status with readying of nuclear strike forces". A 1989 US memorandum said that Soviet commanders ordered nuclear warheads to be placed on 4th Air Army bombers and for the Group of Soviet Forces in Germany fighter-bombers to be placed on a 30-minute alert. Former CIA analyst Peter Vincent Pry goes further, saying he suspects that the aircraft were merely the tip of the iceberg. He hypothesizes that in accordance with Soviet military procedure and history, ICBM silos, easily readied and difficult for the United States to detect the readiness status of, were also prepared for a launch.

Lt. Gen. Leonard H. Perroots, the assistant chief of staff of the U.S. Air Force in Europe, is credited with the decision not to place NATO forces on increased alert despite increased Soviet readiness. He informed his superior, General Billy M. Minter, of "unusual activity" in the Eastern Bloc but suggested that they wait until the end of the exercise to see if the behavior was caused by it, thereby reducing the possibility of a nuclear exchange.

Soviet fears of the attack ended as the Able Archer exercise finished on November 11. Upon learning of the Soviet reaction to Able Archer 83 by way of the double agent Oleg Gordievsky, a British SIS asset, President Reagan commented, "I don't see how they could believe that—but it's something to think about."

== Soviet reaction ==
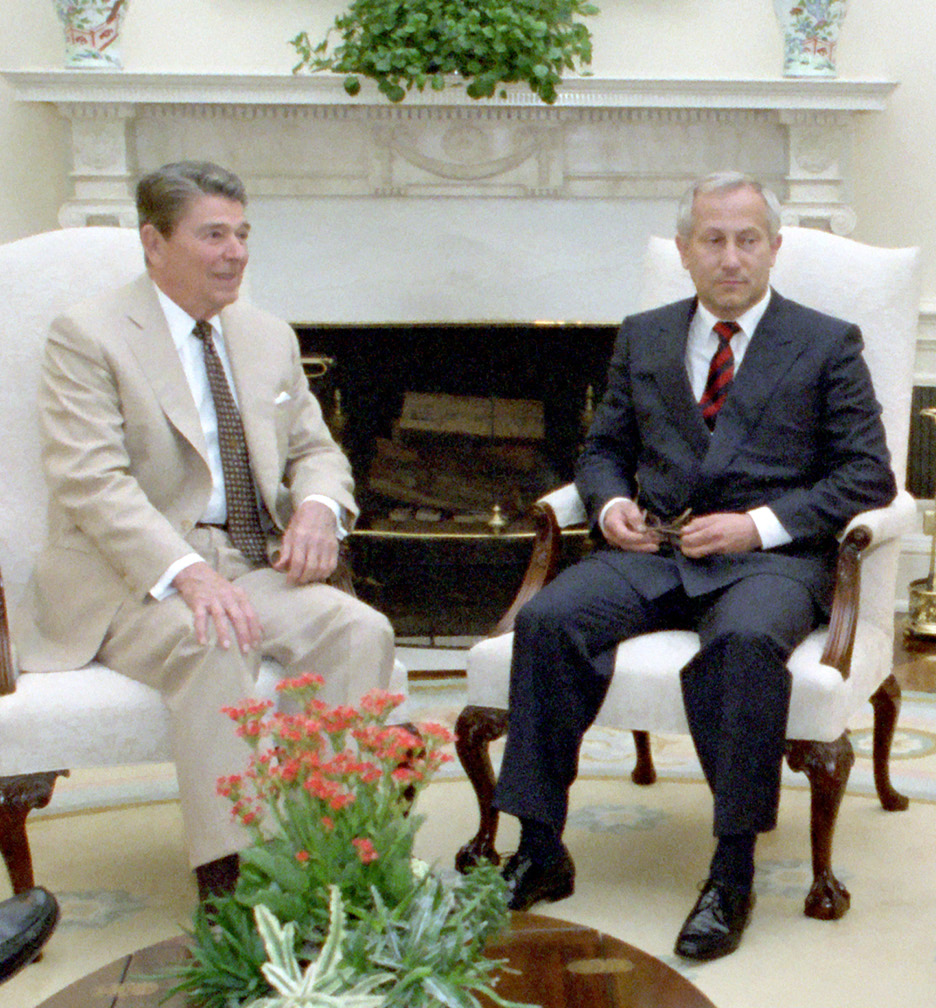
President Ronald Reagan and Soviet double agent Oleg Gordievsky.

The double agent Oleg Gordievsky, whose highest rank was KGB rezident in London, is the only Soviet source ever to have published an account of Able Archer 83. Oleg Kalugin and Yuri Shvets, who were KGB officers in 1983, have published accounts that acknowledge Operation RYaN, but they do not mention Able Archer 83. Gordievsky and other Warsaw Pact intelligence agents were extremely skeptical about a NATO first strike, perhaps because of their proximity to, and understanding of, the West. Nevertheless, agents were ordered to report their observations, not their analysis, and this critical flaw in the Soviet intelligence system—coined by Gordievsky as the "intelligence cycle"—fed the fear of US nuclear aggression.

Marshal Sergei Akhromeyev, who at the time was chief of the main operations directorate of the Soviet General Staff, told Cold War historian Don Orbendorfer that he had never heard of Able Archer. The lack of public Soviet response over Able Archer 83 has led some historians, including Fritz W. Ermarth in his piece, "Observations on the 'War Scare' of 1983 From an Intelligence Perch", to conclude that the Soviet Union did not see Able Archer 83 as posing an immediate threat to the Soviet Union.

== American reaction ==
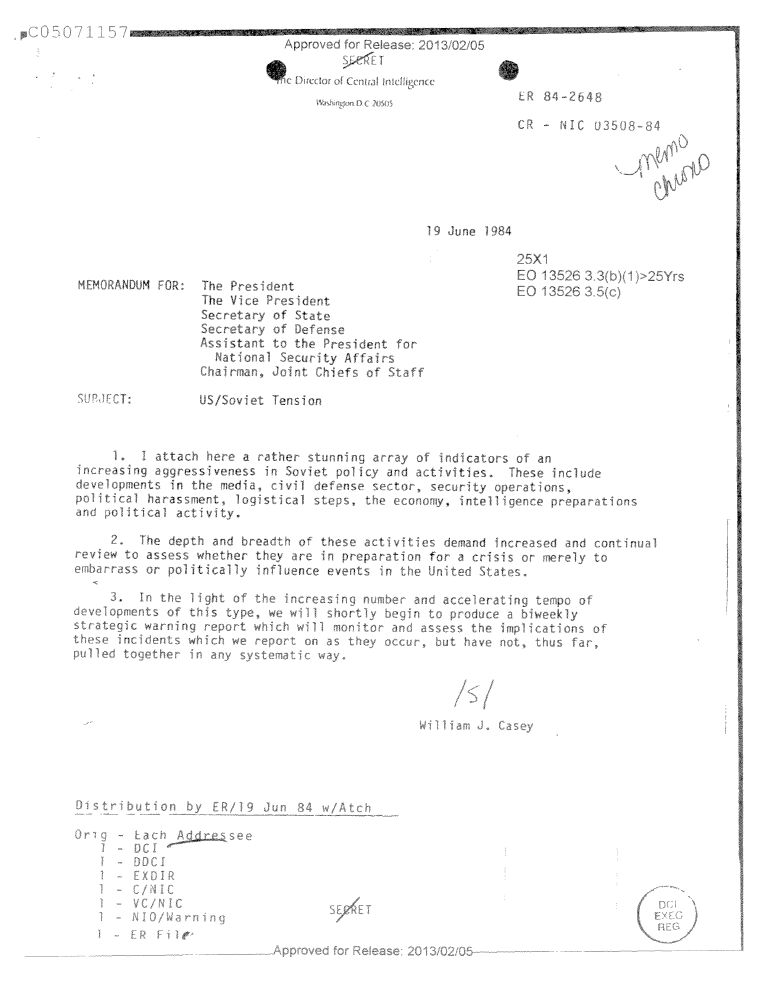
A memorandum from Director of the Central Intelligence Agency William Casey to President Reagan and other Cabinet-level officials after Able Archer 83 warning of a "rather stunning array of indicators" showing that "The [Soviet] military behaviors we have observed involve high military costs ... adding thereby a dimension of genuineness to the Soviet expressions of concern that is often not reflected in intelligence issuances." From the National Security Archive.

In May 1984, CIA Soviet specialist Ethan J. Done drafted "Implications of Recent Soviet Military-Political Activities", which concluded: "we believe strongly that Soviet actions are not inspired by, and Soviet leaders do not perceive, a genuine danger of imminent conflict with the United States." Robert Gates, deputy director for Intelligence during Able Archer 83, has published thoughts on the exercise that dispute this conclusion:

Information about the peculiar and remarkably skewed frame of mind of the Soviet leaders during those times that has emerged since the collapse of the Soviet Union makes me think there is a good chance—with all of the other events in 1983—that they really felt a NATO attack was at least possible and that they took a number of measures to enhance their military readiness short of mobilization. After going through the experience at the time, then through the postmortems, and now through the documents, I don't think the Soviets were crying wolf. They may not have believed a NATO attack was imminent in November 1983, but they did seem to believe that the situation was very dangerous. And US intelligence [SNIE 11–9–84 and SNIE 11–10–84] had failed to grasp the true extent of their anxiety.

A report written by Nina Stewart for the President's Foreign Advisory Board concurs with Gates and disputes the previous CIA reports, concluding that further analysis shows that the Soviets were, in fact, genuinely fearful of US aggression. The decision of Gen. Perroots was described as "fortuitous", noting "[he] acted correctly out of instinct, not informed guidance", suggesting that had the depth of Soviet fear been fully realized, NATO may have responded differently.

Some historians, including Beth A. Fischer in her book The Reagan Reversal, pin Able Archer 83 as profoundly affecting President Reagan and his turn from a policy of confrontation towards the Soviet Union to a policy of rapprochement. The thoughts of Reagan and those around him provide important insight upon the nuclear scare and its subsequent ripples. On October 10, 1983, just over a month before Able Archer 83, President Reagan viewed a television film about Lawrence, Kansas, being destroyed by a nuclear attack titled The Day After. In his diary, the president wrote that the film "left me greatly depressed".

Later in October, Reagan attended a Pentagon briefing on nuclear war. During his first two years in office, he had refused to take part in such briefings, feeling it irrelevant to rehearse a nuclear apocalypse; finally, he consented to the Pentagon official requests. According to officials present, the briefing "chastened" Reagan. Weinberger said, "[Reagan] had a very deep revulsion to the whole idea of nuclear weapons ... These war games brought home to anybody the fantastically horrible events that would surround such a scenario." Reagan described the briefing in his own words: "A most sobering experience with [Caspar Weinberger] and Gen. Vessey in the Situation Room, a briefing on our complete plan in the event of a nuclear attack."

These two glimpses of nuclear war primed Reagan for Able Archer 83, giving him a very specific picture of what would occur had the situation further developed. After receiving intelligence reports from sources including Gordievsky, it was clear that the Soviets were unnerved. While officials were concerned with the Soviet panic, they were hesitant about believing the proximity of a Soviet attack. Secretary of State George P. Shultz thought it "incredible, at least to us" that the Soviets would believe the US would launch a genuine attack. In general, Reagan did not share the secretary's belief that cooler heads would prevail, writing:

We had many contingency plans for responding to a nuclear attack. But everything would happen so fast that I wondered how much planning or reason could be applied in such a crisis ... Six minutes to decide how to respond to a blip on a radar scope and decide whether to unleash Armageddon! How could anyone apply reason at a time like that?

According to McFarlane, the president responded with "genuine anxiety" in disbelief that a regular NATO exercise could have led to an armed attack. To the ailing Politburo—led from the deathbed of the terminally ill Andropov, a man with no firsthand knowledge of the United States, and the creator of Operation RYaN—it seemed "that the United States was preparing to launch ... a sudden nuclear attack on the Soviet Union". In his memoirs, Reagan, without specifically mentioning Able Archer 83, wrote of a 1983 realization:

Three years had taught me something surprising about the Russians: Many people at the top of the Soviet hierarchy were genuinely afraid of America and Americans. Perhaps this shouldn't have surprised me, but it did ... During my first years in Washington, I think many of us in the administration took it for granted that the Russians, like ourselves, considered it unthinkable that the United States would launch a first strike against them. But the more experience I had with Soviet leaders and other heads of state who knew them, the more I began to realize that many Soviet officials feared us not only as adversaries but as potential aggressors who might hurl nuclear weapons at them in a first strike ... Well, if that was the case, I was even more anxious to get a top Soviet leader in a room alone and try to convince him we had no designs on the Soviet Union and Russians had nothing to fear from us.

Reagan eventually met Soviet General Secretary Mikhail Gorbachev in Geneva in 1985 and at subsequent summits, leading to the 1987 Intermediate-Range Nuclear Forces Treaty and later treaties.

When retiring from the Defense Intelligence Agency in January 1989, Perroots wrote a memorandum about the crisis to the President's Foreign Intelligence Advisory Board. In 1990, the board released a report commending Perroots for his actions and confirming the hazards of the exercise. After a 12-year legal battle, the National Security Archive succeeded in having the report declassified under the Freedom of Information Act request in 2015. In 2017, the National Security Archive additionally requested the Perroots memorandum from the DIA but the organization claimed that the letter was lost, leading to a 2019 lawsuit. In February 2021 the Historian's Office of the U.S. State Department declassified and released the document as part of its Foreign Relations of the United States collection. The document confirmed for the first time that the Soviet military loaded nuclear warheads onto bombers and indicated that it had gotten closer to nuclear war than previously thought, with Perroots claiming that "a precautionary generation of forces" by NATO could have instigated a nuclear conflict.

== Additional viewpoints ==
In the years since the incident, scholars have debated whether or not this event could have triggered a nuclear war. Research by Simon Miles, an assistant professor of Public Policy and Russian and Eurasian Studies at Duke University's Sanford School, completed in 2020, has disputed that Able Archer 83 nearly led to nuclear war. Other experts, such as Gordon Barras, Raymond Garthoof, Beatrice Heuser, Mark Kramer, and Votjech Mastny, have argued that those present in the USSR at the time were not of the belief that tensions rose to the point that the Soviets prepared for a nuclear attack. Or, that the USSR was, at that time, already anticipating an attack.

A survey conducted by the President's Foreign Intelligence Advisory Board (PFIAB) in 1989, confirmed that there was a belief that the US sought to have military superiority over the USSR. The PFIAB did not confirm that individuals believed the exercise brought war with the USSR closer to reality however. The board concluded that the event had increased tensions between the two nations and that it was probable the USSR may have interpreted Able Archer as an attack.

The true conditions at the time of the Able Archer exercise of 1983 may never be known, as many of the records from the Soviet side of this period remain inaccessible.

In 2025, the State Department deleted webpages that documented the exercise.

== In popular culture ==
Able Archer 83 and the tensions it engendered form the basis of conflict in the second act of the 2025 revival of the musical Chess, with a heavily revised book. Previous versions of the musical did not refer to Able Archer. In the musical, CIA and KGB case officers argue about the true intent of the exercise in the context of the world chess championship set in Bangkok. A Fourth wall-breaking narrator ("The Arbiter") explains to the audience that Able Archer 83 was a real event that actually caused serious tensions, and that the full and true story still (as of 2025) is not known publicly.

== See also ==
- Deutschland 83, a 2015 German-American television series, in which Able Archer 83 is a plot point
- Doomsday Clock, a symbol representing the likelihood of man-made global catastrophe
- Operation Giant Lance, a secret U.S. nuclear alert in late October 1969 by President Nixon
- Rainer Rupp, an East German spy, working in NATO headquarters, 1977–1989
