= Spycraft (TV series) =

American docuseries created for Netflix

- Genre: Docuseries
- Directed by: Maria Berry; Jan Spindler; Marek Bures
- Country of origin: United States
- Original language: English
- No. of seasons: 1
- No. of episodes: 8

Production
- Cinematography: Alexander Sworik
- Editors: Jan Spindler; Matej Sram
- Running time: 29-38 minutes
- Production company: Big Media

Original release
- Network: Netflix
- Release: January 20, 2021

Spycraft is a 2021 American docuseries created for Netflix. Each episode details a different method used by countries in the craft of espionage from World War I era to present day, which is shown through expert interviews and archival footage. The series was released on January 20, 2021.

== Episodes ==
Episode name	Episode number	Runtime
High-Tech Surveillance and an Eye in the Sky	S1E1	29 min.
Deadly Poisons	S1E2	31 min.
Sexspionage	S1E3	33 min.
Clandestine Collection	S1E4	36 min.
Covert Communication	S1E5	33 min.
Special Ops and the Saboteur	S1E6	30 min.
The Code Breakers	S1E7	36 min.
Recruiting the Perfect Spy	S1E8	38 min.
